= William Hogarth =

English artist and writer (1697–1764)

William Hogarth FRSA
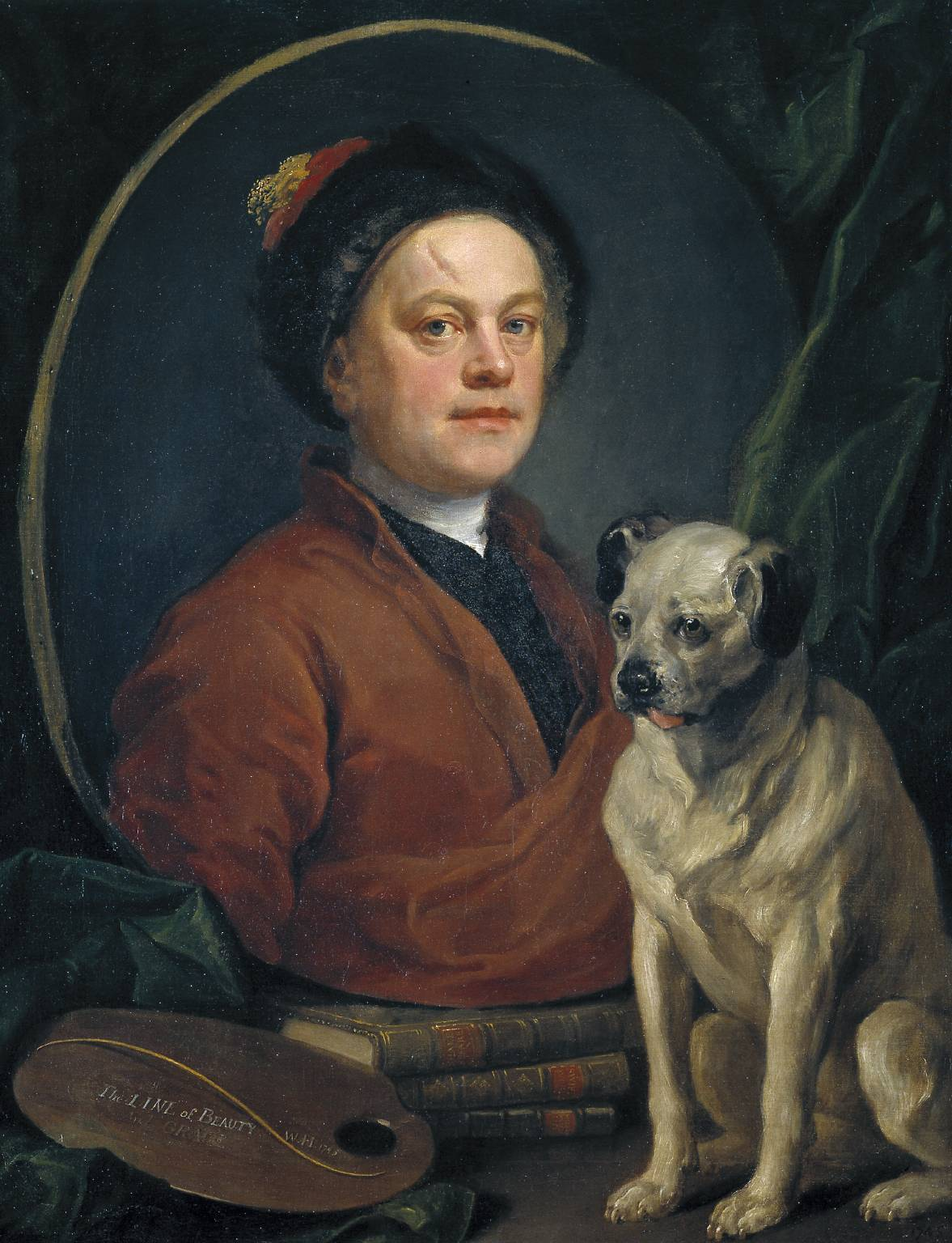
- The Painter and his Pug, 1745 self-portrait of Hogarth with his pug Trump
- Born: 10 November 1697; London, England
- Died: 26 October 1764 (aged 66); London, England
- Resting place: St Nicholas Church, Chiswick
- Notable work: A Harlot's Progress; A Rake's Progress
- Spouse: Jane Thornhill (m. 1729)
- Patrons: Mary Edwards (1705–1743)

William Hogarth (/ˈhoʊɡɑːrθ/; 10 November 1697 – 26 October 1764) was an English painter, engraver, cartoonist, and satirist. His work ranges from realistic portraiture to comic strip-like series of pictures called "modern moral subjects", and he is perhaps best known for his series A Harlot's Progress, A Rake's Progress and Marriage A-la-Mode. Familiarity with his work is so widespread that satirical political illustrations in this style are often referred to as "Hogarthian".

Hogarth was born in the City of London into a lower-middle-class family. In his youth he took up an apprenticeship with an engraver, but did not complete the apprenticeship. His father underwent periods of mixed fortune, and was at one time imprisoned in lieu of payment of outstanding debts, an event that is thought to have informed William's paintings and prints with a hard edge.

Influenced by French and Italian painting and engraving, Hogarth's works are mostly satirical caricatures, sometimes bawdily sexual, mostly of the first rank of realistic portraiture. They became widely popular and mass-produced via prints in his lifetime, and he was by far the most significant English artist of his generation. Charles Lamb deemed Hogarth's images to be books, filled with "the teeming, fruitful, suggestive meaning of words. Other pictures we look at; his pictures we read."

== Early life ==
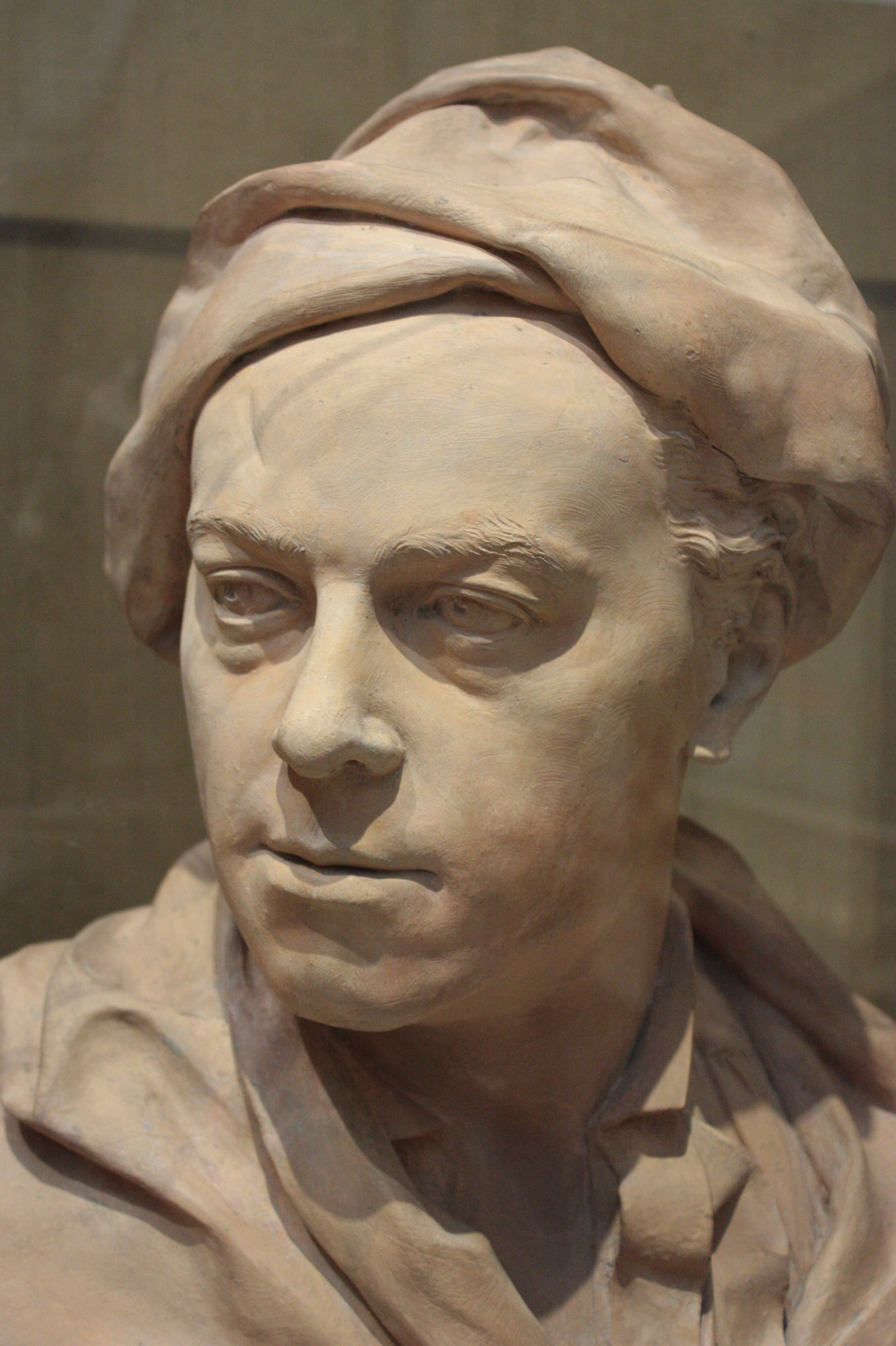
William Hogarth by Louis-François Roubiliac, 1741, National Portrait Gallery, London

William Hogarth was born at Bartholomew Close in London to Richard Hogarth, a poor Latin school teacher and textbook writer, and Anne Gibbons. In his youth he was apprenticed to the engraver Ellis Gamble in Leicester Fields, where he learned to engrave trade cards and similar products.

Young Hogarth also took a lively interest in the street life of the metropolis and the London fairs, and amused himself by sketching the characters he saw. Around the same time, his father, who had opened an unsuccessful Latin-speaking coffee house at St John's Gate, was imprisoned for debt in the Fleet Prison for five years. Hogarth never spoke of his father's imprisonment.

In 1720, Hogarth enrolled at the original St Martin's Lane Academy in Peter Court, London, which was run by Louis Chéron and John Vanderbank. He attended alongside other future leading figures in art and design, such as Joseph Highmore, William Kent, and Arthur Pond. The academy seems to have stopped operating in 1724, at around the same time that Vanderbank fled to France in order to avoid creditors. Hogarth recalled of the first incarnation of the academy: "this lasted a few years but the treasurer sinking the subscription money the lamp stove etc were seized for rent and the whole affair put a stop to."

Hogarth then enrolled in another drawing school, in Covent Garden, shortly after it opened in November 1724, which was run by Sir James Thornhill, serjeant painter to George I. On Thornhill, Hogarth later claimed that, even as an apprentice, "the painting of St Pauls and gree[n]wich hospital ... were during this time run ing in my head", referring to the massive schemes of decoration painted by Thornhill for the dome of St Paul's Cathedral, and the Painted Hall at Greenwich Hospital.

Hogarth became a member of the Rose and Crown Club, with Peter Tillemans, George Vertue, Michael Dahl, and other artists and connoisseurs.

== Career ==
By April 1720, Hogarth was an engraver in his own right, at first engraving coats of arms and shop bills and designing plates for booksellers.

In 1727, he was hired by Joshua Morris, a tapestry worker, to prepare a design for the Element of Earth. Morris heard that he was "an engraver, and no painter", and consequently declined the work when completed. Hogarth accordingly sued him for the money in the Westminster Court, where the case was decided in his favour on 28 May 1728.

=== Early works ===
Early satirical works included an Emblematical Print on the South Sea Scheme (c. 1721, published 1724), about the disastrous stock market crash of 1720, known as the South Sea Bubble, in which many English people lost a great deal of money. In the bottom left corner, he shows Protestant, Roman Catholic, and Jewish figures gambling, while in the middle there is a huge machine, like a merry-go-round, which people are boarding. At the top is a goat, written below which is "Who'l Ride". The people are scattered around the picture with a sense of disorder, while the progress of the well dressed people towards the ride in the middle shows the foolishness of the crowd in buying stock in the South Sea Company, which spent more time issuing stock than anything else.

Other early works include The Lottery (1724); The Mystery of Masonry brought to Light by the Gormagons (1724); A Just View of the British Stage (1724); some book illustrations; and the small print Masquerades and Operas (1724). The latter is a satire on contemporary follies, such as the masquerades of the Swiss impresario John James Heidegger, the popular Italian opera singers, John Rich's pantomimes at Lincoln's Inn Fields, and the exaggerated popularity of Lord Burlington's protégé, the architect and painter William Kent. He continued that theme in 1727, with the Large Masquerade Ticket.

In 1726, Hogarth prepared twelve large engravings illustrating Samuel Butler's Hudibras. These he himself valued highly, and they are among his best early works, though they are based on small book illustrations.

In the following years, he turned his attention to the production of small "conversation pieces" (i.e., groups in oil of full-length portraits from 12 to 15 inches (300 to 380 mm) high). Among his efforts in oil between 1728 and 1732 were The Fountaine Family (c. 1730), The Assembly at Wanstead House, The House of Commons examining Bambridge, and several pictures of the chief actors in John Gay's popular The Beggar's Opera. One of his real-life subjects was Sarah Malcolm, whom he sketched two days before her execution.

One of Hogarth's masterpieces of this period is the depiction of an amateur performance by children of John Dryden's The Indian Emperour or The Conquest of Mexico by Spaniards, being the Sequel of The Indian Queen (1732–1735) at the home of John Conduitt, master of the mint, in St George's Street, Hanover Square.

Hogarth's other works in the 1730s include A Midnight Modern Conversation (1733), Southwark Fair (1733), The Sleeping Congregation (1736), Before and After (1736), Scholars at a Lecture (1736), The Company of Undertakers (1736), The Distrest Poet (1736), The Four Times of the Day (1738), and Strolling Actresses Dressing in a Barn (1738). He may also have printed Burlington Gate (1731), evoked by Alexander Pope's "Epistle to Lord Burlington", and defending James Brydges, 1st Duke of Chandos, who is therein satirized. This print gave great offence, and was suppressed. However, modern authorities such as Ronald Paulson no longer attribute it to Hogarth.

Early works

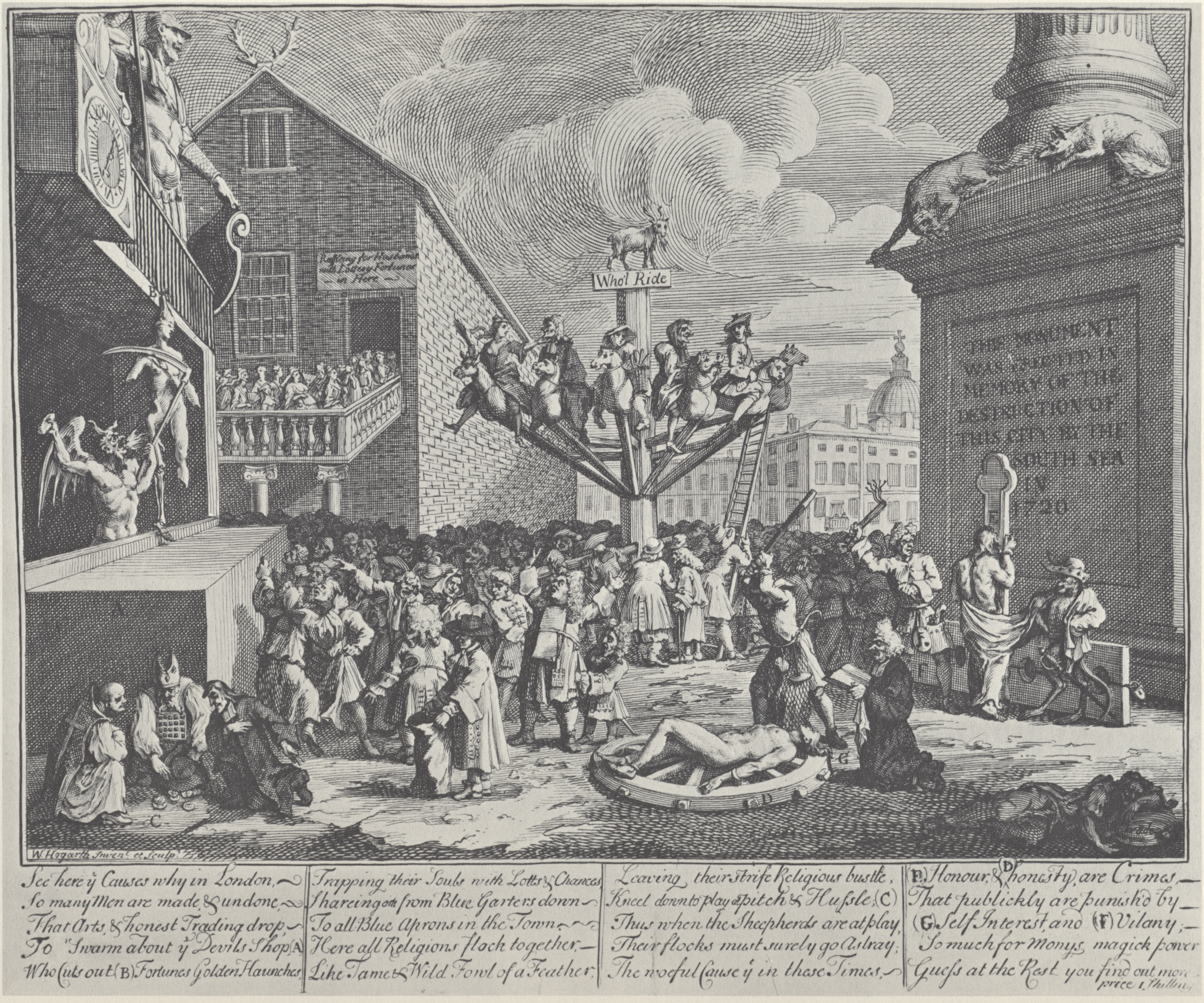
Emblematical Print on the South Sea Scheme, 1721

The Assembly at Wanstead House. Richard Child, 1st Earl Tylney and family in foreground

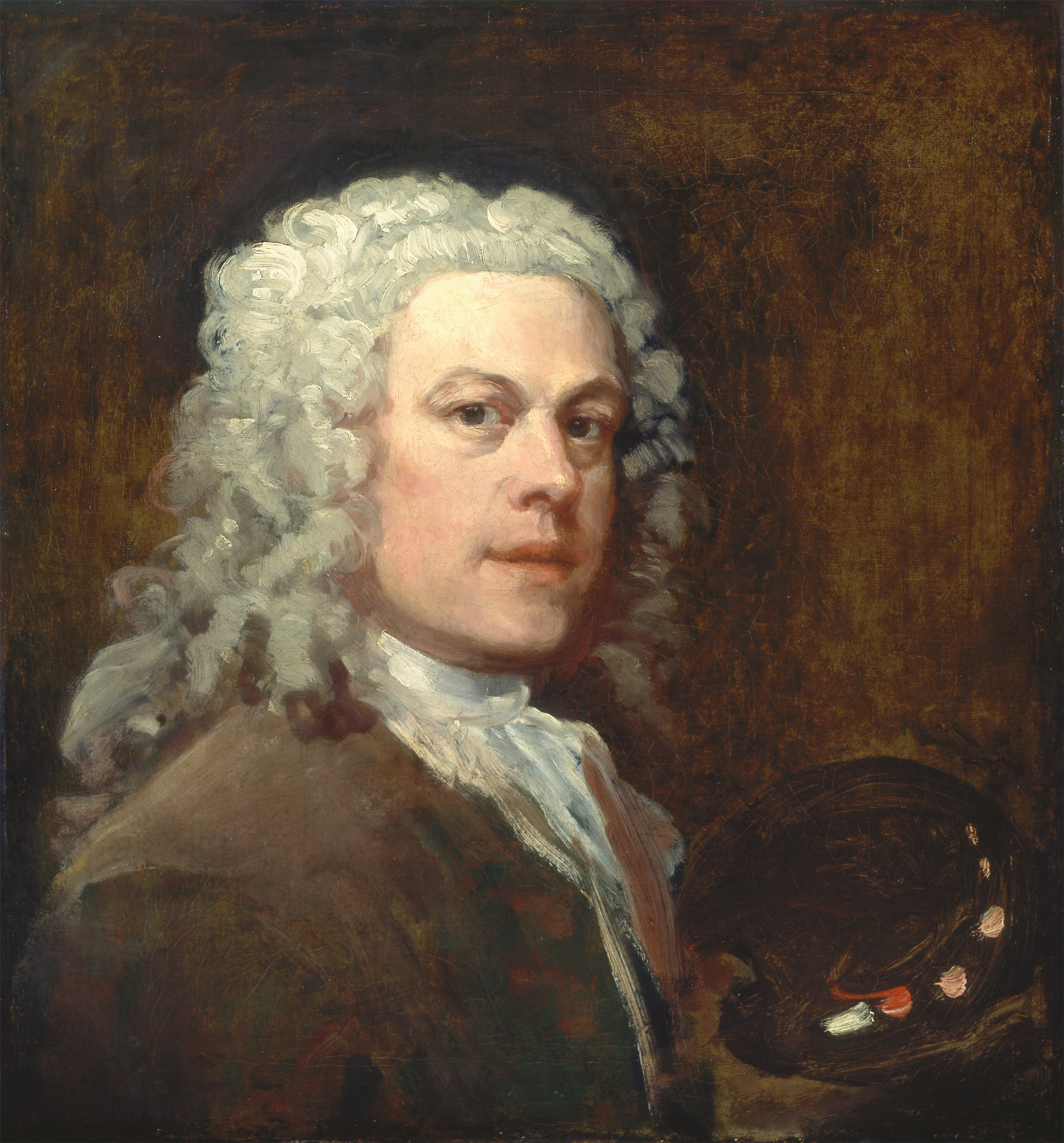
Self-Portrait, ca. 1735

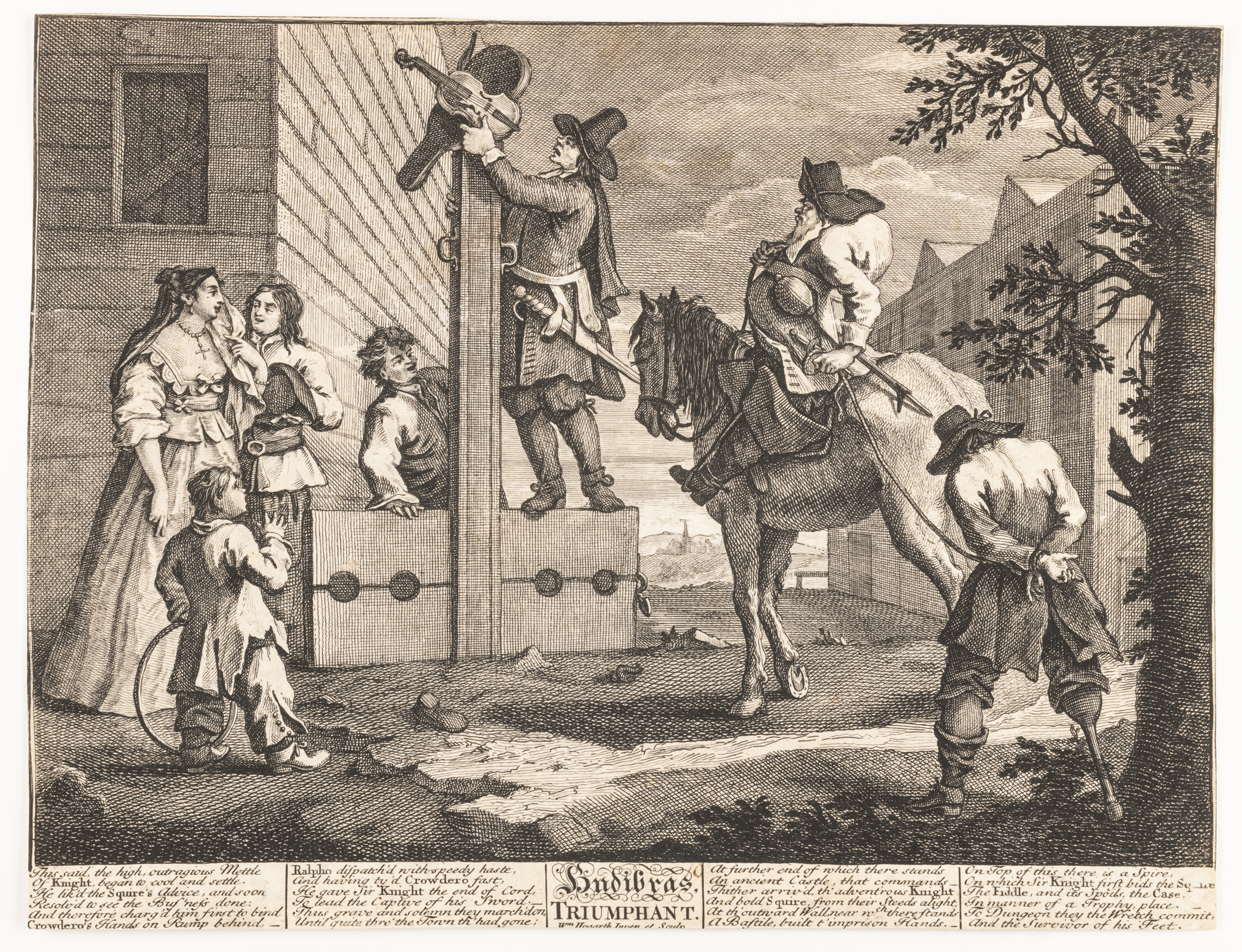
Hudibras Triumphant, one of the twelve engravings illustrating the adventures of Hudibras, a bumbling adventurer from Samuel Butler's mock-heroic poem

=== Moralizing art ===
==== Harlot's Progress and Rake's Progress ====
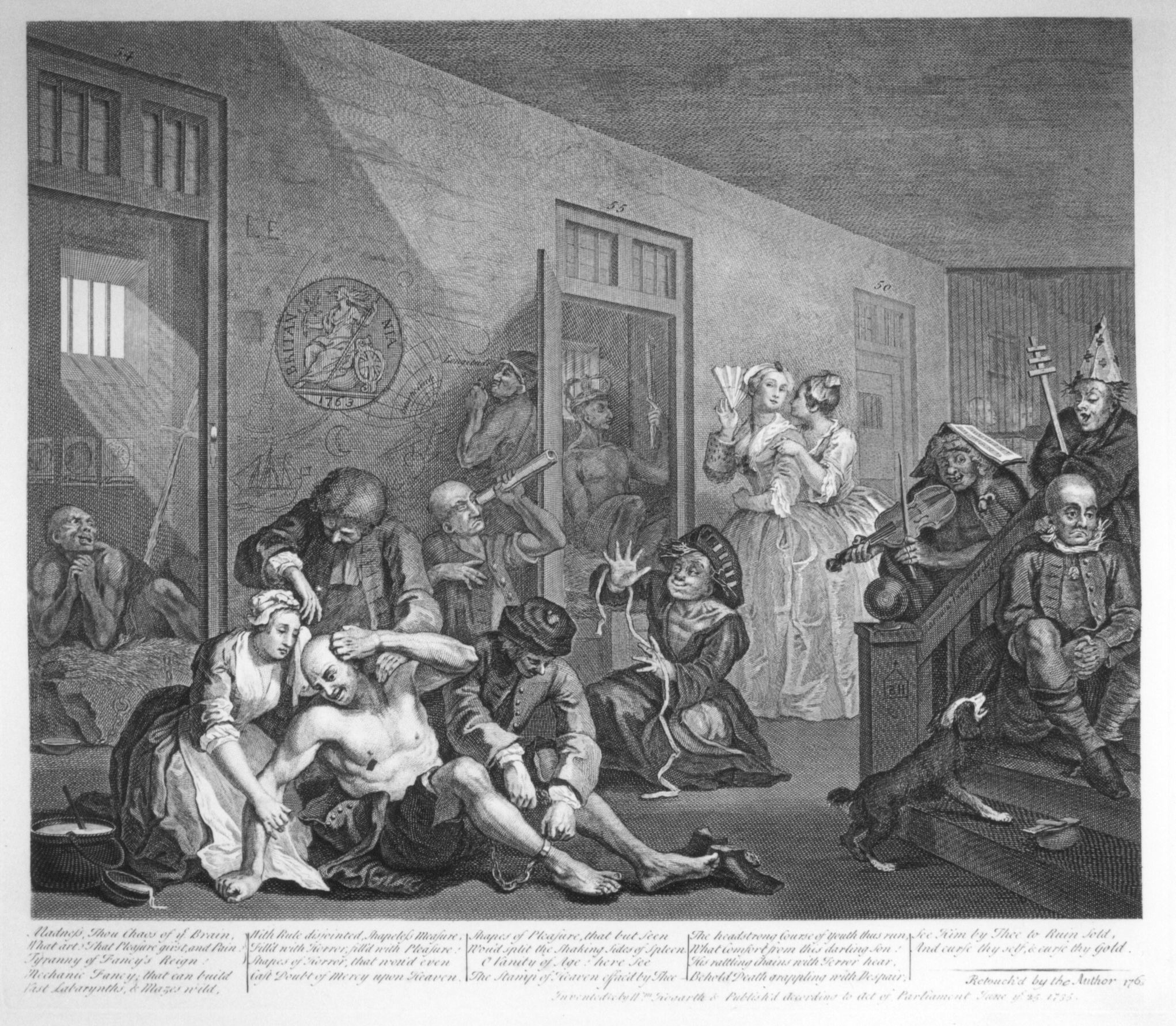
A Rake's Progress, Plate 8, 1735, and retouched by Hogarth in 1763 by adding the Britannia emblem

In 1731, Hogarth completed the earliest of his series of moral works, a body of work that led to wide recognition. The collection of six scenes was entitled A Harlot's Progress and appeared first as paintings (now lost) before being published as engravings. A Harlot's Progress depicts the fate of a country girl who begins prostituting – the six scenes are chronological, starting with a meeting with a bawd and ending with a funeral ceremony that follows the character's death from venereal disease.

The inaugural series was an immediate success and was followed in 1733–1735 by the sequel A Rake's Progress. The second instalment consisted of eight pictures that depicted the reckless life of Tom Rakewell, the son of a rich merchant, who spends all of his money on luxurious living, services from prostitutes, and gambling – the character's life ultimately ends in Bethlem Royal Hospital. The original paintings of A Harlot's Progress were destroyed in the fire at Fonthill House in 1755; the oil paintings of A Rake's Progress (1733–34) are displayed in the gallery room at Sir John Soane's Museum, London, UK.

When the success of A Harlot's Progress and A Rake's Progress resulted in numerous pirated reproductions by unscrupulous printsellers, Hogarth lobbied in parliament for greater legal control over the reproduction of his and other artists' work. The result was the Engravers' Copyright Act (known as 'Hogarth's Act'), which became law on 25 June 1735 and was the first copyright law to deal with visual works as well as the first to recognise the authorial rights of an individual artist.

==== Marriage A-la-Mode ====
Marriage à-la-mode, After the old Earl's funeral (scene four of six)

In 1743–1745, Hogarth painted the six pictures of Marriage A-la-Mode (National Gallery, London), a pointed skewering of upper-class 18th-century society. An engraved version of the same series, produced by French engravers, appeared in 1745. This moralistic warning shows the miserable tragedy of an ill-considered marriage for money. This is regarded by many as his finest project.

Marital ethics were the topic of much debate in 18th-century Britain. The many marriages of convenience and their attendant unhappiness came in for particular criticism, with a variety of authors taking the view that love was a much sounder basis for marriage. Hogarth here painted a satire – a genre that by definition has a moral point to convey – of a conventional marriage within the English upper class. All the paintings were engraved and the series achieved wide circulation in print form.

The series, which is set in a Classical interior, shows the story of the fashionable marriage of Viscount Squanderfield, the son of bankrupt Earl Squander, to the daughter of a wealthy but miserly city merchant, starting with the signing of a marriage contract at the Earl's grand house and ending with the murder of the son by his wife's lover and the suicide of the daughter after her lover is hanged at Tyburn for murdering her husband.

The novelist William Makepeace Thackeray wrote:

This famous set of pictures contains the most important and highly wrought of the Hogarth comedies. The care and method with which the moral grounds of these pictures are laid is as remarkable as the wit and skill of the observing and dexterous artist. He has to describe the negotiations for a marriage pending between the daughter of a rich citizen Alderman and young Lord Viscount Squanderfield, the dissipated son of a gouty old Earl ... The dismal end is known. My lord draws upon the counsellor, who kills him, and is apprehended while endeavouring to escape. My lady goes back perforce to the Alderman of the City, and faints upon reading Counsellor Silvertongue's dying speech at Tyburn (place of execution in old London), where the counsellor has been 'executed for sending his lordship out of the world. Moral: don't listen to evil silver-tongued counsellors; don't marry a man for his rank, or a woman for her money; don't frequent foolish auctions and masquerade balls unknown to your husband; don't have wicked companions abroad and neglect your wife, otherwise you will be run through the body, and ruin will ensue, and disgrace, and Tyburn.

==== Industry and Idleness ====
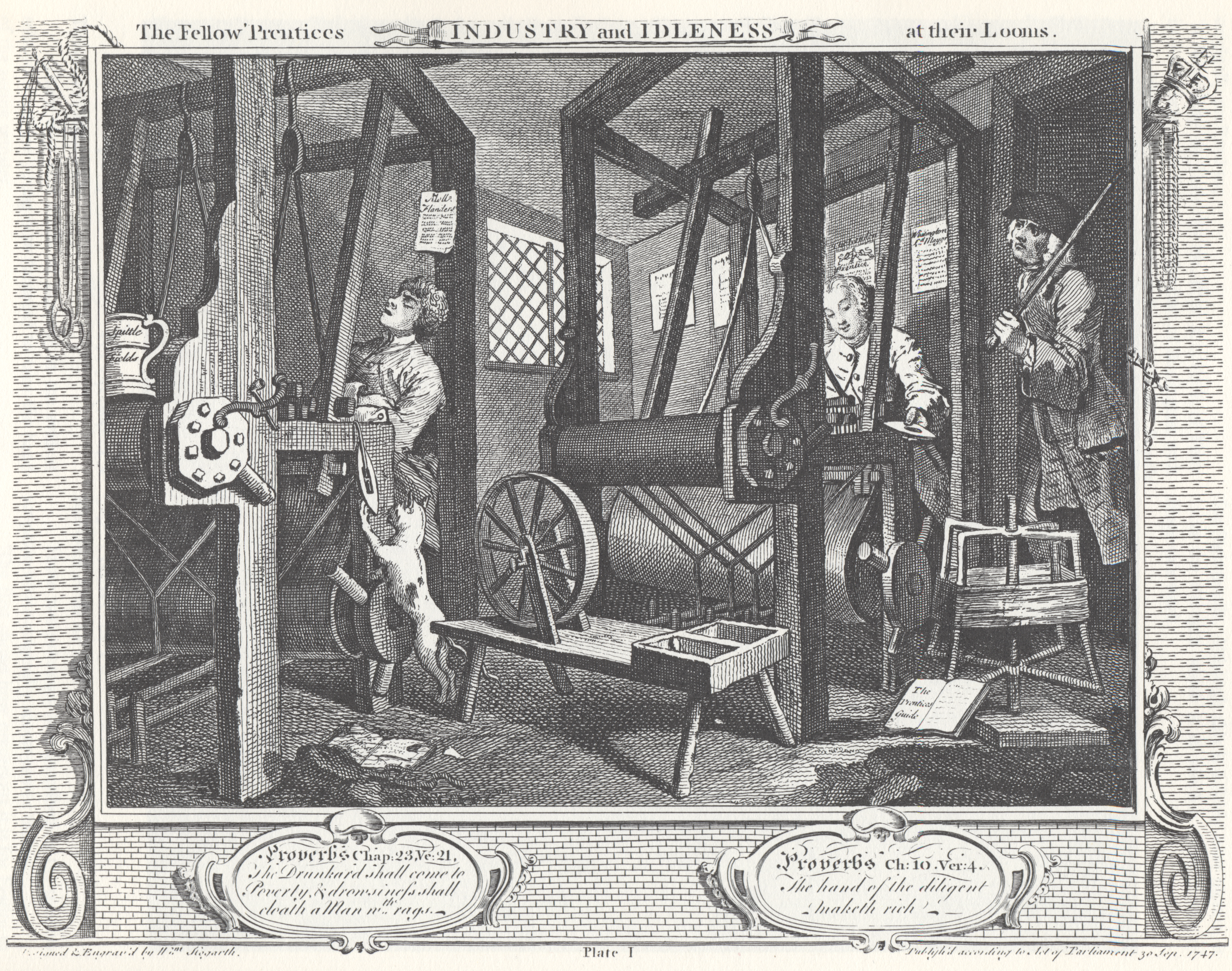
Industry and Idleness Plate 1, The Fellow 'Prentices at their Looms

In the twelve prints of Industry and Idleness (1747), Hogarth shows the progression in the lives of two apprentices, one of whom is dedicated and hard working, while the other, who is idle, commits crime and is eventually executed. This shows the work ethic of Protestant England, where those who worked hard were rewarded, such as the industrious apprentice who becomes Sheriff (plate 8), Alderman (plate 10), and finally the Lord Mayor of London in the last plate in the series.

The idle apprentice, who begins "at play in the church yard" (plate 3), holes up "in a Garrett with a Common Prostitute" after turning highwayman (plate 7) and "executed at Tyburn" (plate 11). The idle apprentice is sent to the gallows by the industrious apprentice himself. For each plate, there is at least one passage from the Bible at the bottom, mostly from the Book of Proverbs, such as for the first plate:

"Industry and Idleness, shown here, 'Proverbs Ch:10 Ver:4 The hand of the diligent maketh rich.'"

==== Beer Street and Gin Lane ====
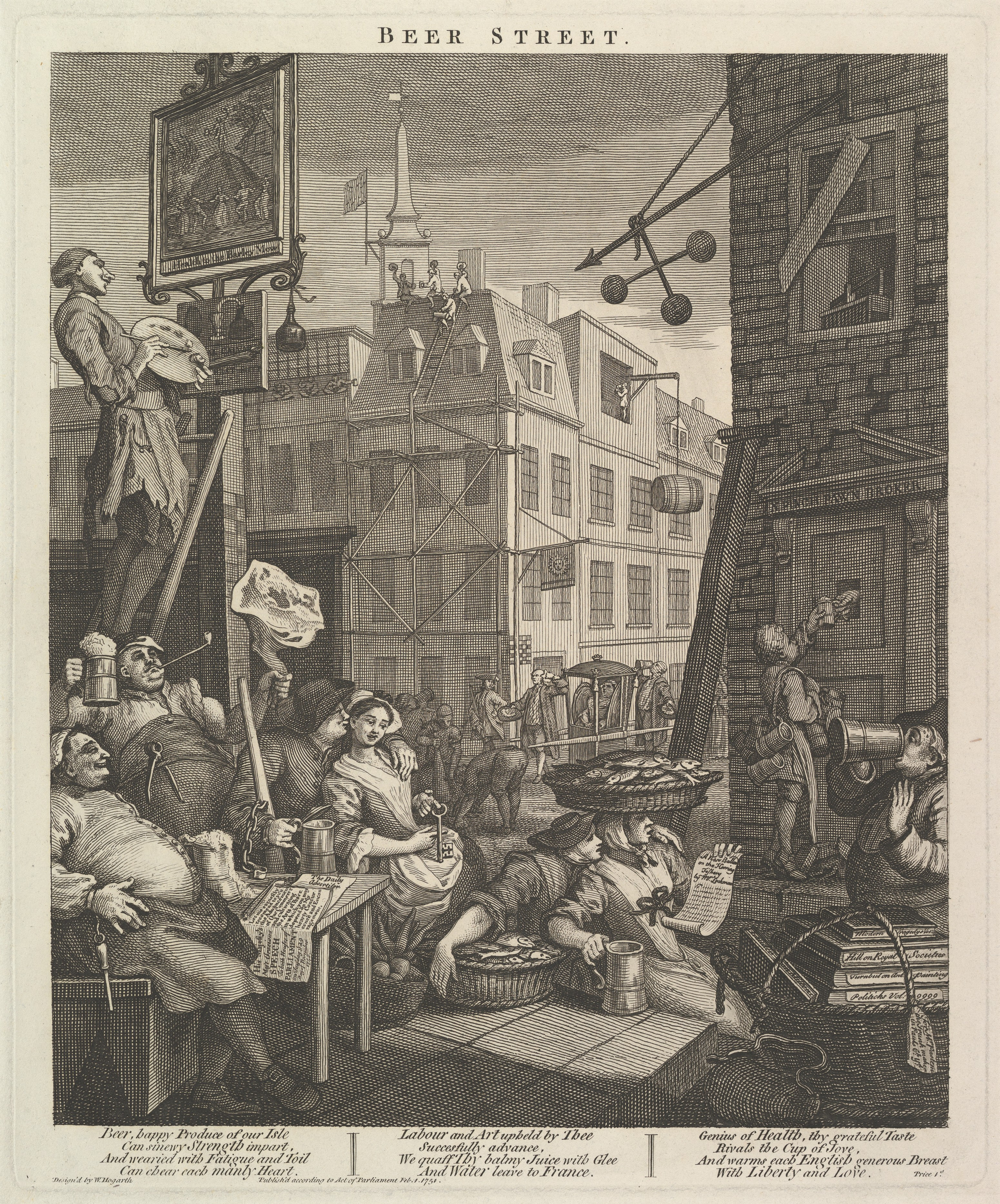
Beer Street

Later prints of significance include his pictorial warning of the consequences of alcoholism in Beer Street and Gin Lane (1751). Hogarth engraved Beer Street to show a happy city drinking the 'good' beverage, English beer, in contrast to Gin Lane, in which the effects of drinking gin are shown – as a more potent liquor, gin caused more problems for society.

There had been a sharp increase in the popularity of gin at this time, which was called the 'Gin Craze.' It started in the early 18th century, after a series of legislative actions in the late 17th century impacted the importation and manufacturing of alcohol in London. Among these, were the Prohibition of 1678, which barred popular French brandy imports, and the forced disbandment, in 1690, of the London Guild of Distillers, whose members had previously been the only legal manufacturers of alcohol, leading to an increase in the production and then consumption of domestic gin.

In Beer Street, people are shown as healthy, happy and prosperous, while in Gin Lane, they are scrawny, lazy and careless. The woman at the front of Gin Lane, who lets her baby fall to its death, echoes the tale of Judith Dufour, who strangled her baby so she could sell its clothes for gin money. The prints were published in support of the Gin Act 1751.

Hogarth's friend, the magistrate Henry Fielding, may have enlisted Hogarth to help with propaganda for the Gin Act; Beer Street and Gin Lane were issued shortly after his work An Enquiry into the Causes of the Late Increase of Robbers, and Related Writings, and addressed the same issues.

==== The Four Stages of Cruelty ====
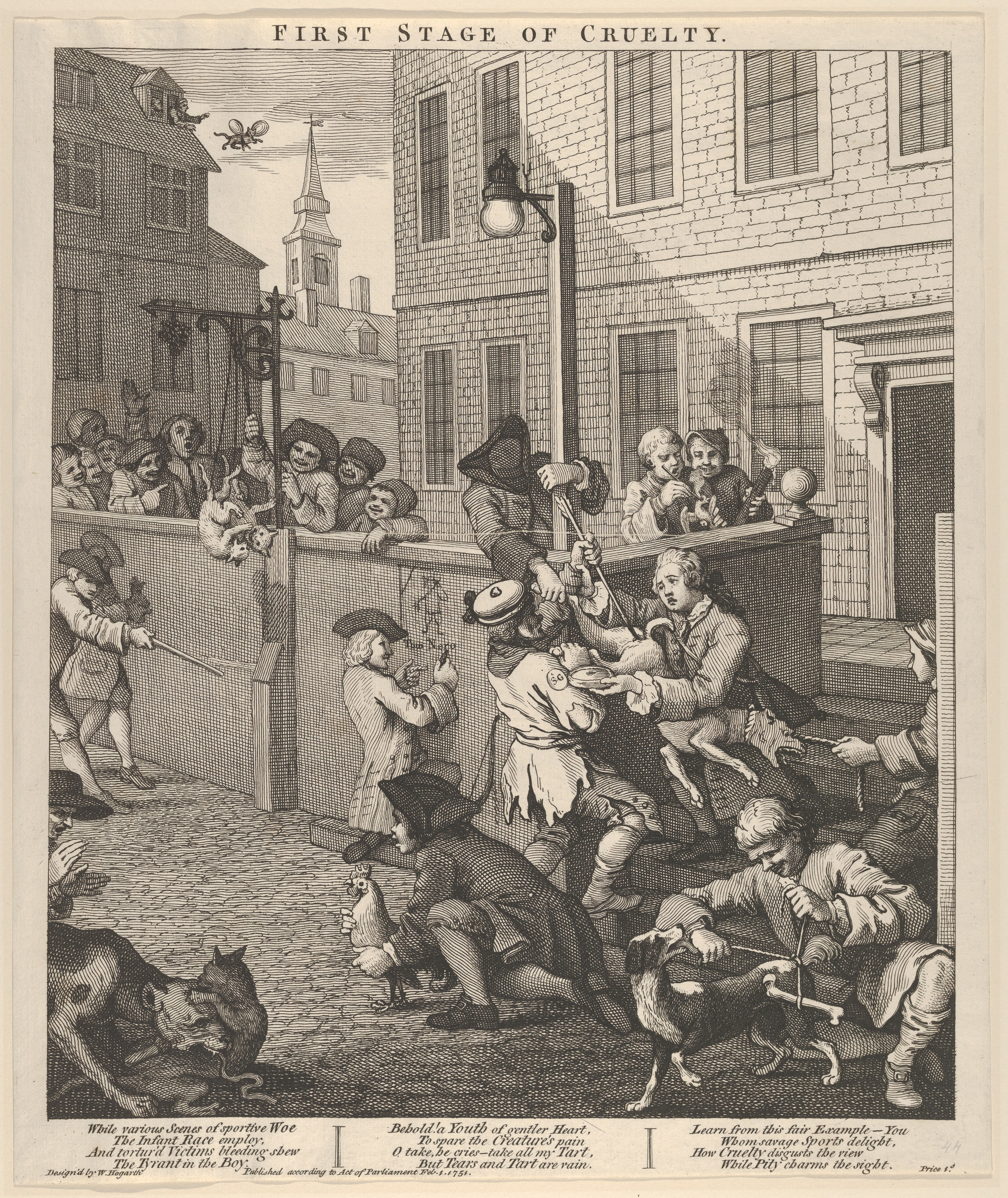
First Stage of Cruelty

Other prints were his outcry against inhumanity in The Four Stages of Cruelty (published 21 February 1751), in which Hogarth depicts the cruel treatment of animals which he saw around him and suggests what will happen to people who carry on in this manner. In the first print, there are scenes of boys torturing dogs, cats and other animals. It centers around a poorly dressed boy committing a violent act of torture upon a dog, while being pleaded with to stop, and offered food, by another well-dressed boy. A boy behind them has graffitied a hanged stickman figure upon a wall, with the name "Tom Nero" underneath, and is pointing to this dog torturer.

The second shows Tom Nero has grown up to become a Hackney coach driver. His coach has overturned with a heavy load and his horse is lying on the ground, having broken its leg. He is beating it with the handle of his whip; its eye severely wounded. Other people around him are seen abusing their work animals and livestock, and a child is being run over by the wheel of a brewer's dray, as the drayman dozes off on the job.

In the third print, Tom is shown to be a murderer, surrounded by a mob of accusers. The woman he has apparently killed is lying on the ground, brutally slain, with a trunk and sack of stolen goods near by. One of the accusers holds a letter from the woman to Tom, speaking of how wronging her mistress upsets her conscience, but that she is resolved to do as he would have her, closing with: "I remain yours till death."

The fourth, titled The Reward of Cruelty, shows Tom's withering corpse being publicly dissected by scientists after his execution by hanging; a noose still around his neck. The dissection reflects the Murder Act 1751, which allowed for the public dissection of criminals who had been hanged for murder.

=== Portraits ===
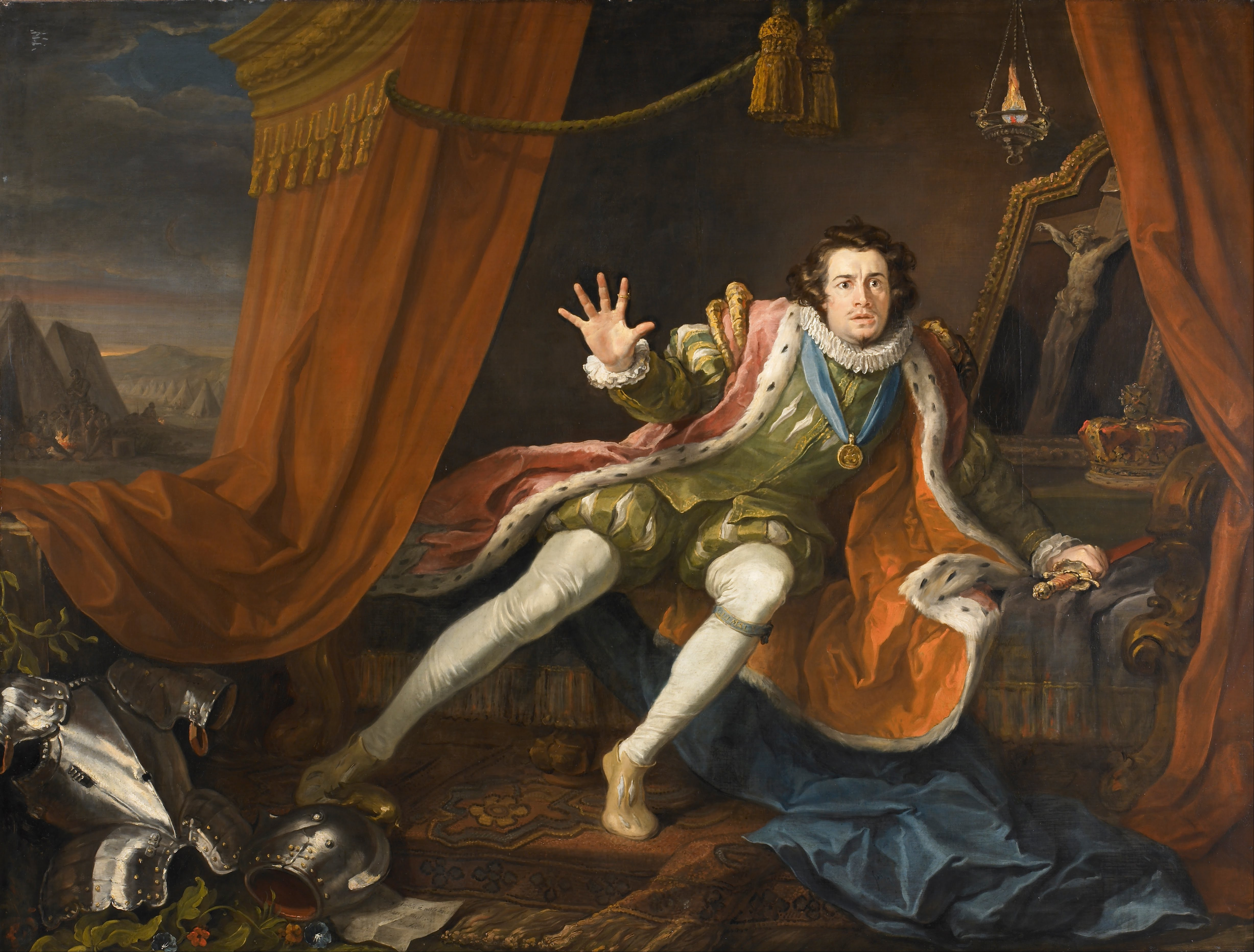
David Garrick as Richard III (1745)

Hogarth was a popular portrait painter. In 1745, he painted actor David Garrick as Richard III, for which he was paid £200, "which was more", he wrote, "than any English artist ever received for a single portrait." With this picture Hogarth established the genre of theatrical portraiture as a distinctively British kind of history painting. In 1746, a sketch of Simon Fraser, 11th Lord Lovat, afterwards beheaded on Tower Hill, had an exceptional success when turned into an etching.

In 1740, he created a truthful, vivid full-length portrait of his friend, the philanthropic Captain Coram, for the Thomas Coram Foundation for Children, now in the Foundling Museum. This portrait, and his unfinished oil sketch of a young fishwoman, entitled The Shrimp Girl (National Gallery, London), may be called masterpieces of British painting. There are also portraits of his wife, his two sisters, and of many other people; among them Bishop Benjamin Hoadly and Bishop Thomas Herring. The engraved portrait of John Wilkes was a bestseller.

=== Historical subjects ===
For a long period, during the mid-18th century, Hogarth tried to achieve the status of a history painter, but did not earn much respect in that field. The painter, and later founder of the Royal Academy of Arts, Joshua Reynolds, was highly critical of Hogarth's style and work. According to the art historian David Bindman, in Dr Johnson's serial of essays for London's Universal Chronicle, The Idler, the three essays written by Reynolds for the months of September to November 1759 are directed at Hogarth.

Whereas the Idler essay no. 76, which attacks a connoisseur's "servile attention to minute exactness", seems to be more likely a response to the Hogarth supporter, Benjamin Ralph and his book, The School of Raphael (published in May 1759), in the Idler essay no. 79, Reynolds questions Hogarth's notion of the imitation of nature as "the obvious sense, that objects are represented naturally when they have such relief that they seem real." Reynolds rejected "this kind of imitation", favouring the "grand style of painting" which avoids "minute attention" to the visible world. In Reynolds' Discourse XIV, he grants Hogarth has "extraordinary talents", but reproaches him for "very imprudently, or rather presumptuously, attempt[ing] the great historical style."

Writer, art historian and politician, Horace Walpole, was also critical of Hogarth as a history painter, but did find value in his satirical prints.

==== Biblical scenes ====
Hogarth's history pictures include The Pool of Bethesda and The Good Samaritan, executed in 1736–1737 for St Bartholomew's Hospital; Moses brought before Pharaoh's Daughter, painted for the Foundling Hospital (1747, formerly at the Thomas Coram Foundation for Children, now in the Foundling Museum); Paul before Felix (1748) at Lincoln's Inn; and his altarpiece for St. Mary Redcliffe, Bristol (1755–56).

==== The Gate of Calais ====
The Gate of Calais (1748; now in Tate Britain) was produced soon after his return from a visit to France. Horace Walpole wrote that Hogarth had run a great risk to go there since the peace of Aix-la-Chapelle.

Back home, he immediately executed a painting of the subject in which he unkindly represented his enemies, the Frenchmen, as cringing, emaciated and superstitious people, while an enormous sirloin of beef arrives, destined for the English inn as a symbol of British prosperity and superiority. He claimed to have painted himself into the picture in the left corner sketching the gate, with a "soldier's hand upon my shoulder", running him in.

=== Other later works ===
Notable Hogarth engravings in the 1740s include The Enraged Musician (1741), the six prints of Marriage à-la-mode (1745; executed by French artists under Hogarth's inspection), and The Stage Coach or The Country Inn Yard (1747).

In 1745, Hogarth painted a self-portrait with his pug dog, Trump (now also in Tate Britain), which shows him as a learned artist supported by volumes of Shakespeare, Milton and Swift. In 1749, he represented the somewhat disorderly English troops on their March of the Guards to Finchley (formerly located in Thomas Coram Foundation for Children, now Foundling Museum).

Others works included his ingenious Satire on False Perspective (1754); his satire on canvassing in his Election series (1755–1758; now in Sir John Soane's Museum); his ridicule of the English passion for cockfighting in The Cockpit (1759); his attack on Methodism in Credulity, Superstition, and Fanaticism (1762); his political anti-war satire in The Times, plate I (1762); and his pessimistic view of all things in Tailpiece, or The Bathos (1764).

In 1757, Hogarth was appointed Serjeant Painter to the King.

=== Writing ===
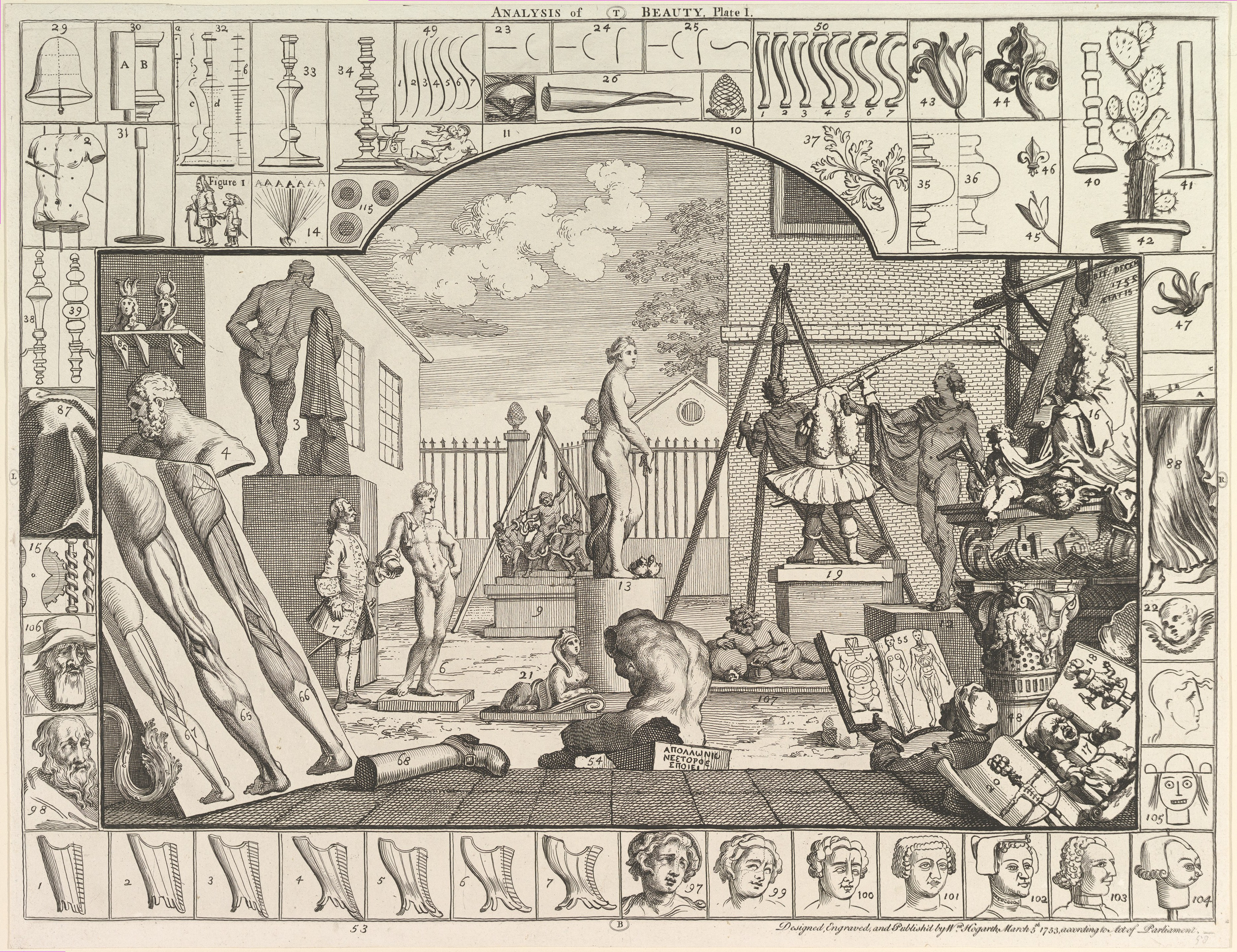
The Analysis of Beauty plate 1 (1753)

Hogarth wrote and published his ideas of artistic design in his book The Analysis of Beauty (1753). In it, he professes to define the principles of beauty and grace which he, a real child of Rococo, saw realized in serpentine lines (the Line of Beauty). By some of Hogarth's adherents, the book was praised as a fine deliverance upon aesthetics; by his enemies and rivals, its obscurities and minor errors were made the subject of endless ridicule and caricature. For instance, Paul Sandby produced several caricatures against Hogarth's treatise. Hogarth wrote also a manuscript called Apology for Painters (c. 1761) and unpublished "autobiographical notes".

=== Painter and engraver of modern moral subjects ===
Hogarth lived in an age when artwork became increasingly commercialized, being viewed in shop windows, taverns, and public buildings, and sold in printshops. Old hierarchies broke down, and new forms began to flourish: the ballad opera, the bourgeois tragedy, and especially, a new form of fiction called the novel with which authors such as Henry Fielding had great success. Therefore, by that time, Hogarth hit on a new idea: "painting and engraving modern moral subjects ... to treat my subjects as a dramatic writer; my picture was my stage", as he himself remarked in his manuscript notes.

He drew from the highly moralizing Protestant tradition of Dutch genre painting, and the very vigorous satirical traditions of the English broadsheet and other types of popular print. In England the fine arts had little comedy in them before Hogarth. His prints were expensive, and remained so until early 19th-century reprints brought them to a wider audience.

=== Parodic borrowings from Old Masters ===
When analysing the work of the artist as a whole, Ronald Paulson says, "In A Harlot's Progress, every single plate but one is based on Dürer's images of the story of the Virgin and the story of the Passion." In other works, he parodies Leonardo da Vinci's Last Supper. According to Paulson, Hogarth is subverting the religious establishment and the orthodox belief in an immanent God who intervenes in the lives of people and produces miracles.

Hogarth was a Deist, a believer in a God who created the universe but takes no direct hand in the lives of his creations. Thus, as a "comic history painter", he often poked fun at the old-fashioned, "beaten" subjects of religious art in his paintings and prints. Hogarth also rejected Lord Shaftesbury's then-current ideal of the classical Greek male in favour of the living, breathing female. He said, "Who but a bigot, even to the antiques, will say that he has not seen faces and necks, hands and arms in living women, that even the Grecian Venus doth but coarsely imitate."

== Personal life ==
On 23 March 1729, Hogarth eloped with Jane Thornhill at Paddington Church, against the wishes of her father, the artist Sir James Thornhill.

Sir James saw the match as unequal, as Hogarth was a rather obscure artist at the time. However, when Hogarth started on his series of moral prints, A Harlot's Progress, some of the initial paintings were placed either in Sir James' drawing room or dining room, through the conspiring of Jane and her mother, in the hopes of reconciling him with the couple. When he saw them, he inquired as to the artist's name and, upon hearing it, replied: "Very well; the man who can produce such representations as these, can also maintain a wife without a portion." However, he soon after relented, becoming more generous to, and living in harmony with the couple until his death.

Hogarth was initiated as a Freemason before 1728 in the Lodge at the Hand and Apple Tree Tavern, Little Queen Street, and later belonged to the Carrier Stone Lodge and the Grand Stewards' Lodge; the latter still possesses the 'Hogarth Jewel' which Hogarth designed for the Lodge's Master to wear. Today the original is in storage and a replica is worn by the Master of the Lodge. Freemasonry was a theme in some of Hogarth's work, most notably 'Night', the fourth in the quartet of paintings (later released as engravings) collectively entitled the Four Times of the Day.

His main home was in Leicester Square (then known as Leicester Fields), but he bought a country retreat in Chiswick in 1749, the house now known as Hogarth's House and preserved as a museum, and spent time there for the rest of his life. The Hogarths had no children, although they fostered foundling children. He was a founding Governor of the Foundling Hospital.

Among his friends and acquaintances were many English artists and satirists of the period, such as Francis Hayman, Henry Fielding, and Laurence Sterne.

Personal life

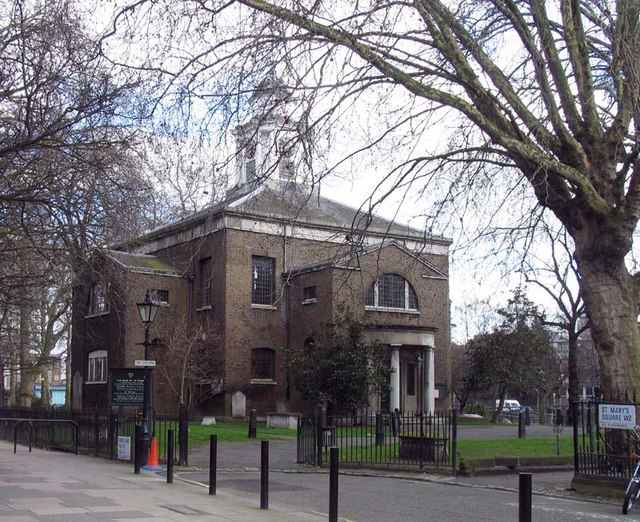
St Mary on Paddington Green: Hogarth and Jane Thornhill eloped to an earlier church on this site in 1729.

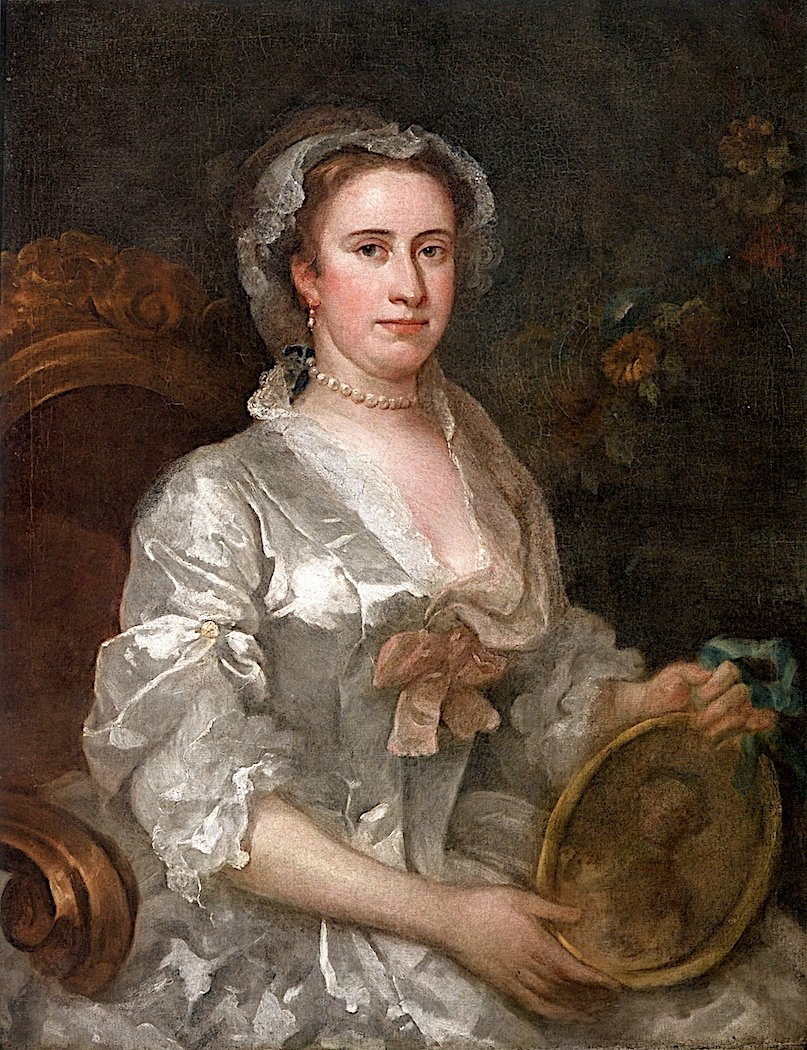
Hogarth's portrait of his wife, Jane Thornhill

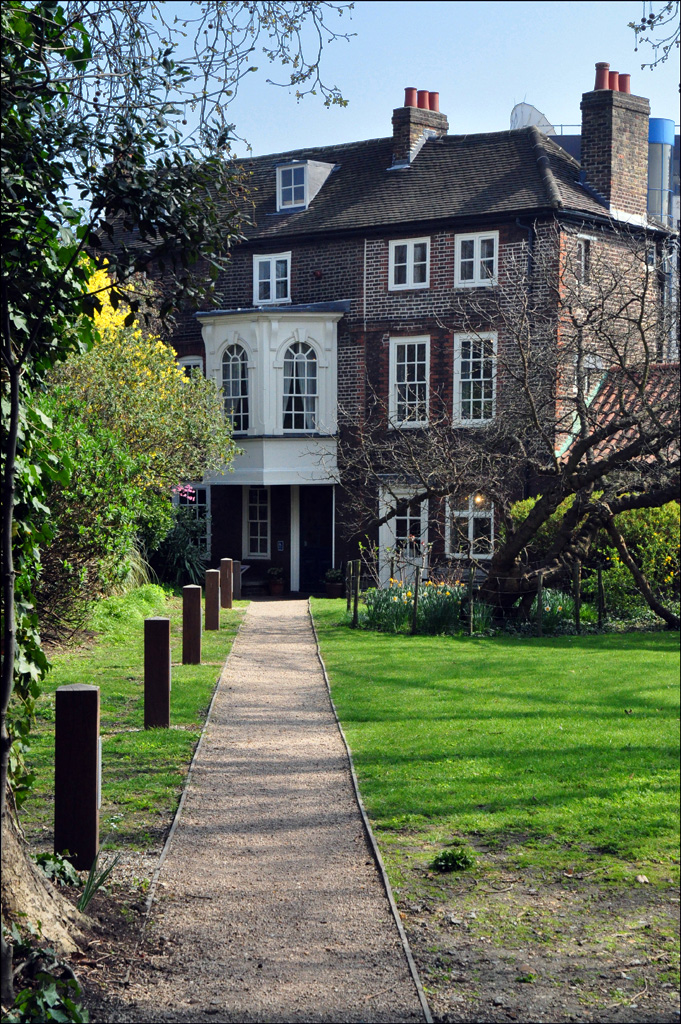
Hogarth's house in Chiswick

== Death ==
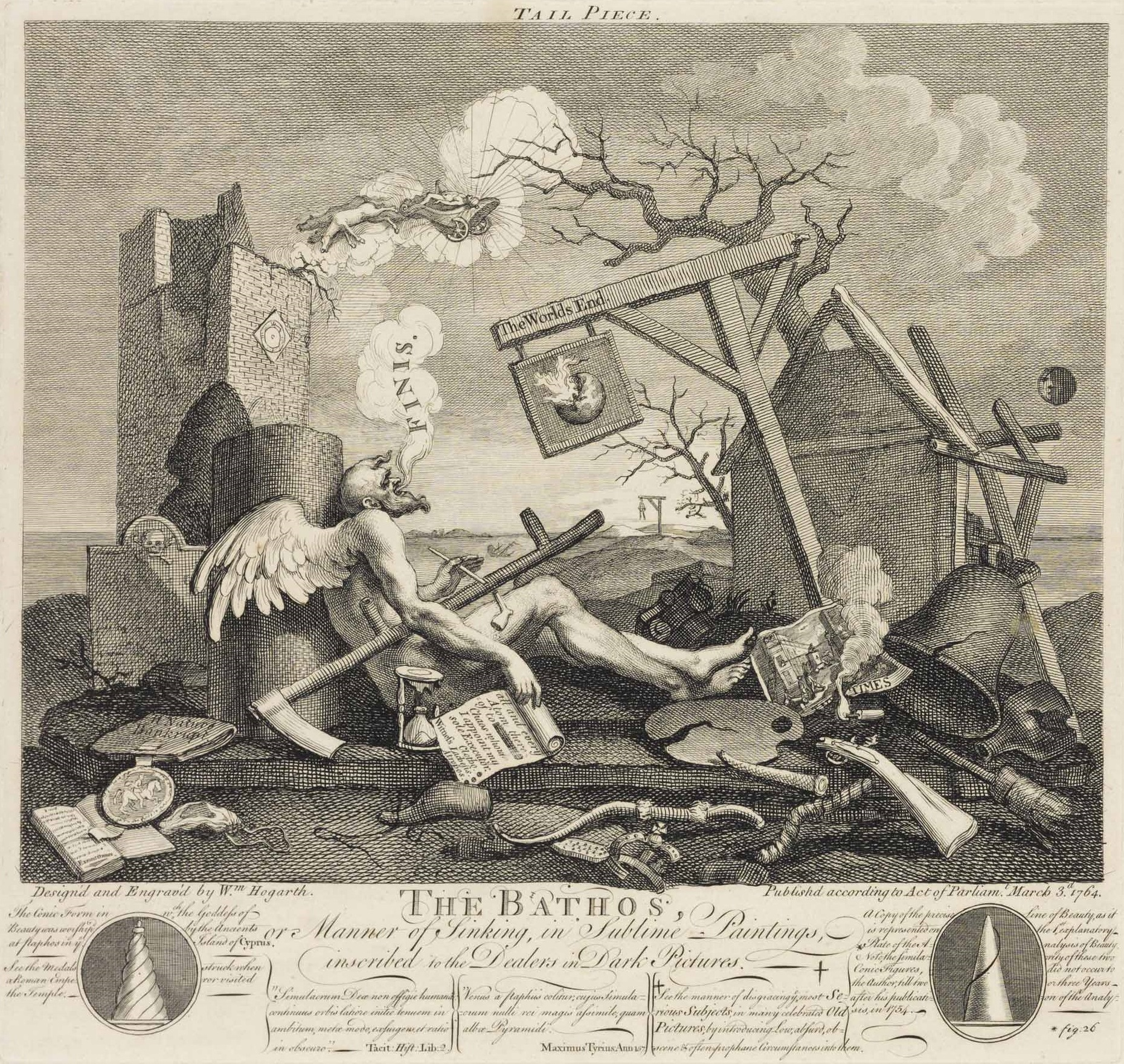
The Bathos, 1764—his final work

On 25 October 1764, Hogarth was conveyed from his villa in Chiswick to his home in Leicester Fields, in weak condition. He had been in a weakened state for a while by this time, but was said to be in a cheerful mood and was even still working—with some help; doing more retouches on The Bench on this same day. On 26 October, he received a letter from Benjamin Franklin and wrote up a rough draft in reply.

Before going to bed that evening, he had boasted about eating a pound of beefsteaks for dinner, and reportedly looked more robust than he had in a while at this time. However, when he went to bed, he suddenly began vomiting; something that caused him to ring his bell so forcefully that it broke. Hogarth died around two hours later, in the arms of his servant, Mrs Mary Lewis. John Nichols claimed that he died of an aneurysm, which he said took place in the "chest." Horace Walpole claimed that he died of "a dropsy of his breast."

Mrs Lewis, who stayed on with Jane Hogarth in Leicester Fields, was the only non-familial person acknowledged financially in Hogarth's will and was left £100 (approximately £15,236.79 in 2024) for her "faithful services."

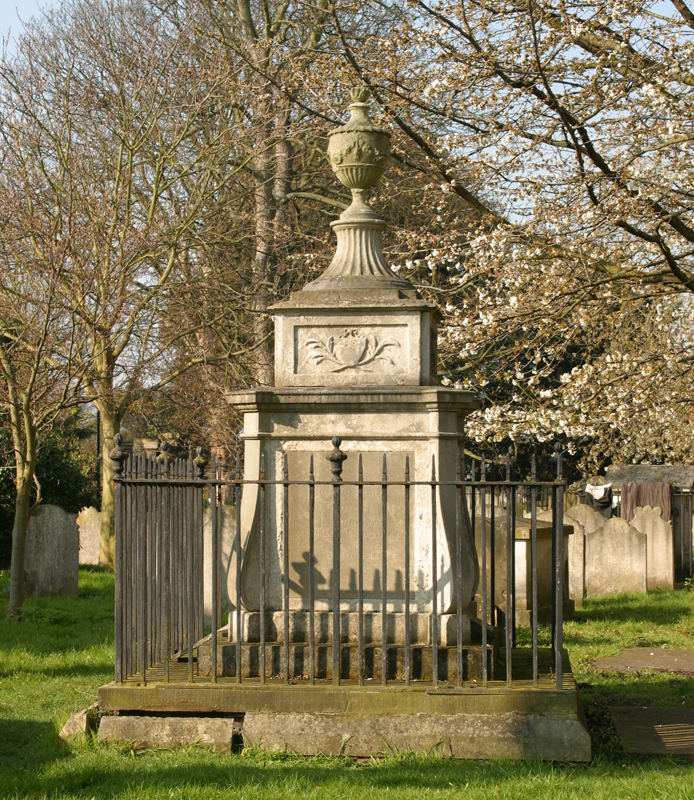
Tomb of William and Jane Hogarth at St Nicholas Church, Chiswick

Hogarth was buried at St. Nicholas Church, Chiswick, now in the west of London. His friend, actor David Garrick, composed the following inscription for his tombstone:

Farewell great Painter of Mankind
Who reach'd the noblest point of Art
Whose picture'd Morals charm the Mind
And through the Eye correct the Heart.

If Genius fire thee, Reader, stay,
If Nature touch thee, drop a Tear:
If neither move thee, turn away,
For Hogarth's honour'd dust lies here.

== Legacy ==
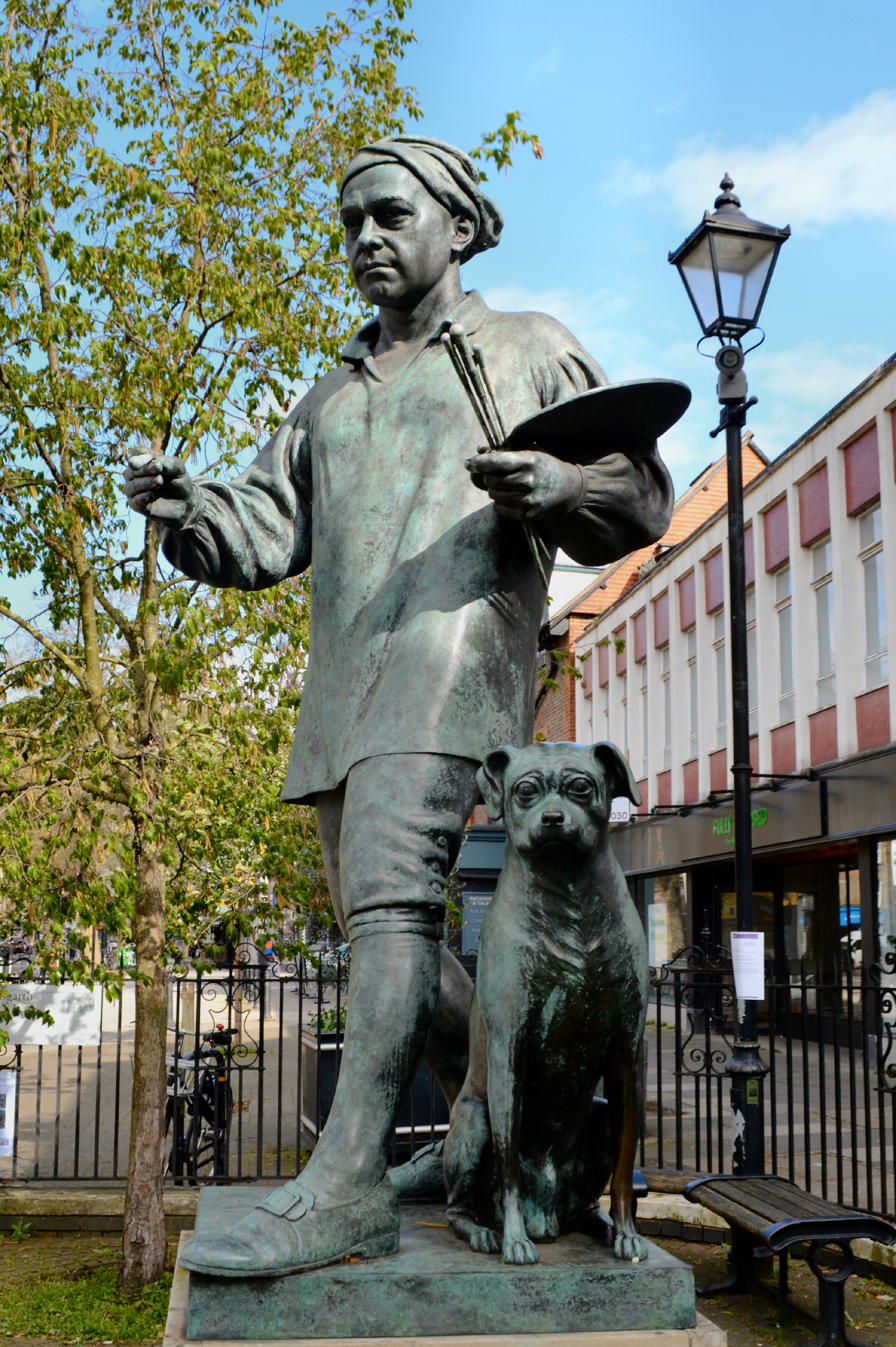
Statue of Hogarth with his dog Trump, Chiswick High Road

Hogarth's works were a direct influence on John Collier, who was known as the "Lancashire Hogarth". The spread of Hogarth's prints throughout Europe, together with the depiction of popular scenes from his prints in faked Hogarth prints, influenced Continental book illustration through the 18th and early 19th centuries, especially in Germany and France. He influenced many caricaturists of the 18th, 19th and 20th centuries. Hogarth's influence lives on today as artists continue to draw inspiration from his work.

Hogarth's paintings and prints have provided the subject matter for several other works. For example, Gavin Gordon's 1935 ballet The Rake's Progress, to choreography by Ninette de Valois, was based directly on Hogarth's series of paintings of that title. Igor Stravinsky's 1951 opera The Rake's Progress, with libretto by W. H. Auden, was less literally inspired by the same series.

Russell Banks' short story "Indisposed" is a fictional account of Hogarth's infidelity as told from the viewpoint of his wife, Jane. Hogarth was the lead character in Nick Dear's play The Art of Success, whilst he is played by Toby Jones in the 2006 television film A Harlot's Progress.

Hogarth's House in Chiswick, west London, is now a museum; the major road junction next to it is named the Hogarth Roundabout. In 2014 both Hogarth's House and the Foundling Museum held special exhibitions to mark the 250th anniversary of his death. In 2019, Sir John Soane's Museum, which owns both The Rake's Progress and The Humours of an Election, held an exhibition which assembled all Hogarth's series of paintings, and his series of engravings, in one place for the first time.

Stanley Kubrick based the cinematography of his 1975 period drama film, Barry Lyndon, on several Hogarth paintings.

In Roger Michell's 2003 film The Mother, starring Anne Reid and Daniel Craig, the protagonists visit Hogarth's tomb during their first outing together. They read aloud the poem inscribed there, and their shared admiration of Hogarth helps to affirm their connection with one another.

== Selected works ==
Paintings

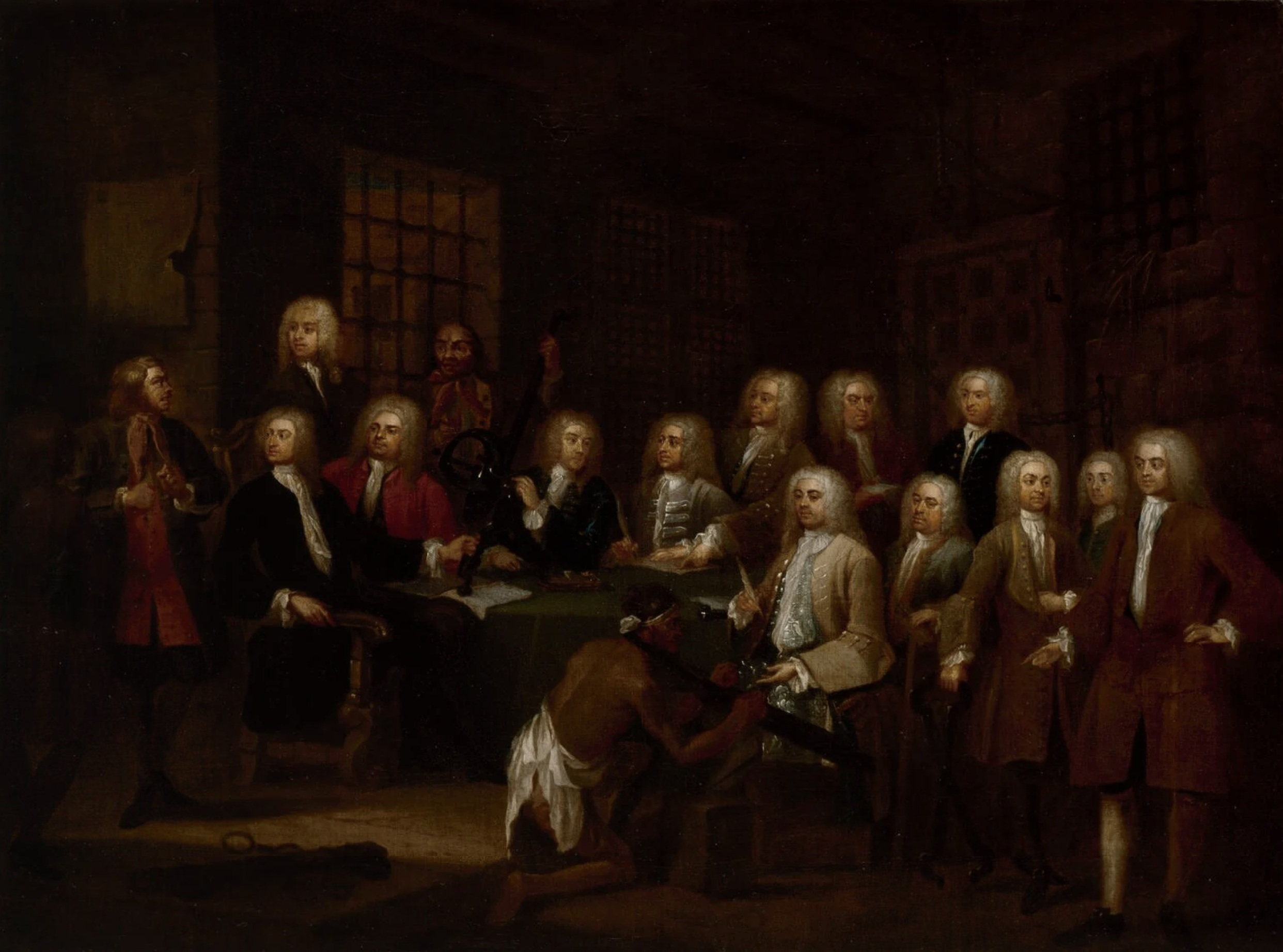
The Gaols Committee of the House of Commons, c. 1729

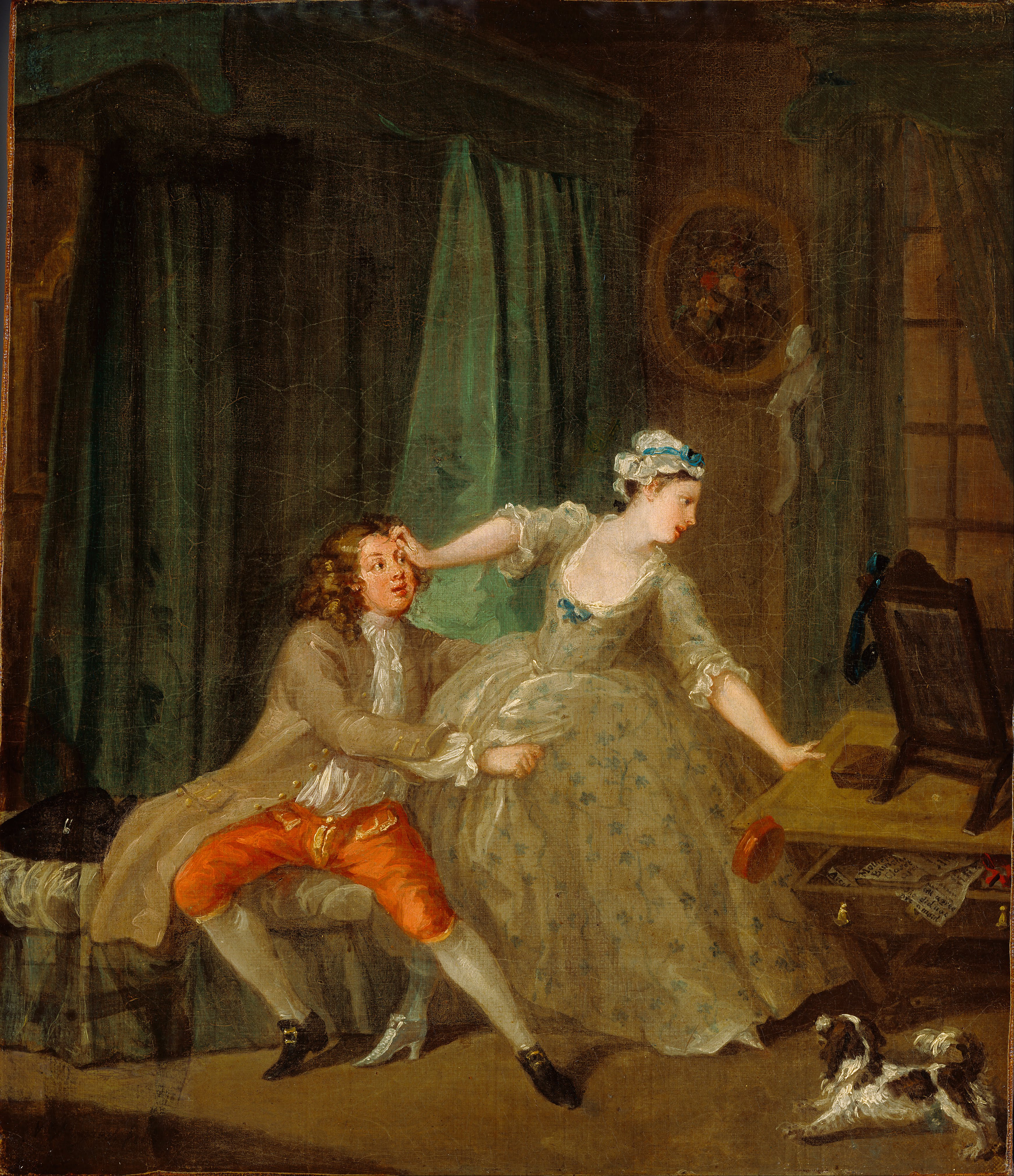
Before, 1731

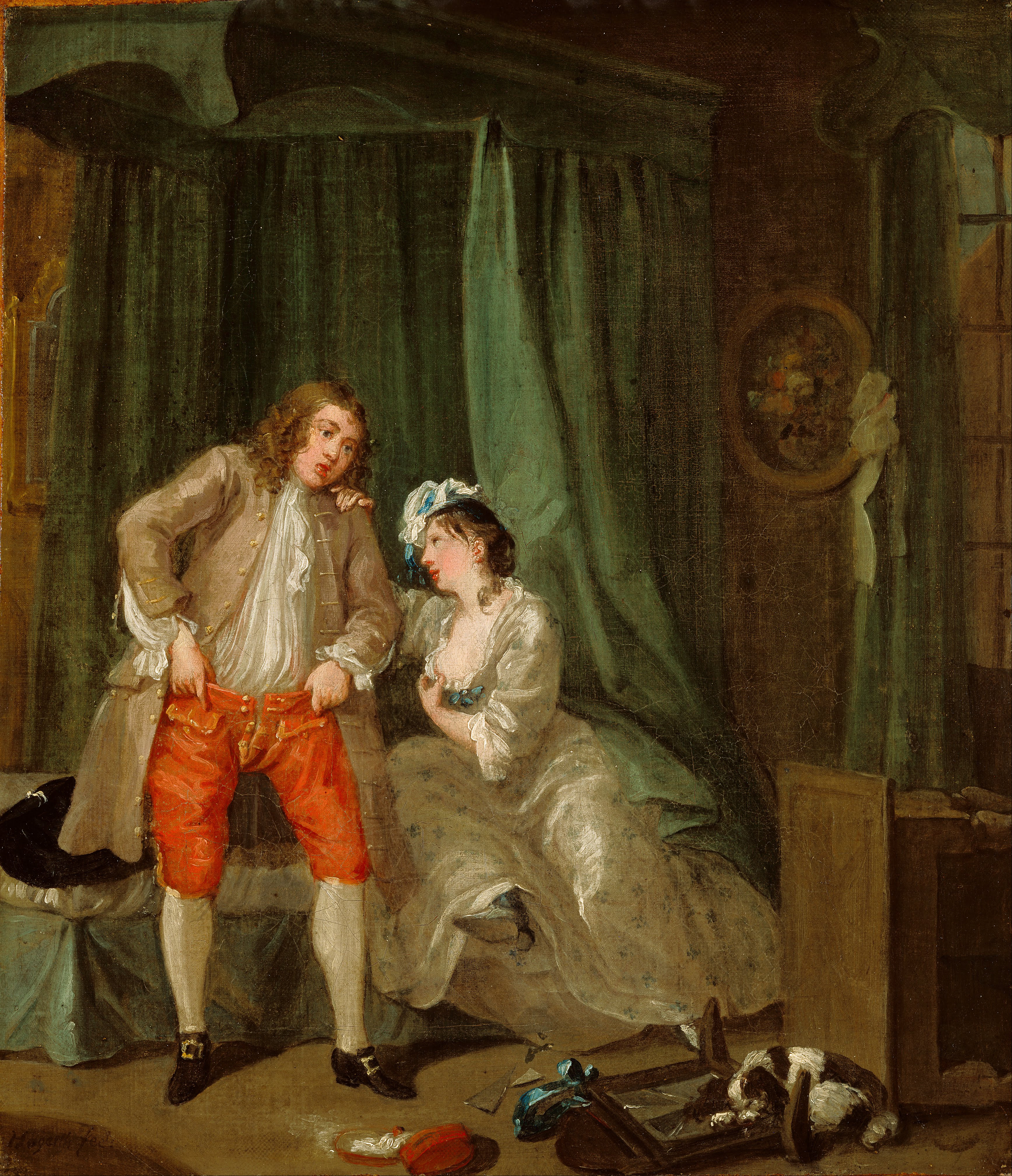
After, 1731

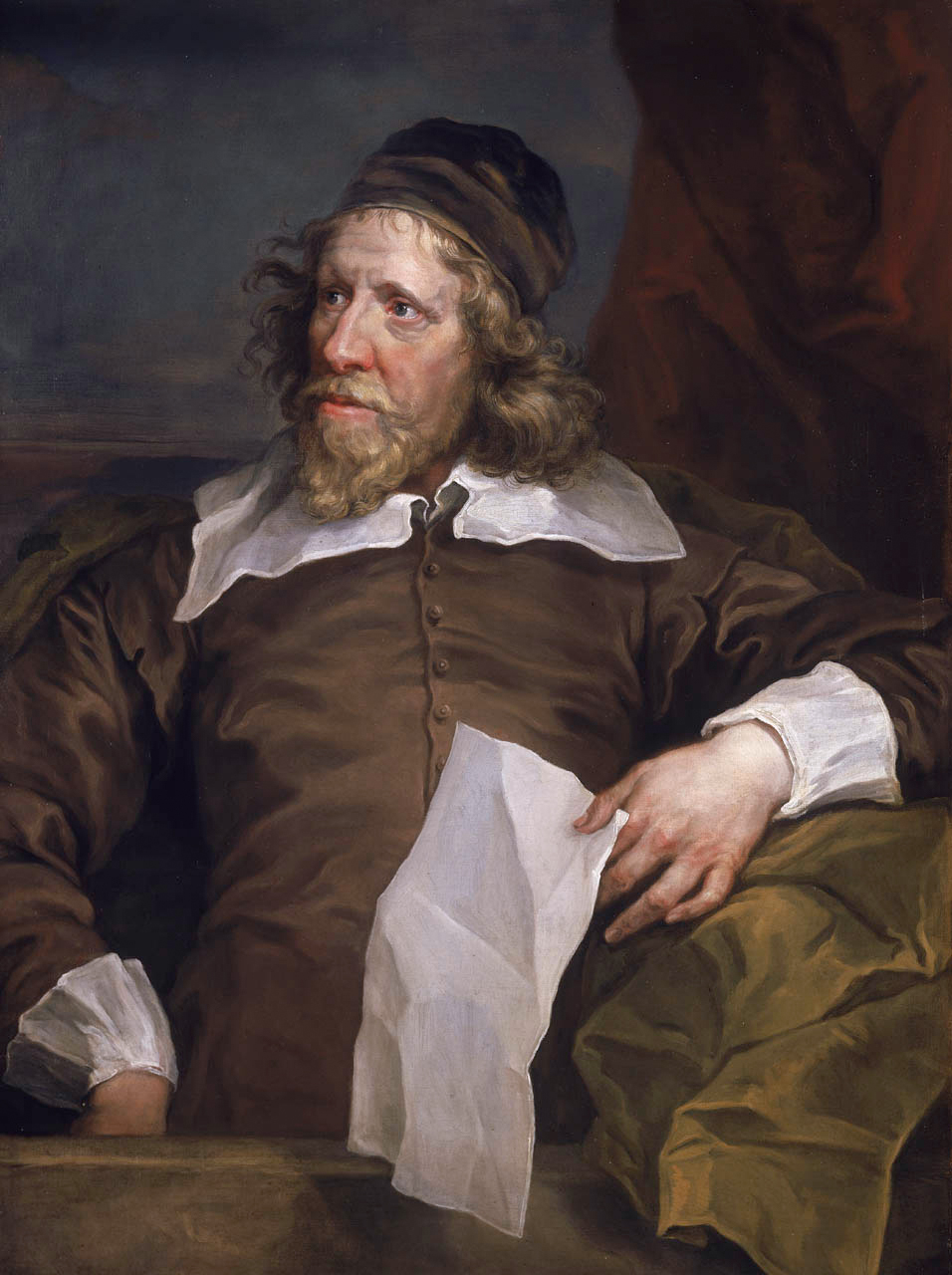
Portrait of Inigo Jones, English Architect

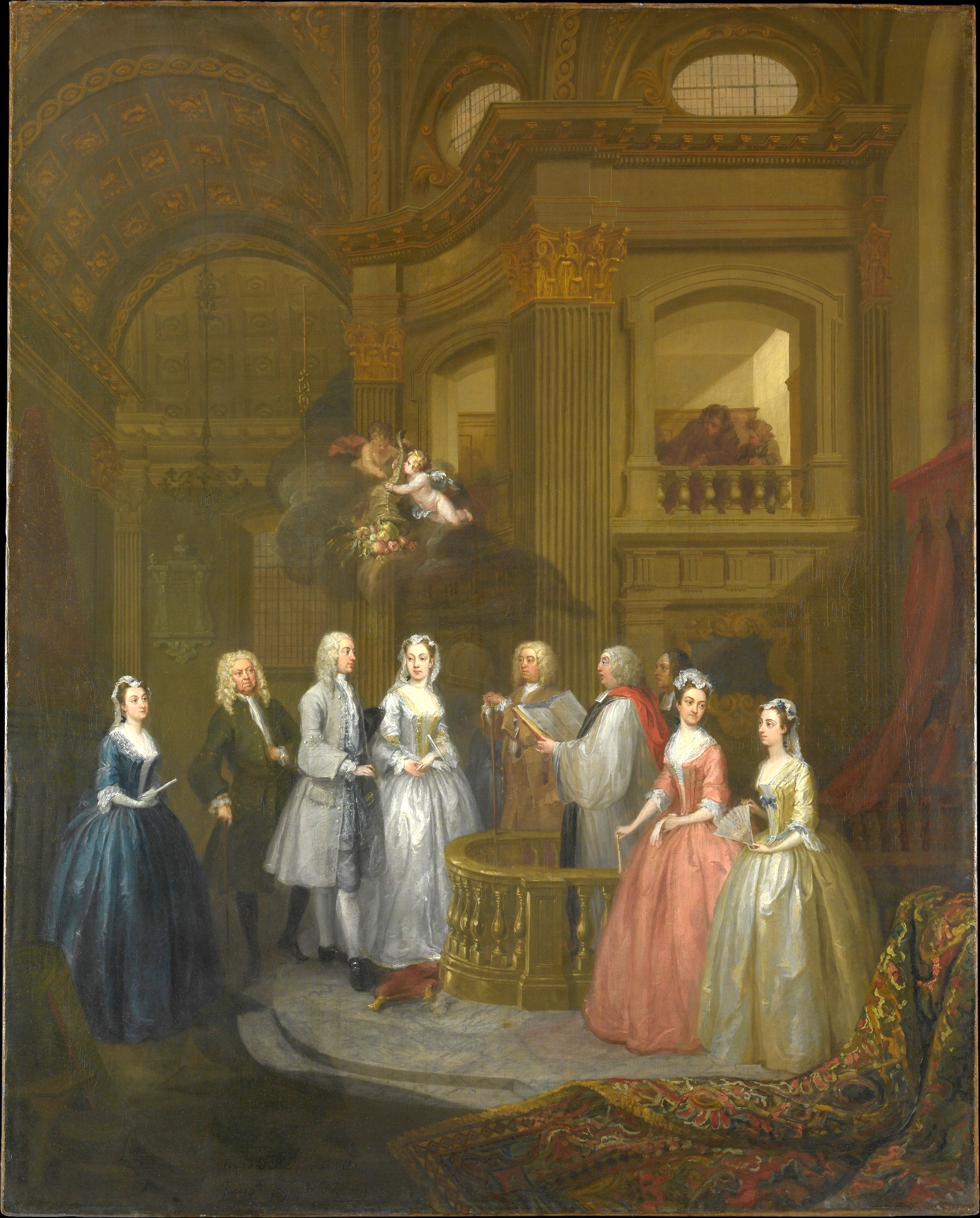
The Wedding of Stephen Beckingham and Mary Cox, 1729

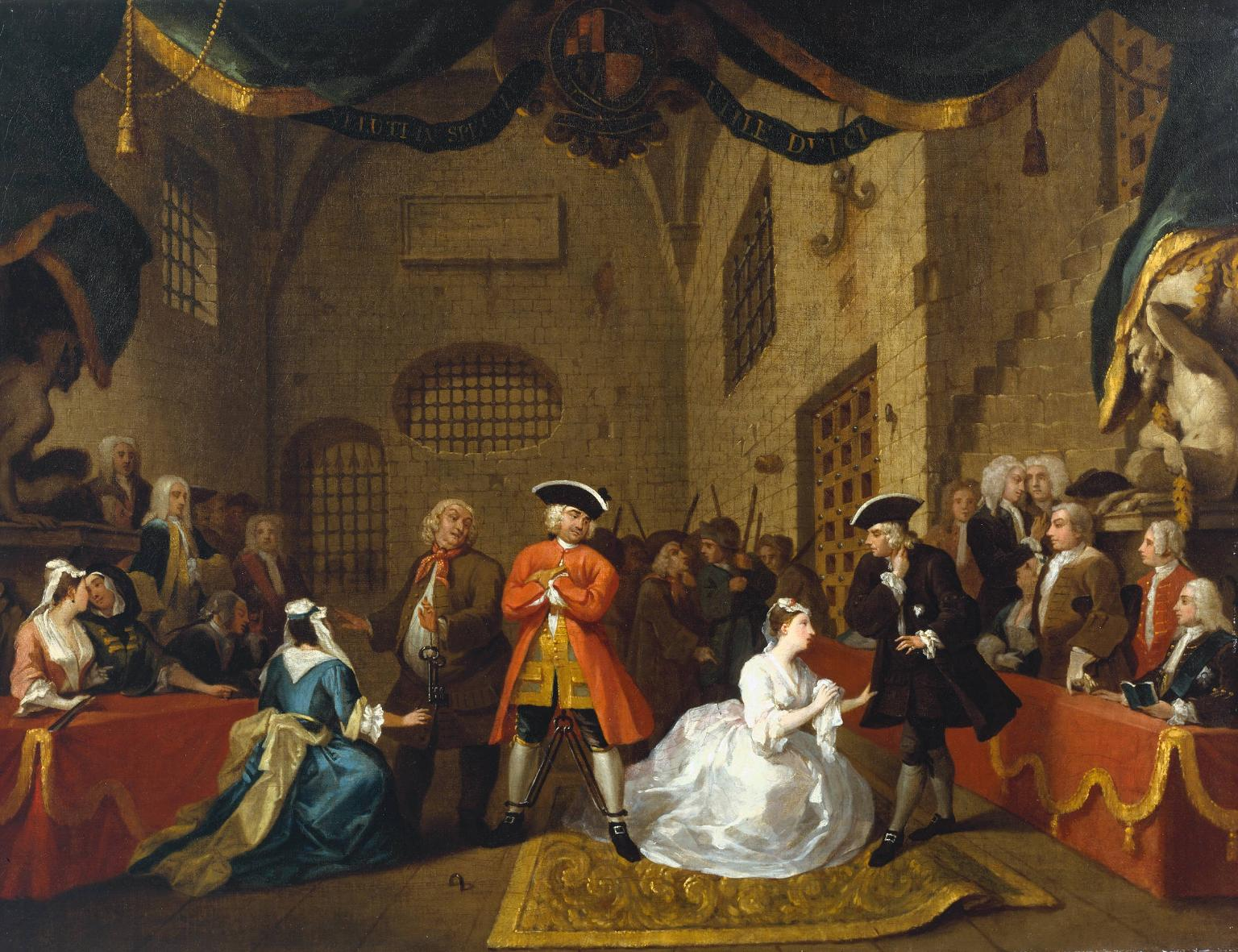
The Beggar's Opera VI, 1731, Tate Britain's version (22.5 x 30 ins.)

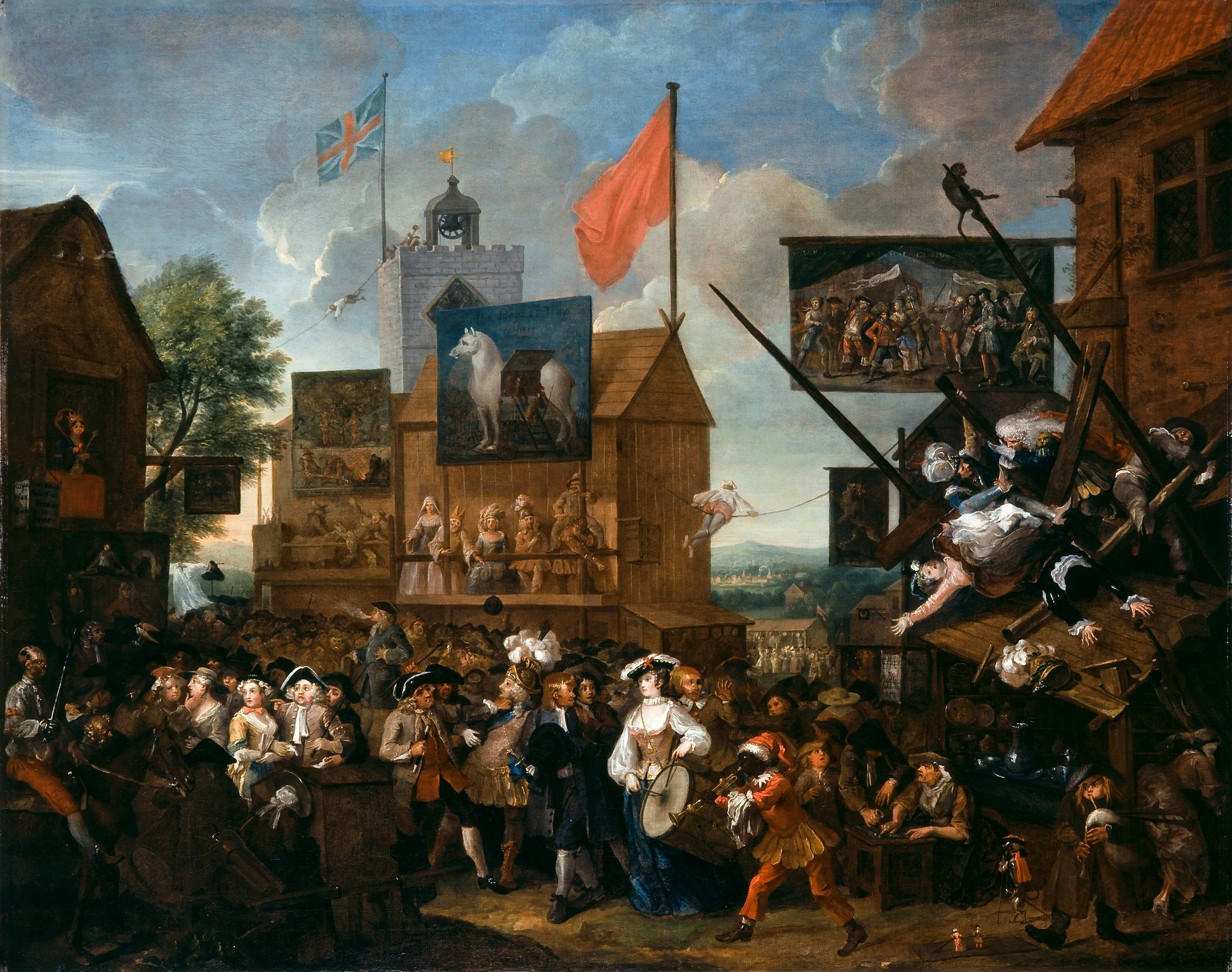
Southwark Fair, 1733

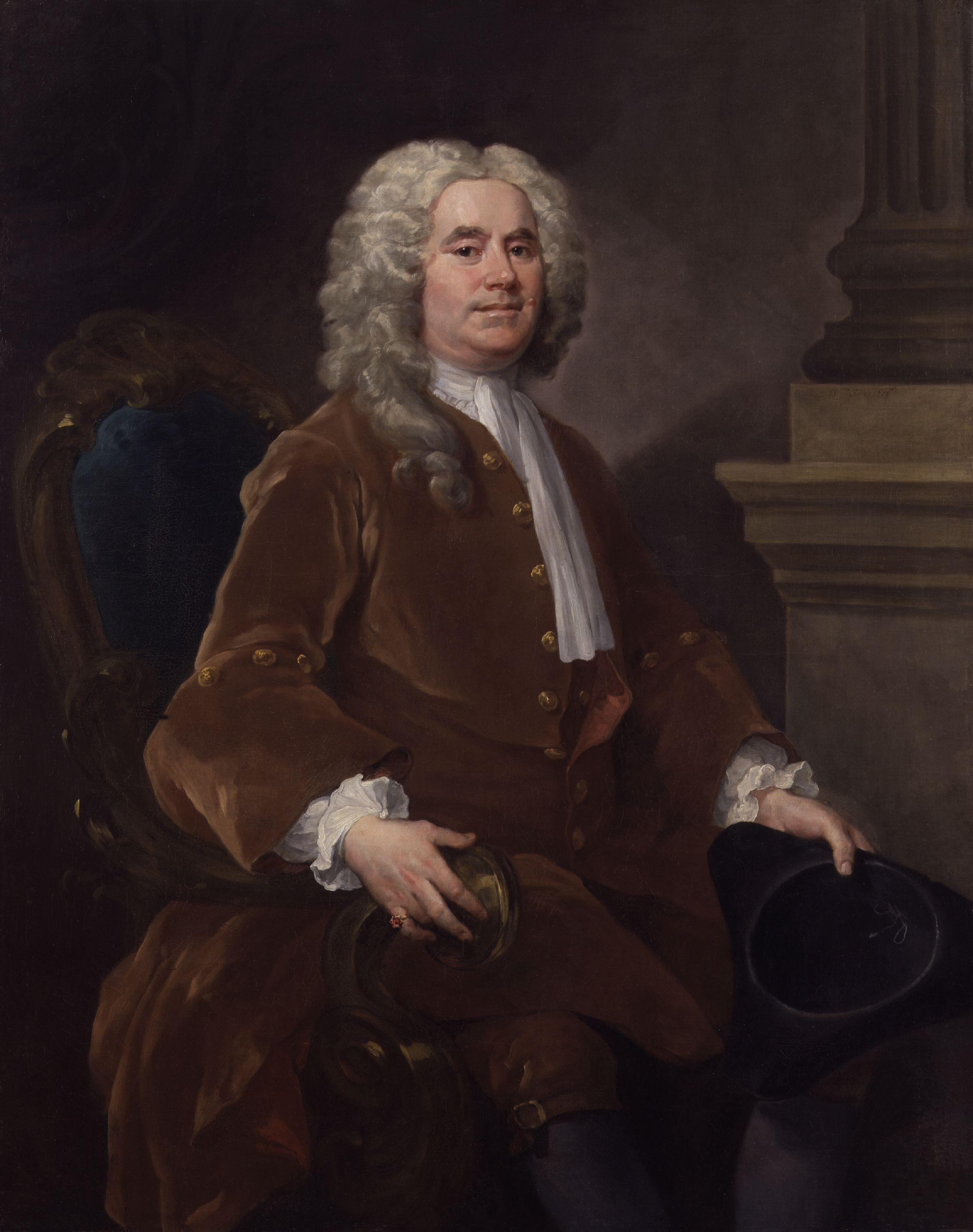
William Jones, the Mathematician, 1740

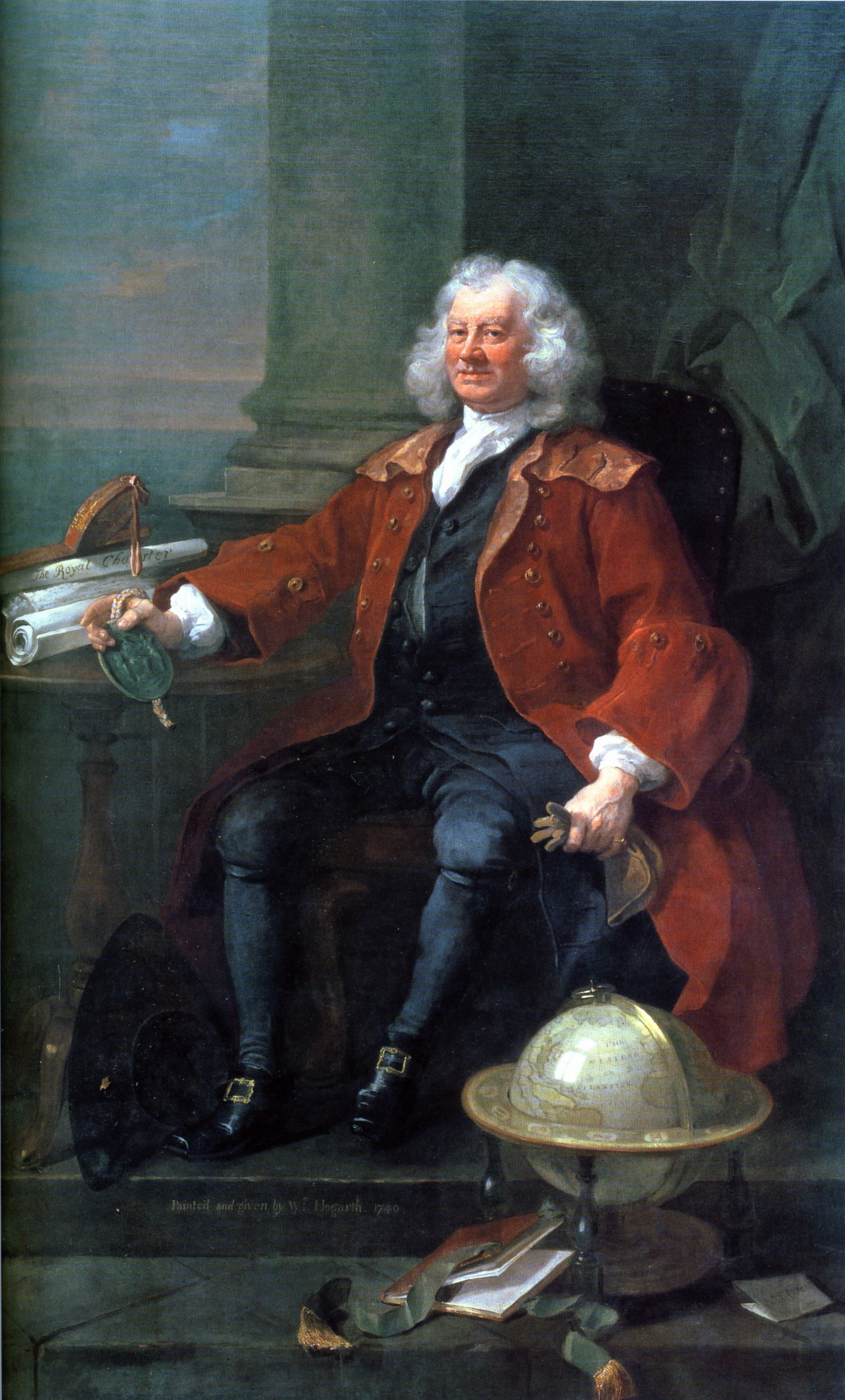
Portrait of Captain Thomas Coram, 1740

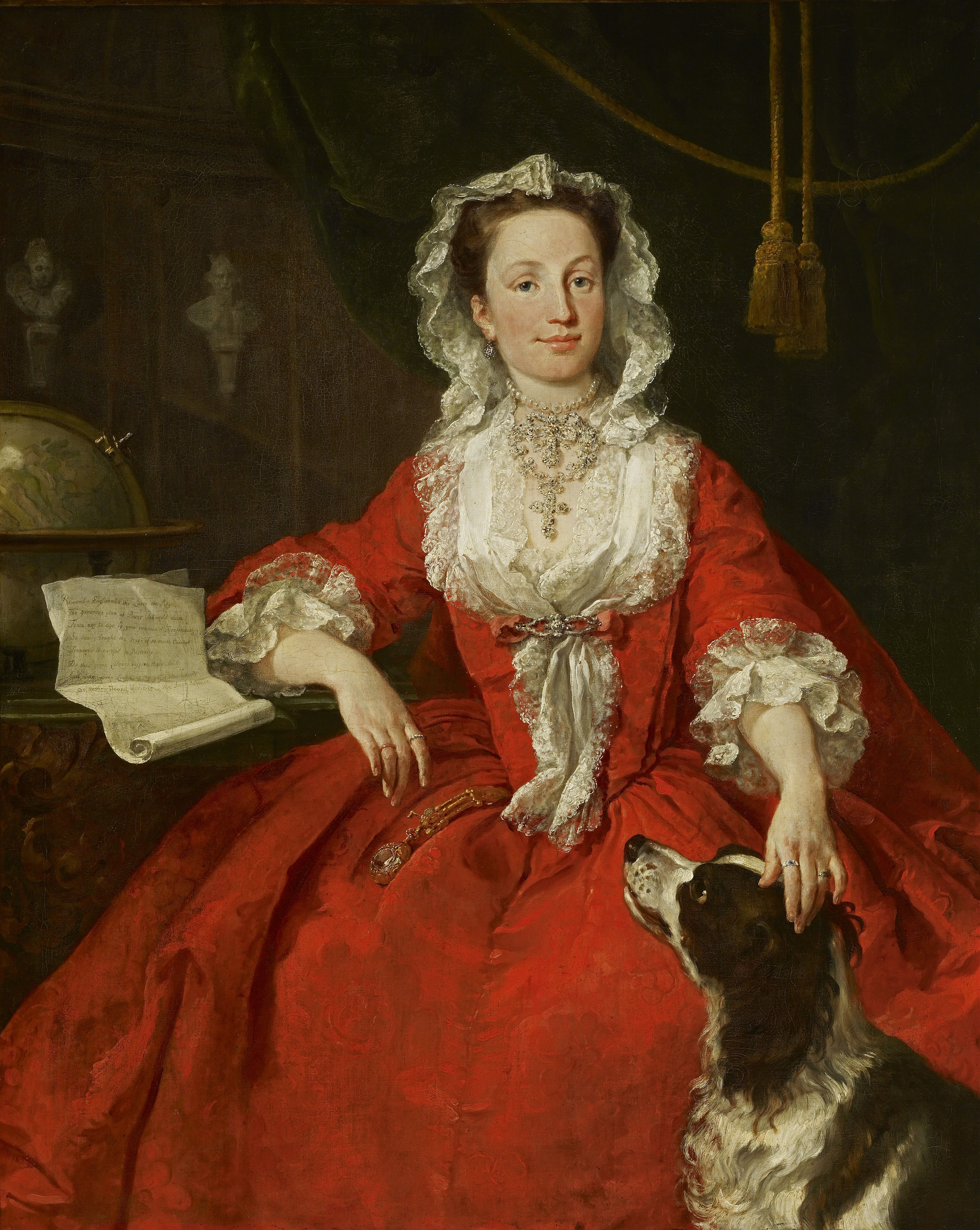
Miss Mary Edwards 1742

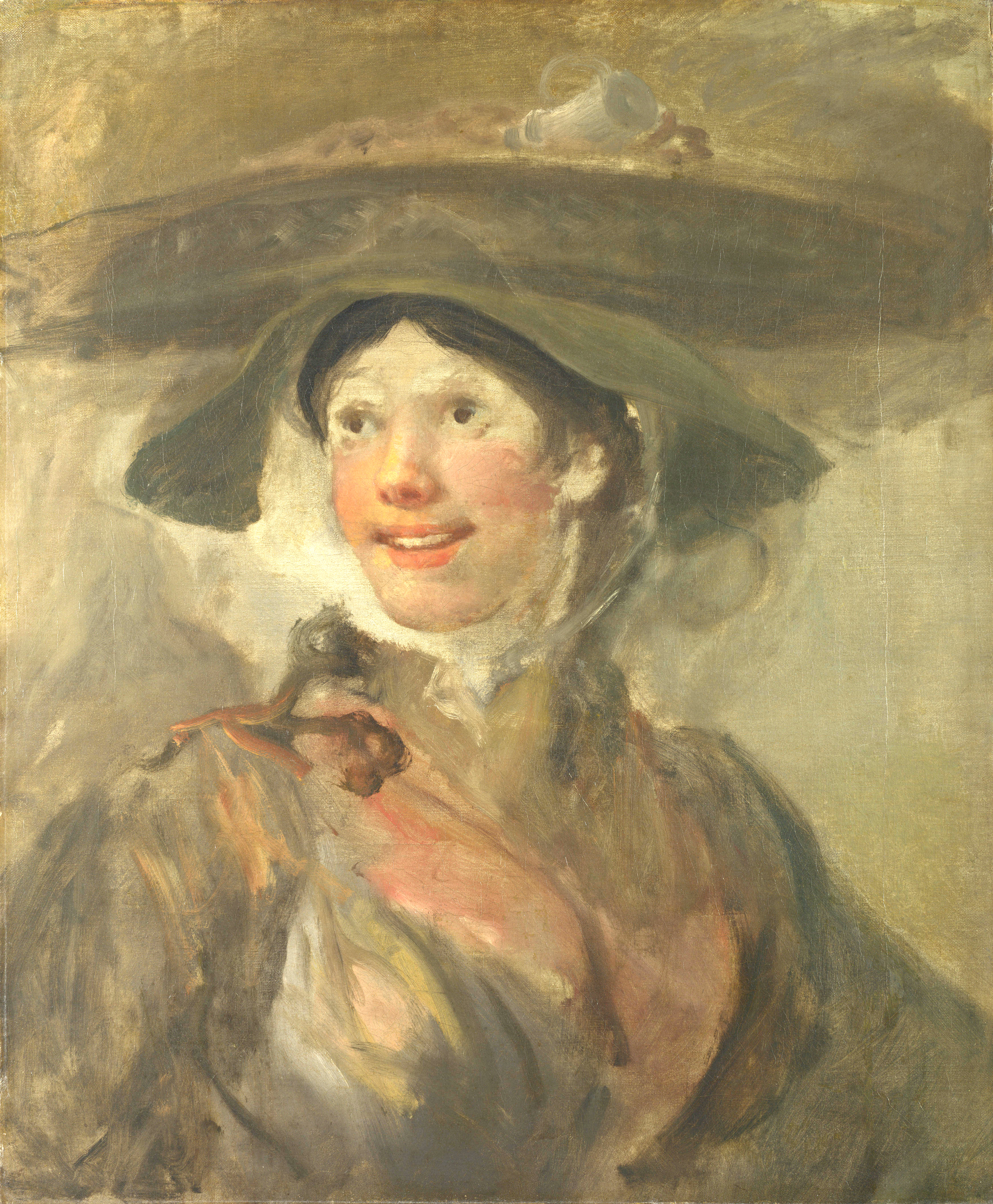
The Shrimp Girl 1740–1745

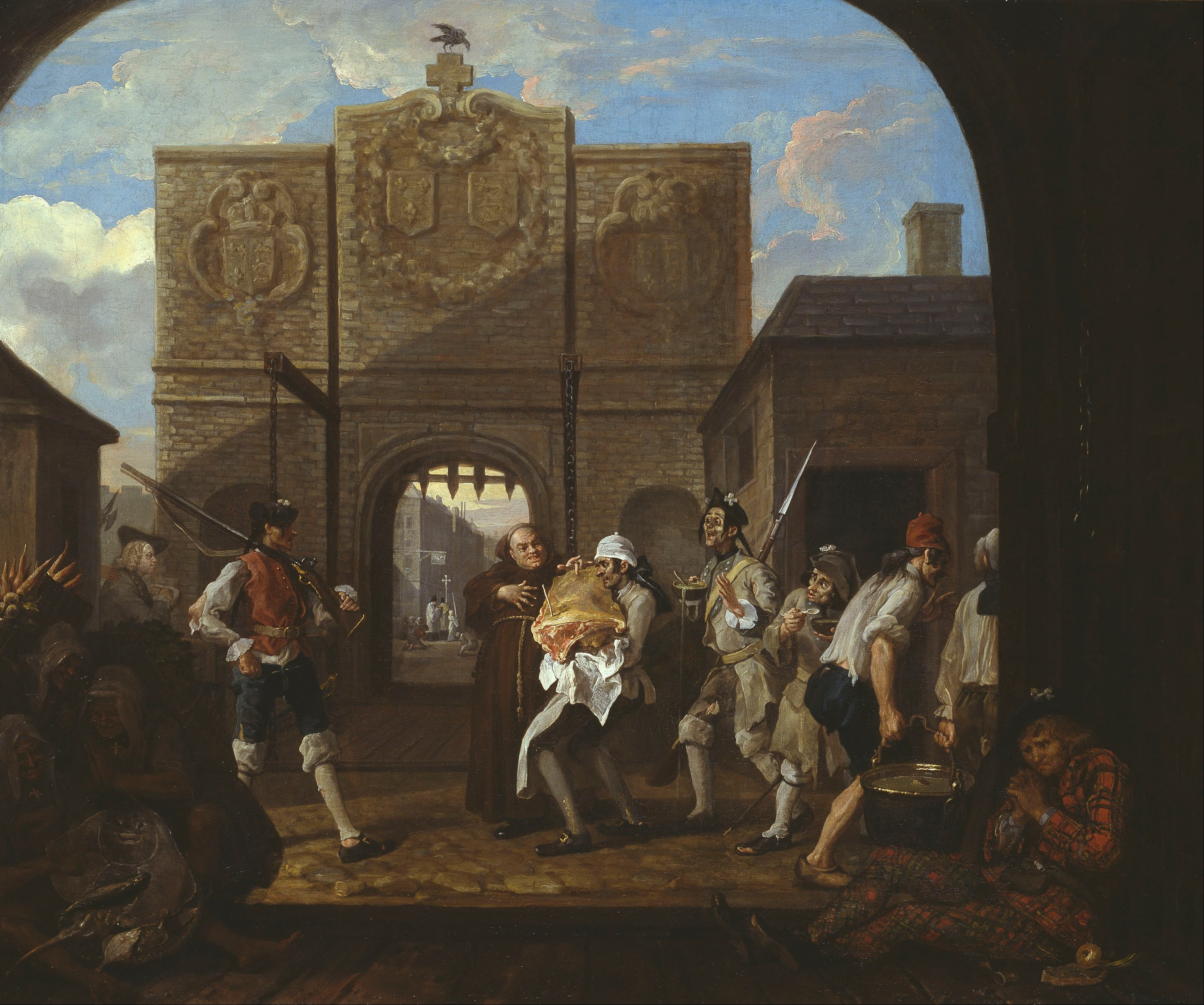
The Gate of Calais (also known as O the Roast Beef of Old England), 1749

March of the Guards to Finchley (1750), a satirical depiction of troops mustered to defend London from the Jacobite Army

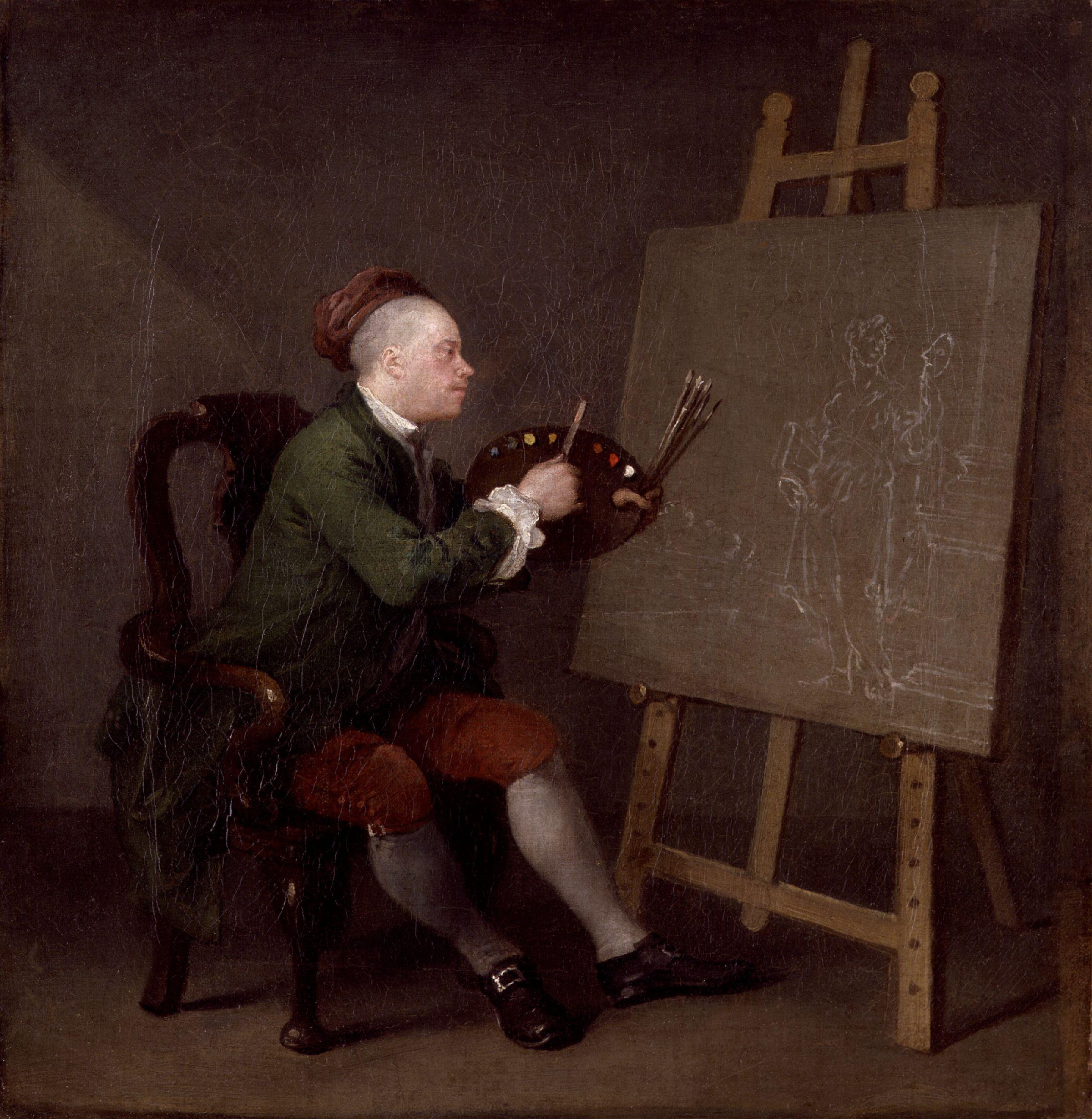
Hogarth Painting the Comic Muse. A self-portrait depicting Hogarth painting Thalia, the muse of comedy and pastoral poetry, 1757–1758

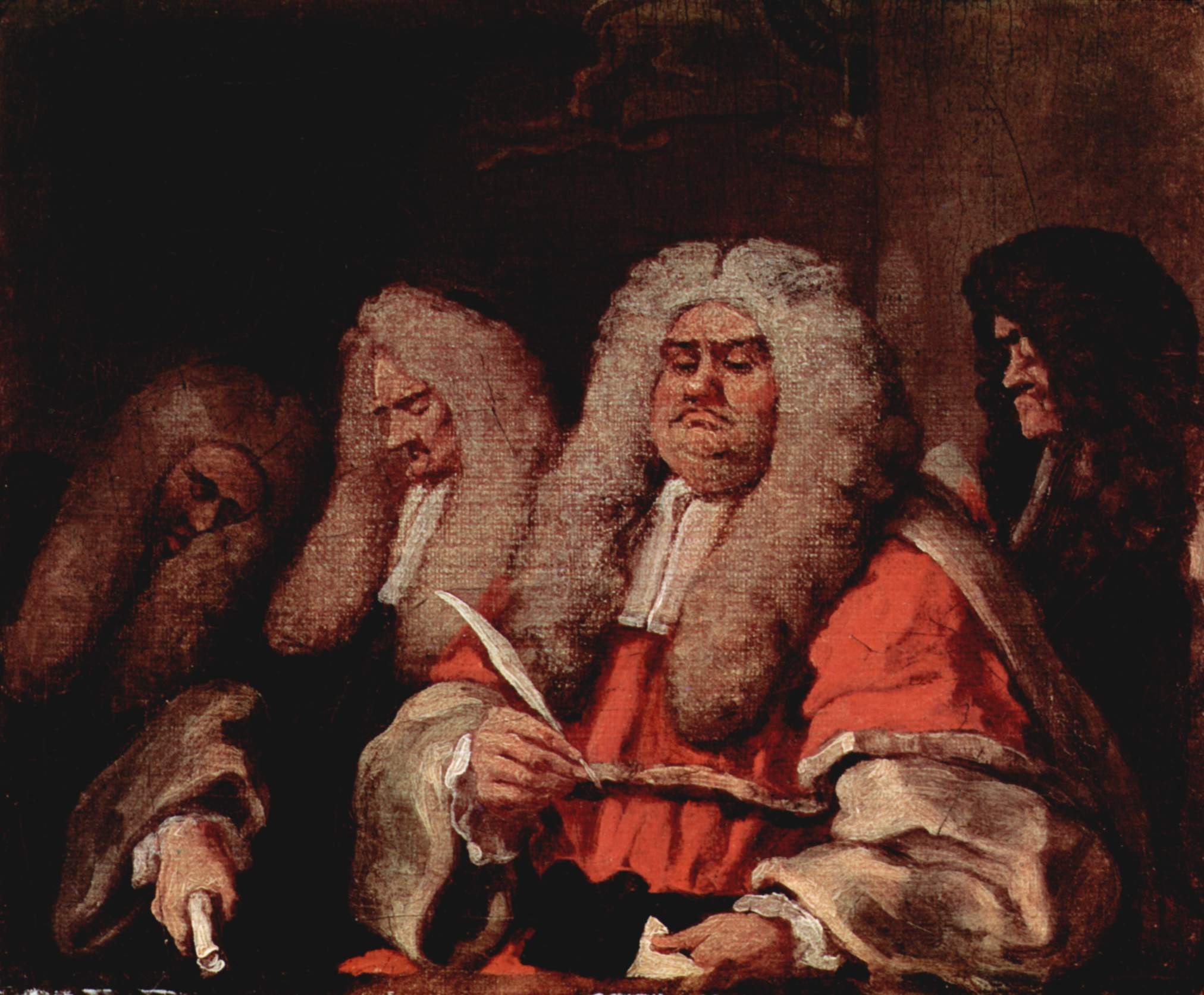
The Bench, 1758

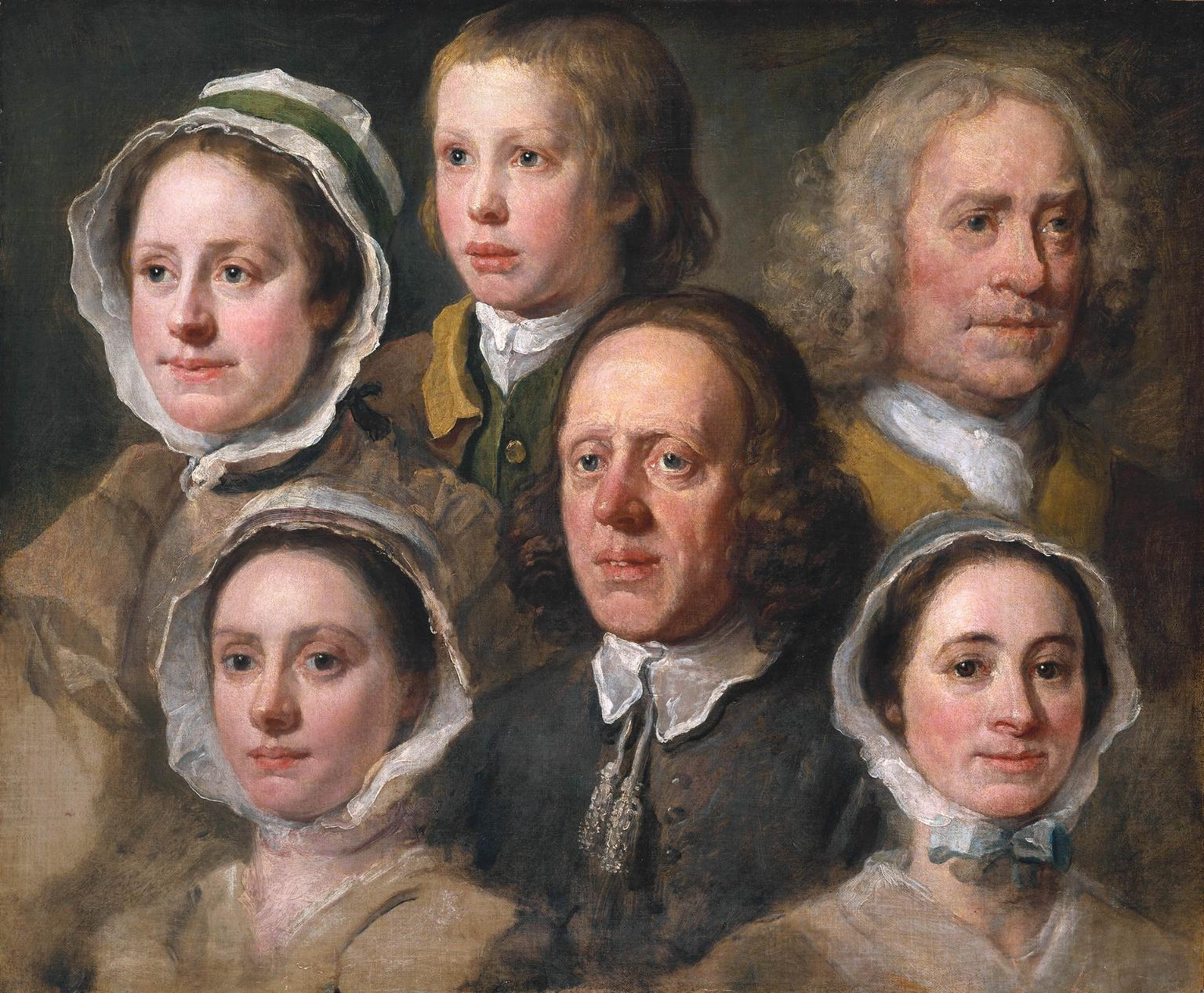
Hogarth's Servants, mid-1750s.

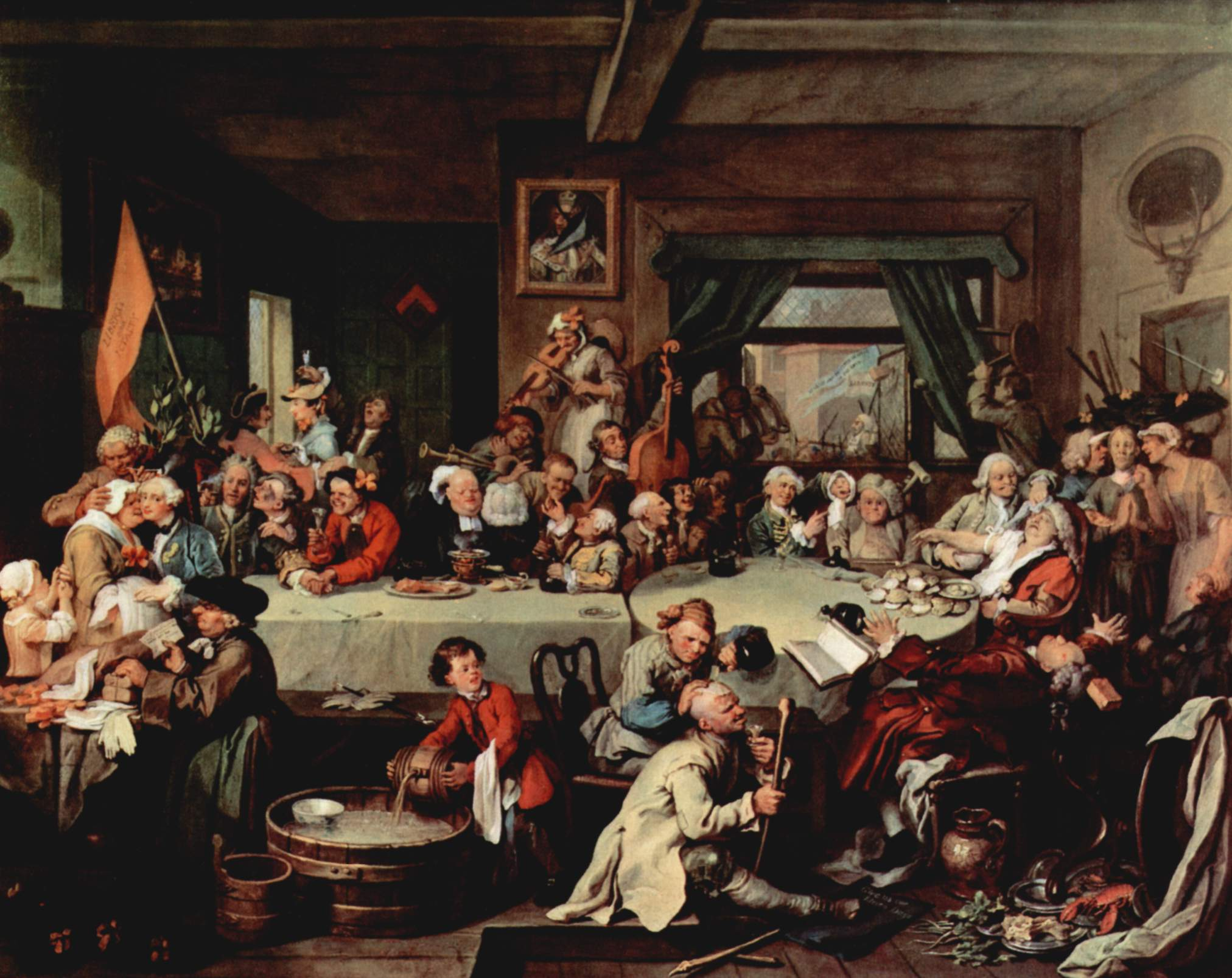
An Election Entertainment featuring the anti-Gregorian calendar banner "Give us our Eleven Days", 1755.

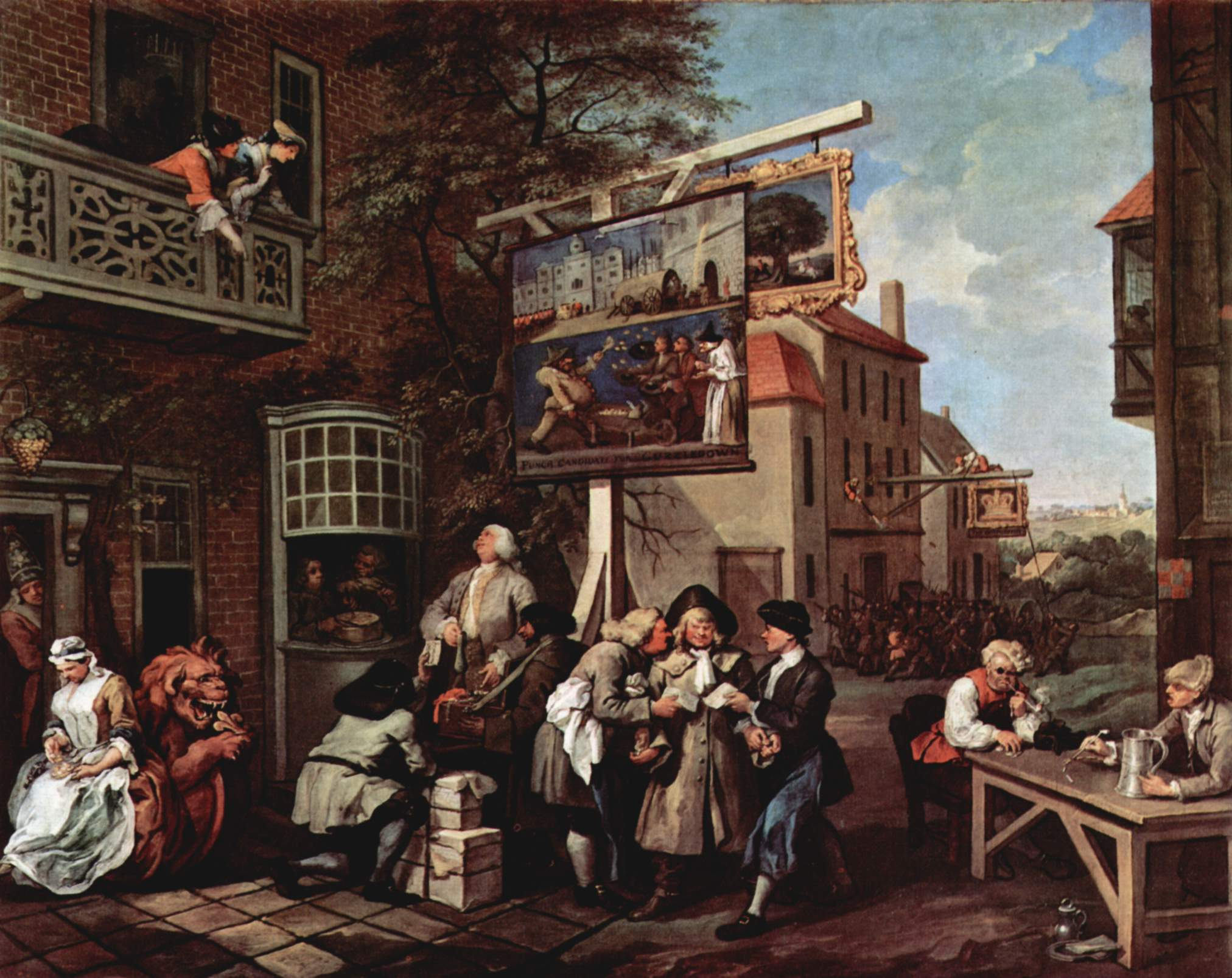
William Hogarth's Election series, Humours of an Election, plate 2

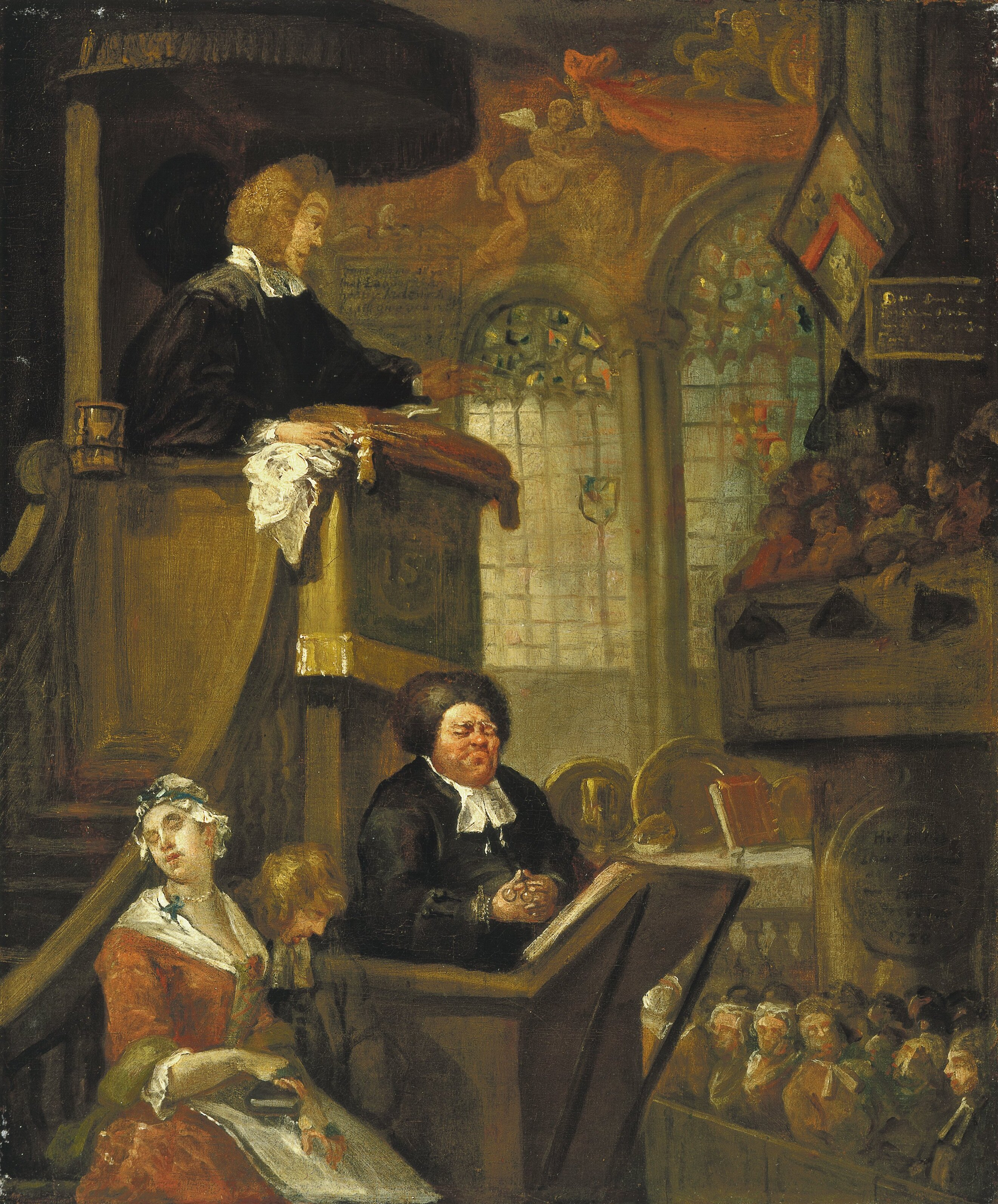
The Sleeping Congregation, 1728, Minneapolis Institute of Art
Engravings

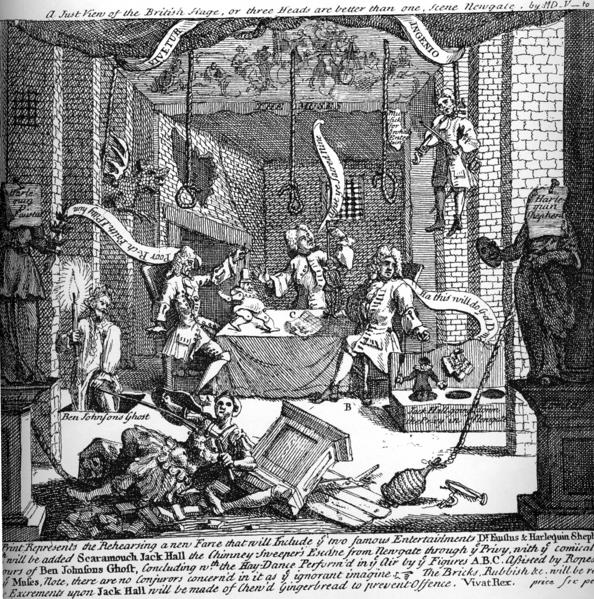
An early print of 1724, A Just View of the British Stage

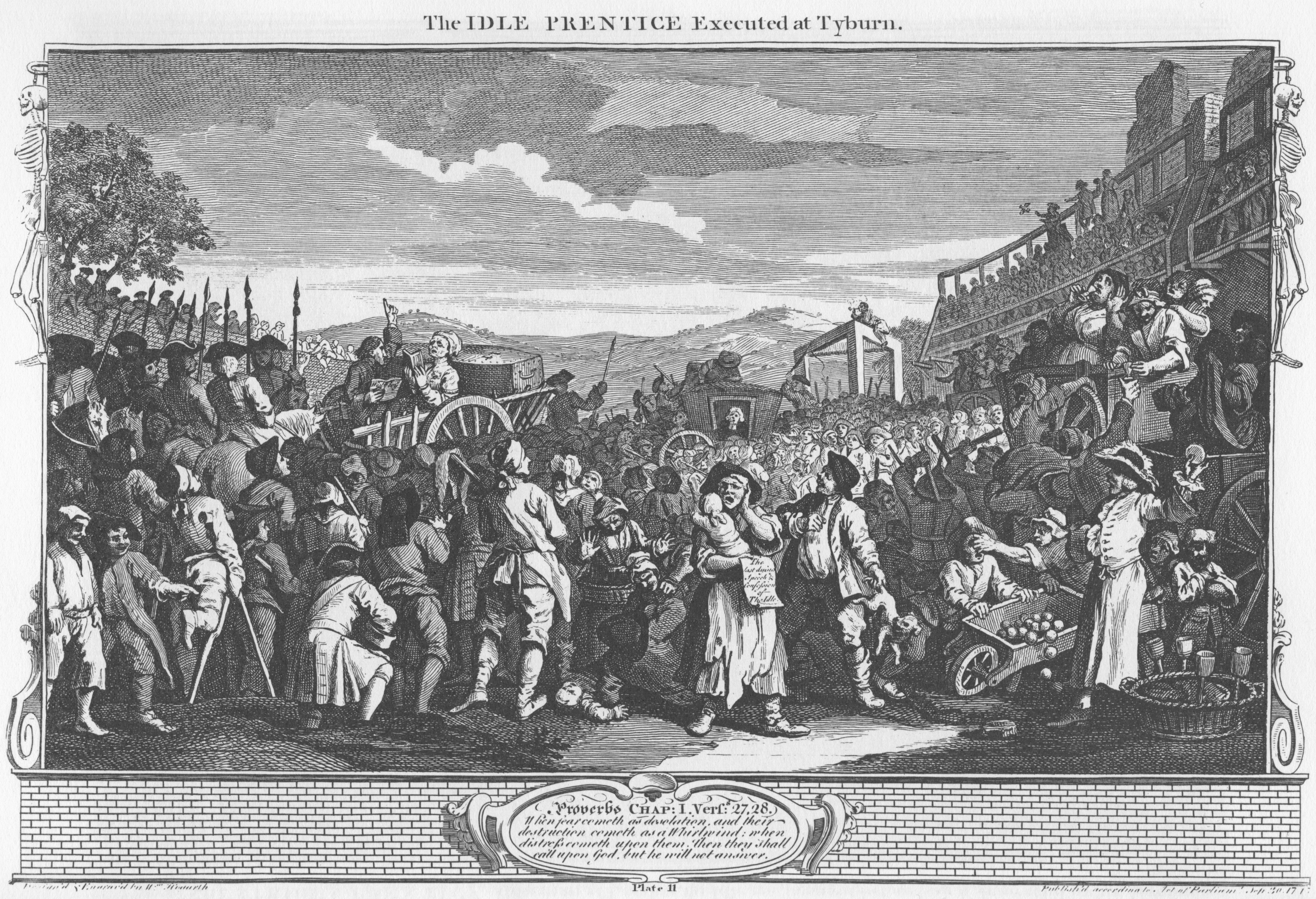
Industry and Idleness, plate 11, The Idle 'Prentice executed at Tyburn

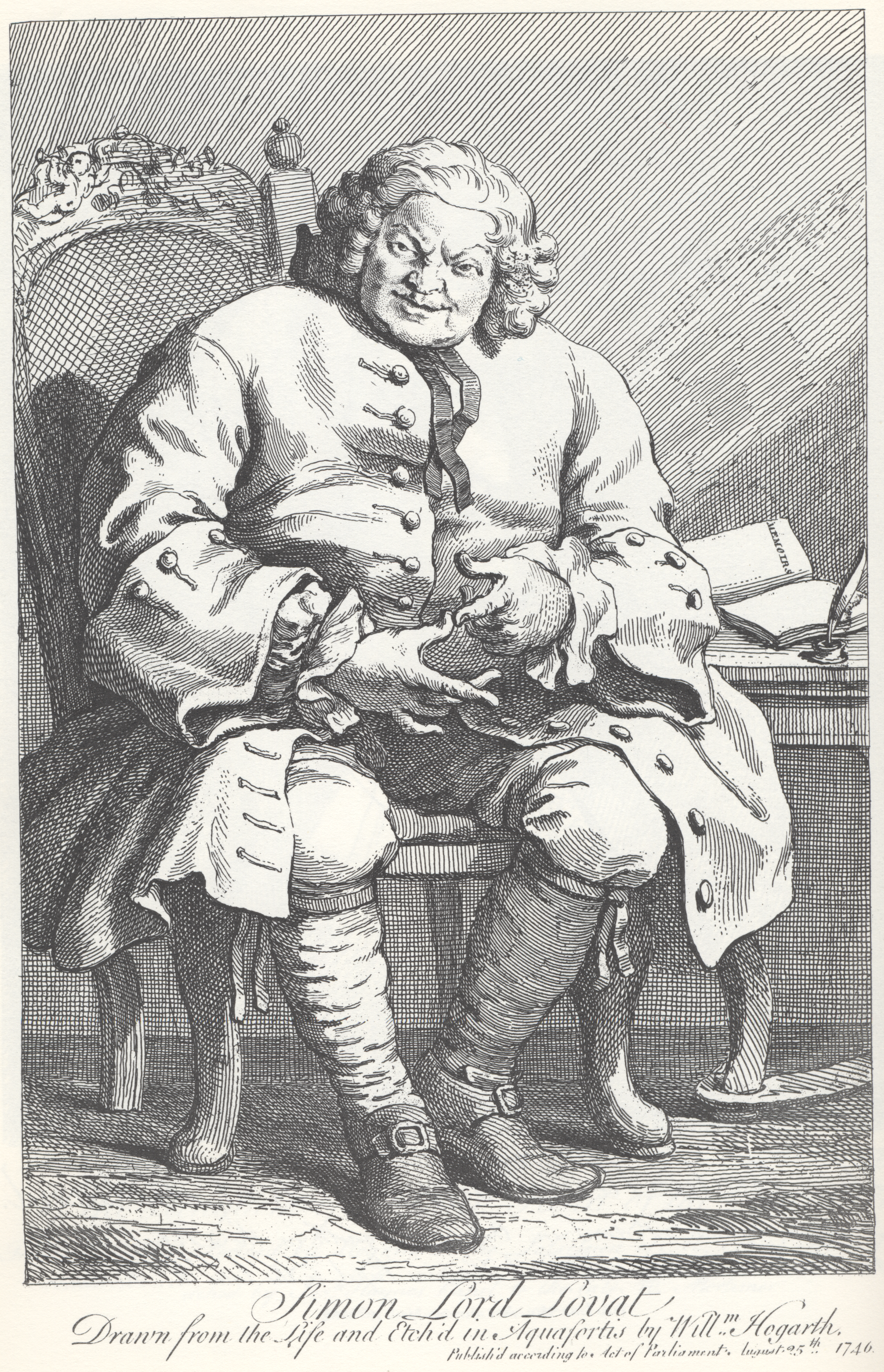
William Hogarth's engraving of the Jacobite Lord Lovat prior to his execution

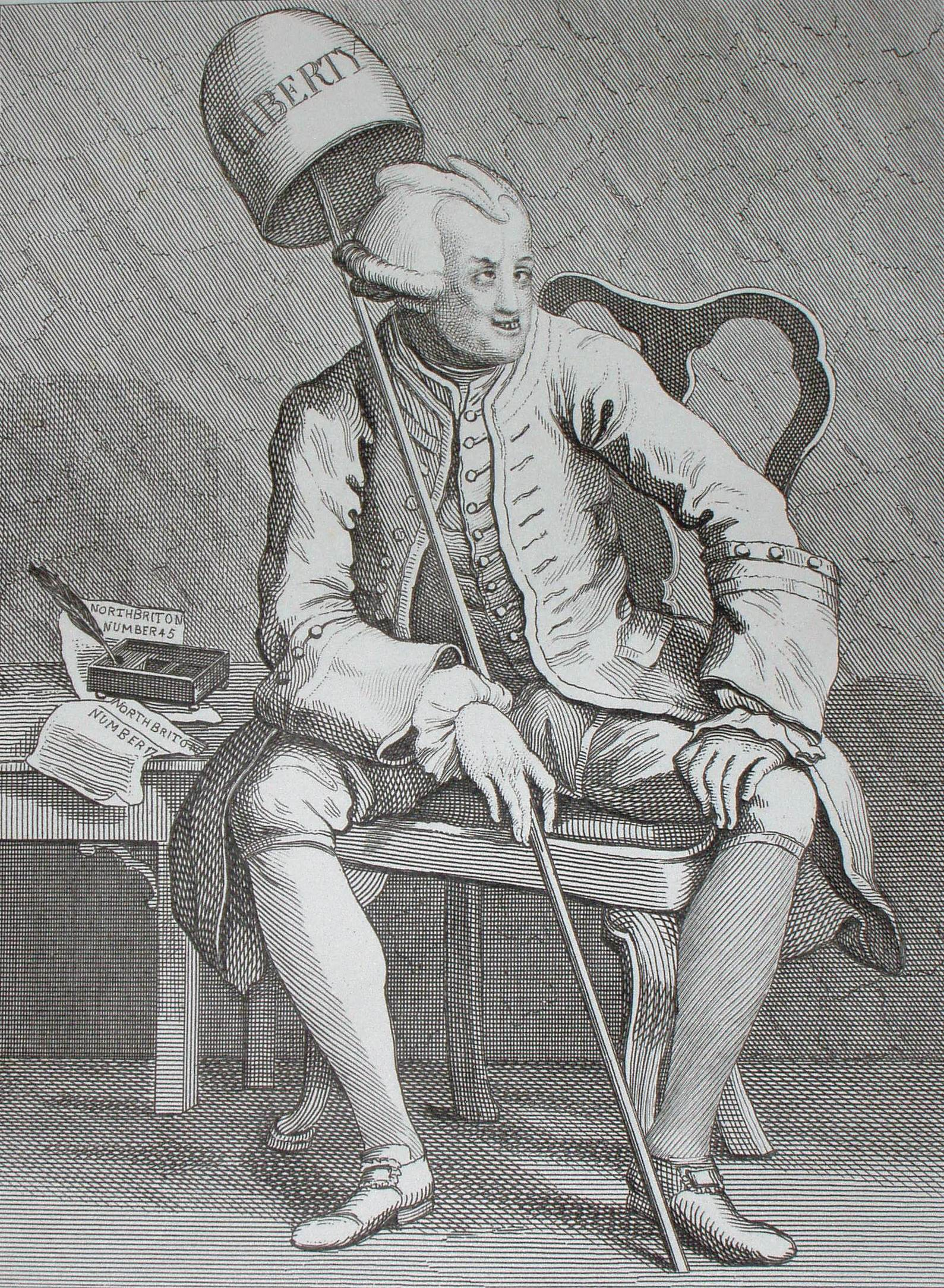
Hogarth's satirical engraving of the radical politician John Wilkes.

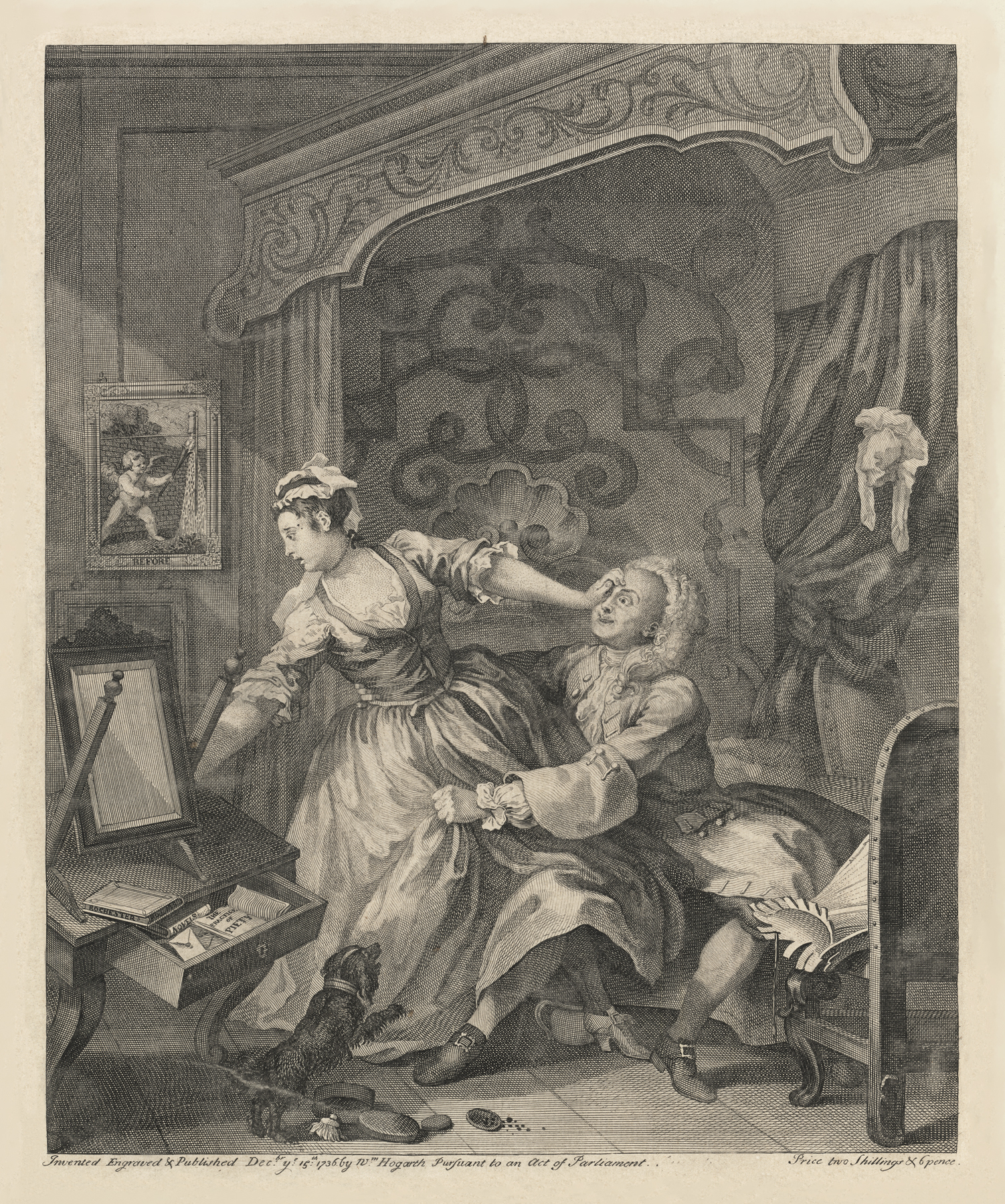
Engraving, Before the 1736 print, based on the earlier "oyl"

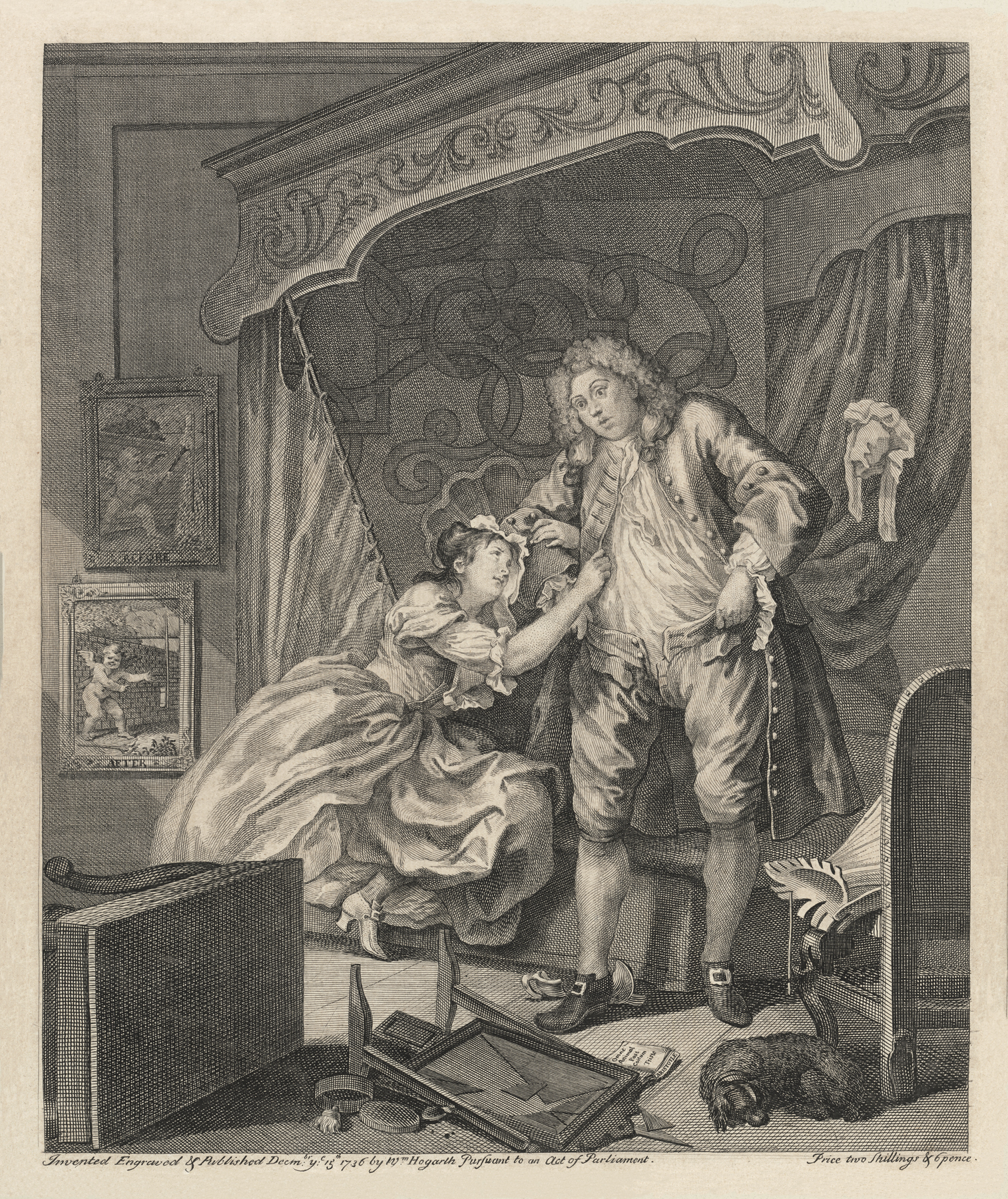
Engraving, After

== See also ==
- List of works by William Hogarth
- Ronald Paulson, leading expert on Hogarth
- Judy Egerton, Hogarth curator and commentator

General:

- English art
