= Satire on False Perspective =

Engraving by William Hogarth

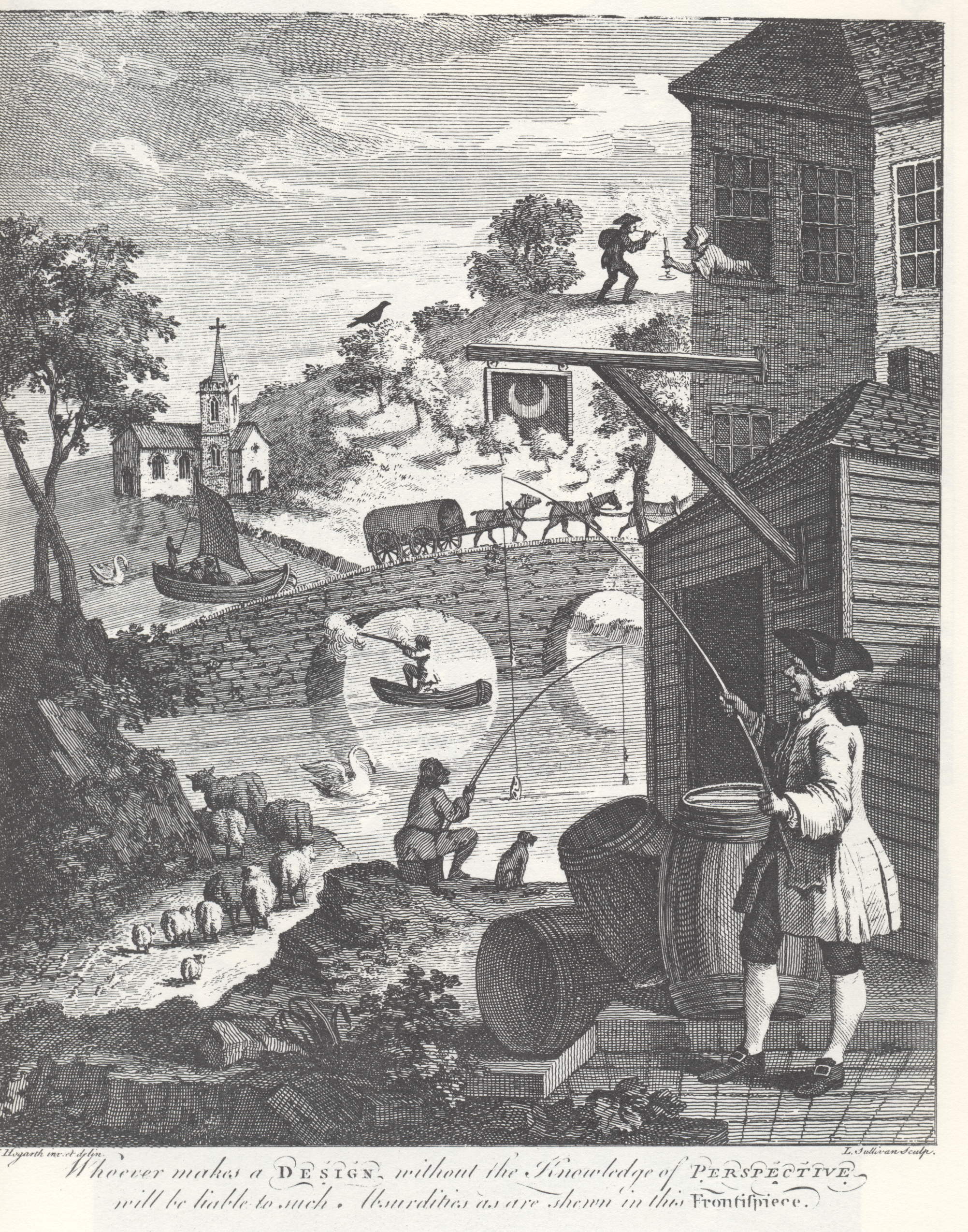
- Artist: William Hogarth
- Year: 1754
- Type: engraving

Satire on False Perspective is the title of an engraving produced by the English artist William Hogarth in 1754 for his friend Joshua Kirby's pamphlet on linear perspective.

The intent of the work is clearly given by its caption:

Whoever makes a Design without the Knowledge of Perspective will be liable to such Absurdities as are shewn in this Frontiſpiece [frontispiece].

== Summary ==
The work shows a scene that provides many deliberate examples of confused and misplaced perspective effects. Although the individual components of the scene seem self-consistent, the scene itself can be classed as an example of an impossible object.

=== Partial list of "errors" ===
1. The man in the foreground's fishing rod's line passes behind that of the man behind him.
2. The sign is moored to two buildings, one in front of the other, with beams that show no difference in depth
3. The sign is overlapped by two distant trees.
4. The man climbing the hill is lighting his pipe with the candle of the woman leaning out of the upper story window.
5. The crow perched on the tree is massive in comparison to it.
6. The church appears to front onto the river. Both ends of the church are viewable at the same time.
7. The left horizon on the water declines precipitously.
8. The man in the boat under the bridge fires at the swan on the other side, which is impossible as he's aiming straight at the bridge abutments.
9. The right-hand end of the arch above the boat meets the water further from the viewer than does the left-hand end.
10. The two-story building, though viewed from below, shows the top of the roof, as does the church tower in the distance.
11. The barrel closest to the foreground fisherman reveals both its top and bottom simultaneously.
12. The tiles the foreground fisherman stands on have a vanishing point that converge towards the viewer.
13. A tree is growing out of the top of the bridge.
14. The vanishing point for the near side of the first building transforms midway down the wall.
15. The line of trees obscuring the sign are likely representative of how objects should decrease in scale as they move further away, but in this case reversed.
16. The sheep on the left-hand side increase in scale as they get further away.
17. The swan behind the boat is larger than the men manning the boat.
18. The base of the tree on the far left is behind the tree to the right of it, but the canopy is in front of the tree to the right of it.
19. The canopy of the tree on the far left is behind the roof of the church though the church is far behind it.
20. The left-most barrel appears to be on lower ground than the other two, when they should be on level ground.
21. The bottom swan is slightly smaller than the cow.
22. The man with the pipe is taller than the trees.
23. The tops and bottoms of the windows on the second building have different vanishing points.
24. The prows of each boat reveal an exaggerated amount of the port side.
25. The arch bridge lacks voussoirs.

Aside from the impossibilities of scale, there are in fact approximately 10 different horizons based on the various vanishing points.

== Historiography of perspective instruction ==
Until Brook Taylor's treatise on linear perspective was published in 1715, artists were taught perspective by studying methods used in earlier works by famous artists, rather than studying the mathematics behind the methods. Hogarth created the St Martin's Lane Academy partially to remedy this gap in studies, and he invited his friend Kirby to become a perspective teacher there. Kirby obliged and later, by publishing his pamphlet, became famous enough to gain a royal appointment as a perspective teacher.

== See also ==
- List of works by William Hogarth
