= Portrait of Captain Thomas Coram =

Painting by William Hogarth

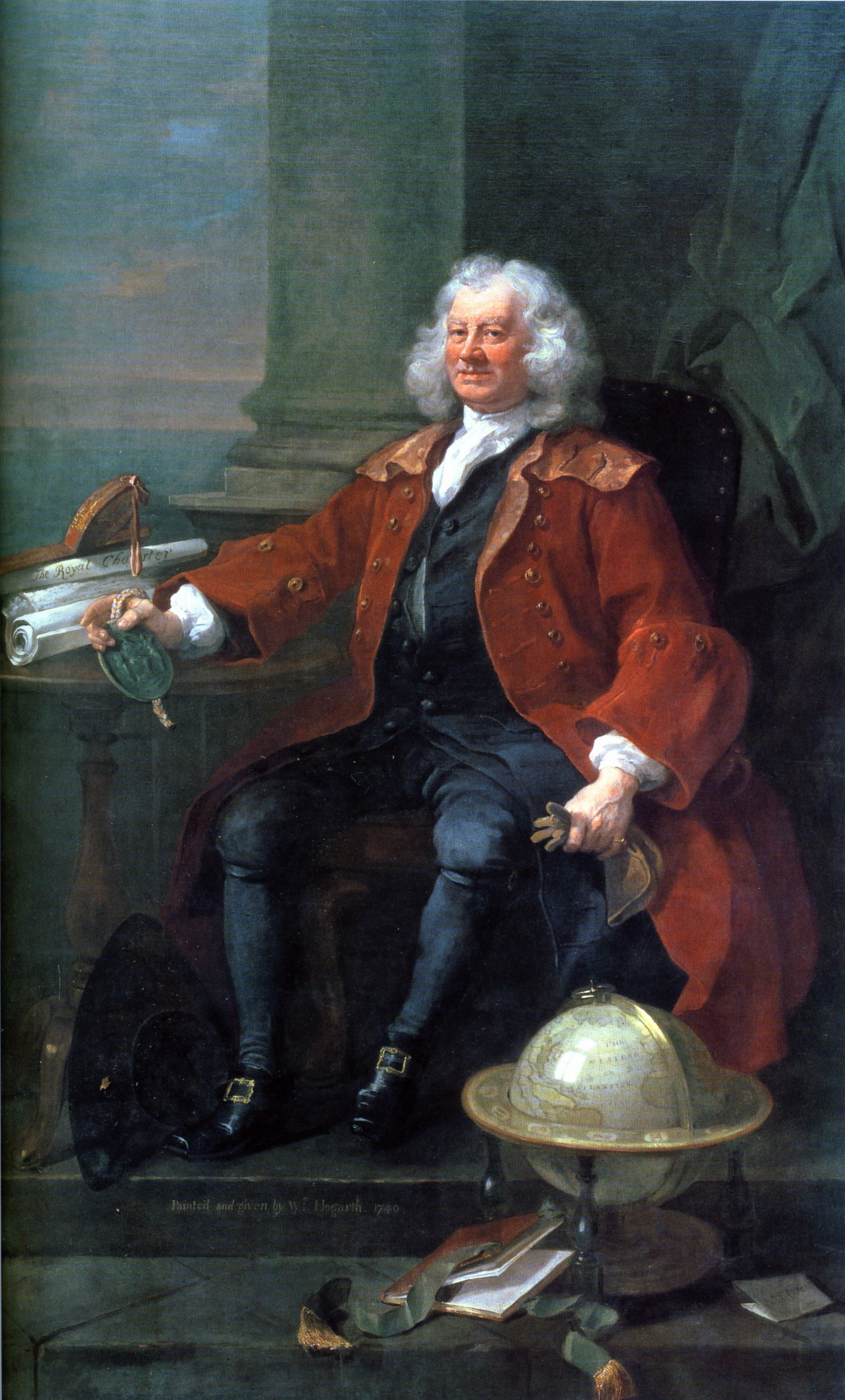
- Artist: William Hogarth
- Year: 1740
- Medium: Oil on canvas
- Dimensions: 239 cm × 147.5 cm (94 in × 58.1 in)
- Location: Foundling Museum, London

Portrait of Captain Thomas Coram is a 1740 portrait of philanthropist Thomas Coram painted by William Hogarth. The portrait, which represents Hogarth's highest achievement in direct portraiture, was not created as a commission and was instead donated to Coram's Foundling Hospital. The portrait is divided into two sections: the left side represents Coram's sea ventures, a major source of his wealth, while the right side shows a curtain pulled over a mother figure with a child.

The painting is now in the collection of London's Foundling Museum.

Edward Matthew Ward's 1863 painting Hogarth's Studio in 1739 features Hogarth's portrait of Coram. Coram's pose in the portrait was also used in the 1963 statue of Coram by William McMillan which stands by the Foundling Museum.

== See also ==
- List of works by William Hogarth
