= Before and After (Hogarth) =

Painting series by William Hogarth

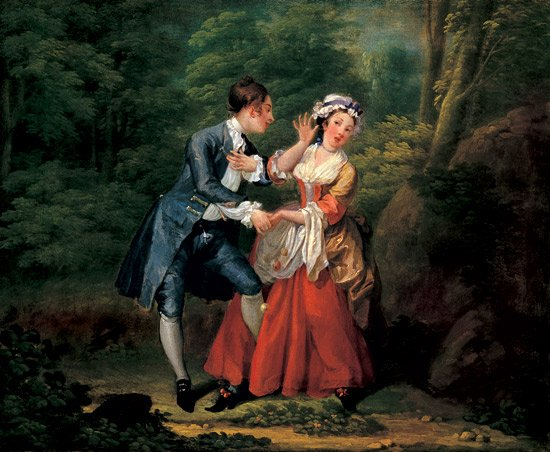
William Hogarth, Before (First Version), 1730-31, Fitzwilliam Museum

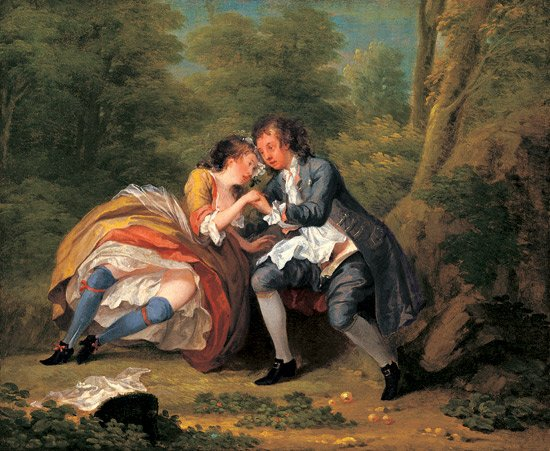
William Hogarth, After (First Version), 1730-1731

Before and After is a pair of comic paintings by British painter William Hogarth. He made two painted versions in 1730–31. The first version showed an exterior scene in a wooded glade, based on contemporary French pastoral fête galante, while a second version moved the scene indoors. Hogarth made engravings based on the second version in 1736. In each pair, based on the position and appearance of the subjects, the first painting shows the couple before and the second after sexual intercourse.

== First painted version ==
The first version, painted 1730–31, is at the Fitzwilliam Museum in Cambridge, bequeathed by the merchant banker Arnold John Hugh Smith in 1964. Each oil on canvas painting measures 37.2 cm × 45.1 cm (14.6 in × 17.8 in)

In Before, a young man in blue clothing is making ardent advances, while his coy lover dressed in red shies away. A number of details suggest what will happen next: apples are falling from her lap, his knee points suggestively towards her, and his trousers are bulging. In the accompanying After, their faces are flushed and their clothes disarrayed, revealing her thighs and his genitalia.

== Second painted version ==
The second painted versions, also painted 1730–31, are now held by the J. Paul Getty Museum, Los Angeles, acquired in 1978 from the estate of J. Paul Getty. The pair is in a more upright format: Before measures 40 cm × 33.7 cm (15.7 in × 13.3 in) and After measures 39.4 cm × 33.7 cm (15.5 in × 13.3 in).

In Before, a man in red breeches sits on a green-draped bed, lustily pulling a woman towards him. An open drawer in a dressing table reveals two books, "The Practice of Piety" at the front and hidden at the back a book on courtship and a love letter. She resists, holding onto the dressing table, while her small spaniel barks. In After, the couple are flushed: the man is pensively pulling up his breeches, while the woman clings to the man, her bonnet and skirts disarrayed. The dog sleeps on the floor beside the overturned dressing table, its mirror and books lying broken on the floor. The fallen books and mirror probably represent the loss of virtue and innocence.

The paintings are thought to have been commissioned by John Montagu, 2nd Duke of Montagu. The male protagonist was traditionally identified as John Willes, later Chief Justice of the Court of Common Pleas. They were made around the time Hogarth was working on his paintings of A Harlot's Progress.

== Engraving ==
Hogarth made engravings of Before and After in 1736, around the time as Hogarth was working on his painting Four Times of the Day, and engravings such as The Distrest Poet.

The engravings were based on the second version of the paintings, with some alterations and embellishments. The scenes are also set in a bedroom, with an older man in a wig pulling the young woman towards him, with a dog jumping up and furniture tumbling down. In the background, a picture on the wall shows a cherub is lighting the fuse of a rocket, while the mirror on the dressing table hides a second picture. The woman's resistance may be for the sake of appearances rather than a genuine attempt to escape, as she has already discarded her corset, which lies on a chair.

In the accompanying After, the figures' clothes are disarrayed. The woman clings to the man as he pulls up his breeches. The dog has gone to sleep amid the overturned furniture and broken mirror. On the floor is a book by Aristotle entitled Omne Animal Post Coitum Triste (every animal is sad after sex, a saying attributed to Galen). In the background, the hidden picture is now visible, revealing a cupid whose spent firework is returning to earth.

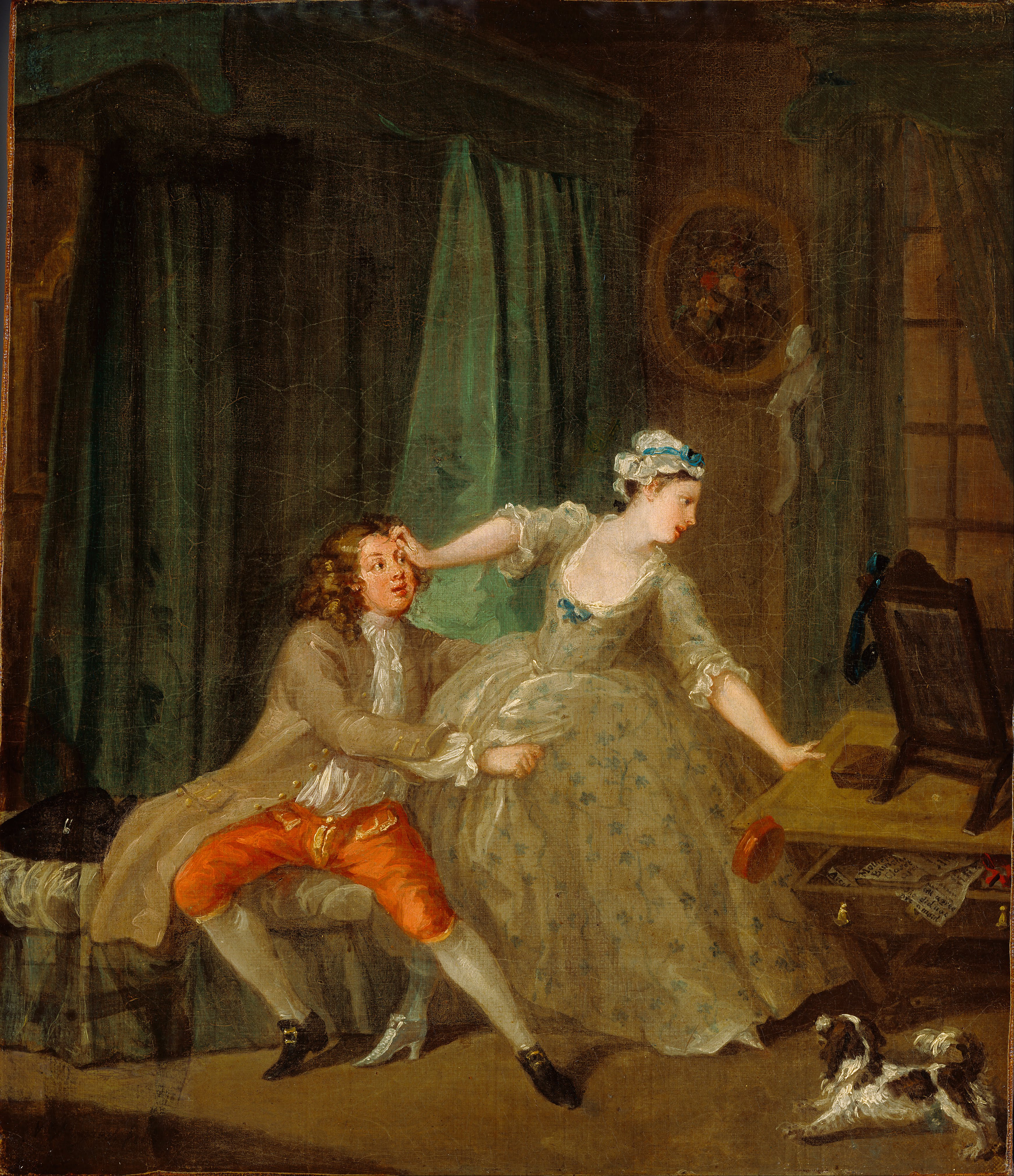
Before, Second Version

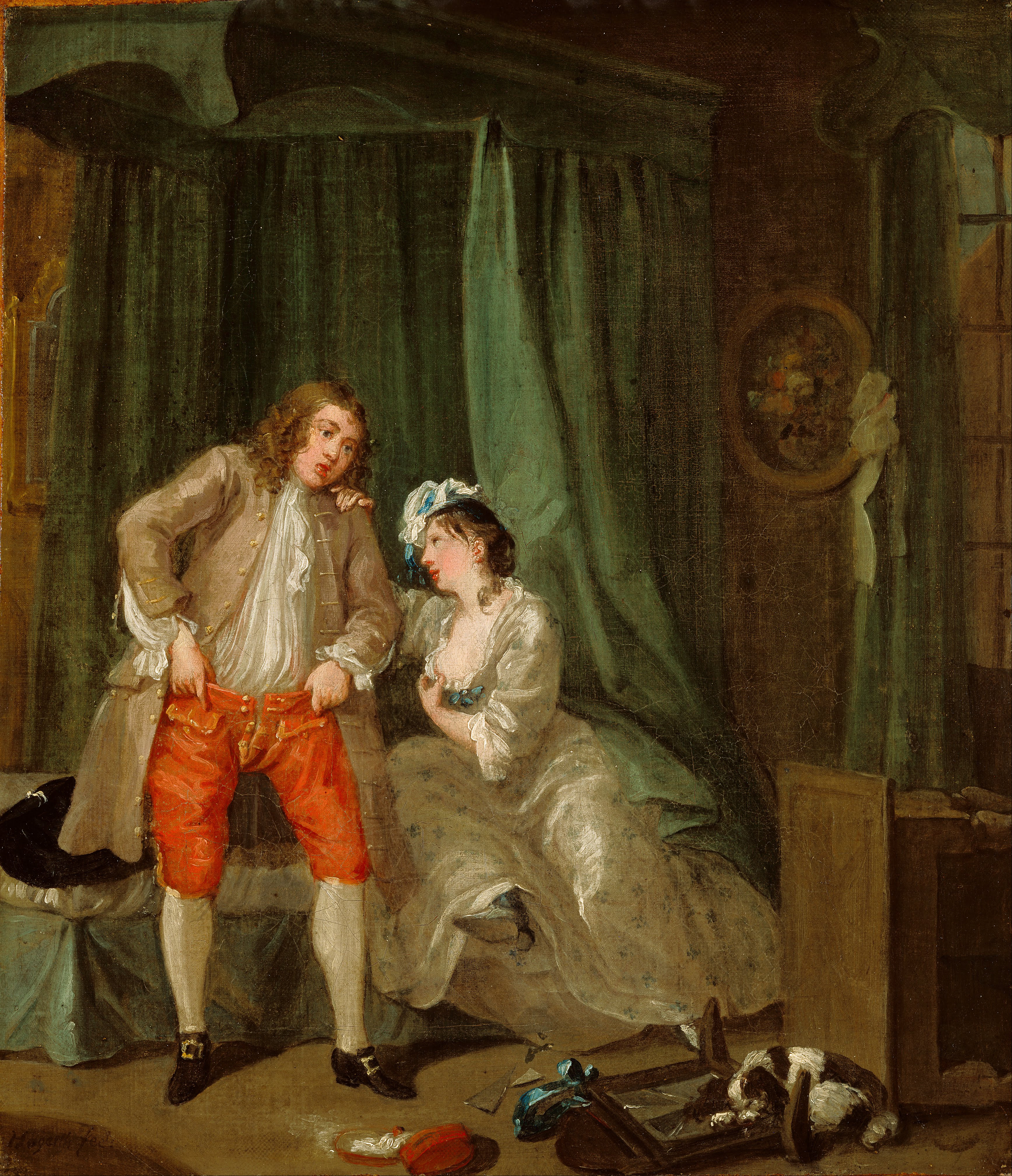
After, Second Version

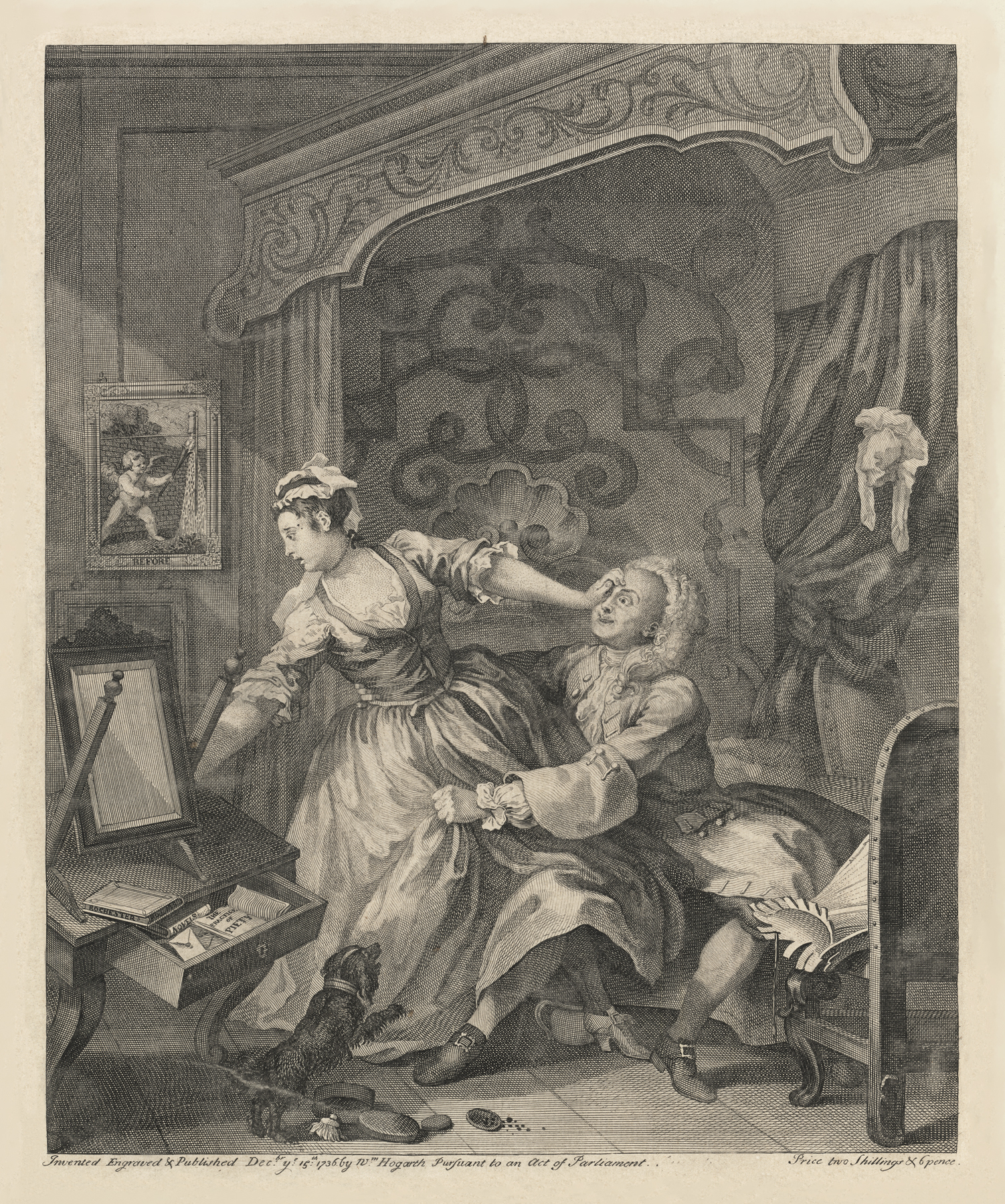
Engraving, Before

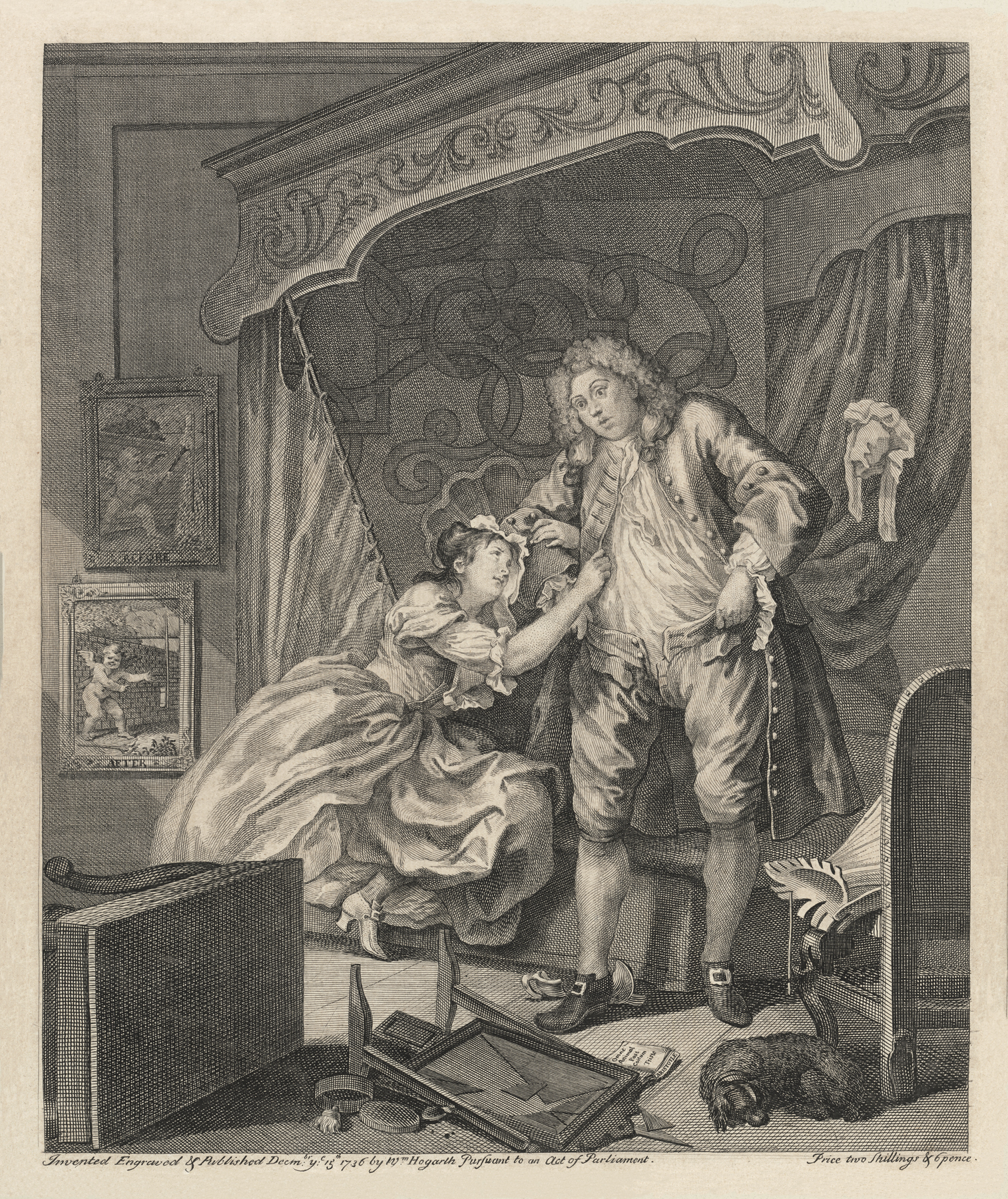
Engraving, After

== See also ==
- List of works by William Hogarth
