= Line of beauty =

S-shaped curved line, theory in art

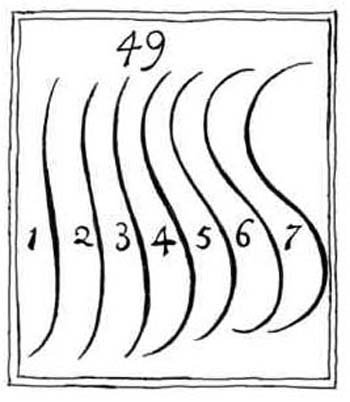
Serpentine lines from Hogarth's The Analysis of Beauty

Line of beauty is a term and a theory in art or aesthetics used to describe an S-shaped curved line (a serpentine line) appearing within an object, as the boundary line of an object, or as a virtual boundary line formed by the composition of several objects. This theory originated with William Hogarth (18th-century English painter, satirist, and writer), and is an essential part of Hogarth's theory of aesthetics as described in his 1753 book The Analysis of Beauty. According to this theory, S-shaped curved lines signify liveliness and activity and excite the attention of the viewer as contrasted with straight lines, parallel lines, or right-angled intersecting lines, which signify stasis, death, or inanimate objects.

In contrast to grand compositional lines, which are regularly found in Baroque or Rococo art, the serpentine line is not primarily dictating the whole composition of a canvas. Instead, the line should be understood as being found in specific subject matter, like the human figure. A composition is created by employing various kinds of lines in various relations to each other without destroying its simplicity.

== Gallery ==
Diagram S-curve form of Doryphoros by Polykleitos

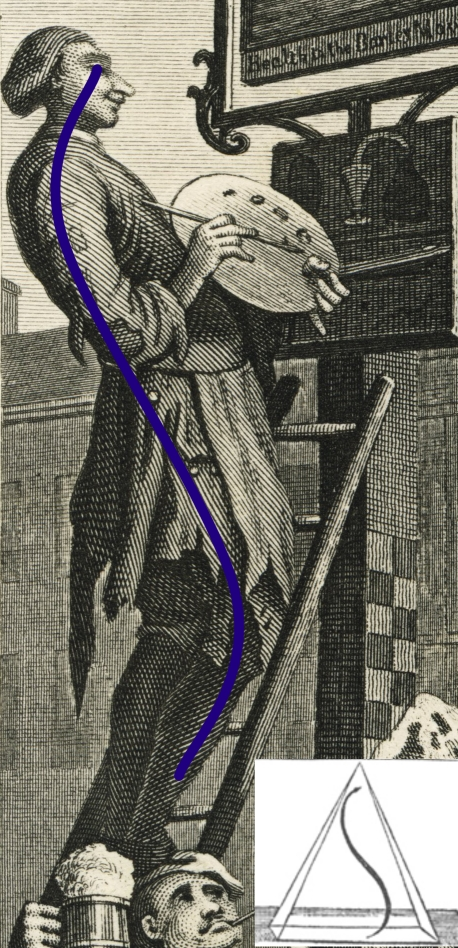
The line of beauty denoted on Hogarth's 1751 Beer Street sign painter.

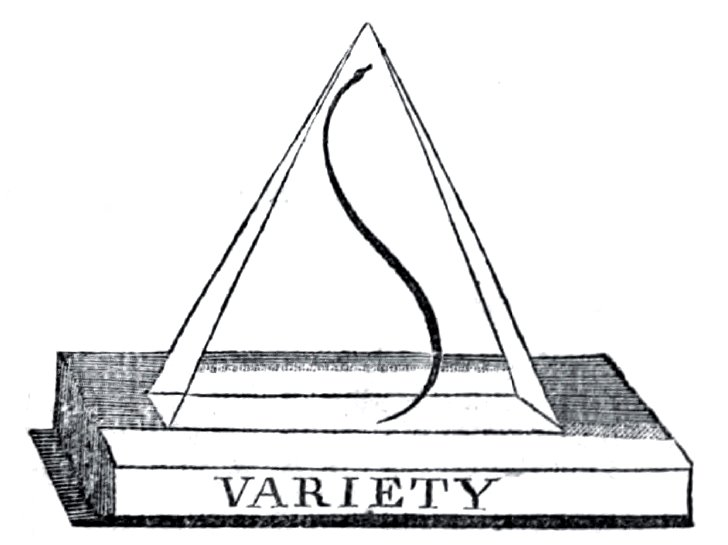
An illustration from the title page of The Analysis of Beauty.

== See also ==
- S-curve (art)
- Ogee
