= List of works by William Hogarth =

This is a list of works by William Hogarth by publication date (if known).

As a printmaker Hogarth often employed other engravers to produce his work and frequently revised his works between one print run and the next, so it is often difficult to accurately differentiate between works by (or for) Hogarth and those in the style of or "after". Some of the less likely, possible, doubtful works and those formerly identified as Hogarth's works are listed at the end. Numbers in square brackets refer to the catalogue numbers in Ronald Paulson's third edition of Hogarth's Graphic Works (those with asterisks are classified as "After Hogarth" by Paulson).

The works are all paintings, prints or drawings, apart from Hogarth's 1753 book The Analysis of Beauty.

== 1720s ==
- Tatton Coat of Arms (early) [1]
- Benefit ticket for Spiller (1720?) [2]
- Shop card (1720)—advertising Hogarth's own engraving shop [3]
- Shop card for Hardy (early) [4]
- Funeral ticket (c. 1721–36) [22]
- Shop card for Ellis Gamble (c.1723 or 1728) [23]
- Impression from a tankard belonging to the Clare Market Artists Club (early) [25]
- Kendal Arms (1723 or later) [26 (27)]
- Self-portrait with two figures and two cupids (1720)
- Emblematical Print on the South Sea Scheme / The South Sea Scheme (c.1721) [43]
- Fifteen illustrations for Aubrey De La Montraye's Travels (1723) [28–42]
- Seven small prints for Apuleius's Golden Ass (1724)
- The Lottery (1724) [53]
- The Mystery of Masonry brought to Light by ye Gormogons (1724) [55]
- The Bad Taste of the Town / The Taste of the Town / Masquerades and Operas (1724) - Hogarth's first attempt to publish his own satirical print, an attempt frustrated by the printmakers' monopoly [44]
- Seven illustrations for Gildon's New Metamorphosis (1723) [45–51]
- A Just View of the British Stage (1724) [57]
- Royalty, Episcopacy, and Law / Some of the Principal Inhabitants of the Moon (c.1724–25) [56]
- Five illustrations for La Calprenede's Cassandra (1725) [58–62]
- A Burlesque on Kent's Altarpiece at St. Clement Danes (1725) [63]
- Two illustrations for Milton's Paradise Lost (1725) [64–65]
- Fourteen illustrations for Beaver's Roman Military Punishments (1725) [66–79]
- Sign for a Paviour (c.1725)
- The Carpenter's Yard (c.1725)
- The Doctor's Visit (c.1725)
- Seventeen Small Illustrations for Samuel Butler's Hudibras (1726)—engraved in 1721 they were published alongside the twelve large illustration in the 1726 edition [5–21]

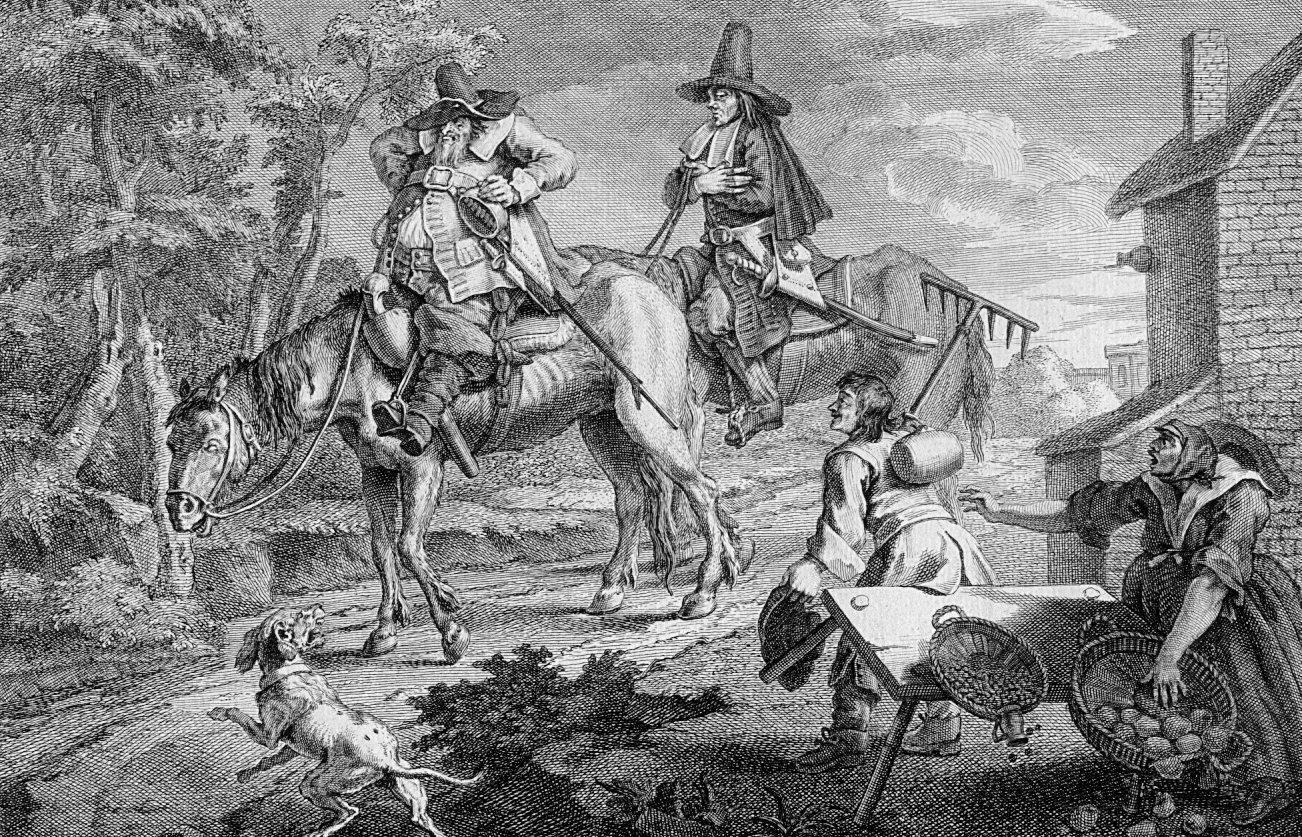
Hudibras Sallying Forth, one of 12 illustrations for the 1726 edition.

- Twelve illustrations for Samuel Butler's Hudibras (1726) [82–93]
- Sancho's Feast (possibly before the illustrations of Don Quixote, probably before 1733) [100]
- Six illustrations for Cervantes’ Don Quixote (c.1726) [94–99]
- Frontispiece for Terrae-Filius (1726) [101]
- Twenty-six figures (on two plates) for Blackwell's Compendium of Military Discipline (1726) [102,103]
- Letterhead for Blundell's School, Tiverton (1726) [104]
- Cunicularii / The Wise Men of Godliman in Consultation (1726) - a satire on the "learned" doctors taken in by Mary Toft, a subject revisited in Credulity, Superstition, and Fanaticism [106]
- The Punishment Inflicted on Lemuel Gulliver (1726) [107]
- A Garret Scene (c.1726)
- Shop card for Mrs. Holt's Italian Warehouse (unknown) [106]
- His Royal Highness George, Prince of Wales (before 1727) [54]
- Masquerade Ticket (1727) [108]
- Frontispiece to Leveridge's Collection of Songs [110]
- Frontispiece to Cooke's Hesiod (1727) [111]
- The Carpenter's Yard (1727?)
- Music Introduced To Apollo By Minerva (1727?) [109]
- Benefit ticket for Milward (1728) [112]
- Henry the Eighth and Anne Boleyn (1728–29) [113]
- The Great Seal of England (1728–29) [114]
- Two illustrations for Theobald's Perseus and Andromeda (1729) [115,116]

== 1730s ==
- Shop card for Mary and Ann Hogarth (1730) [117]
- Bookplate for George Lambert (1730?) [118]
- Paulet book plate (unknown) [119]
- The Beggar's Opera (various versions between 1728 and 1731, all showing a scene from Act III; Scene xi)
  - The Beggar's Opera I (c.1728)
  - The Beggar's Opera II (1728)
  - The Beggar's Opera III
  - The Beggar's Opera IV (c.1728)
  - The Beggar's Opera V
  - The Beggar's Opera VI (1729–31)
- An Assembly at Wanstead House (1728–31)
- The Denunciation (1729)
- Woodes Rogers and his Family (1729)
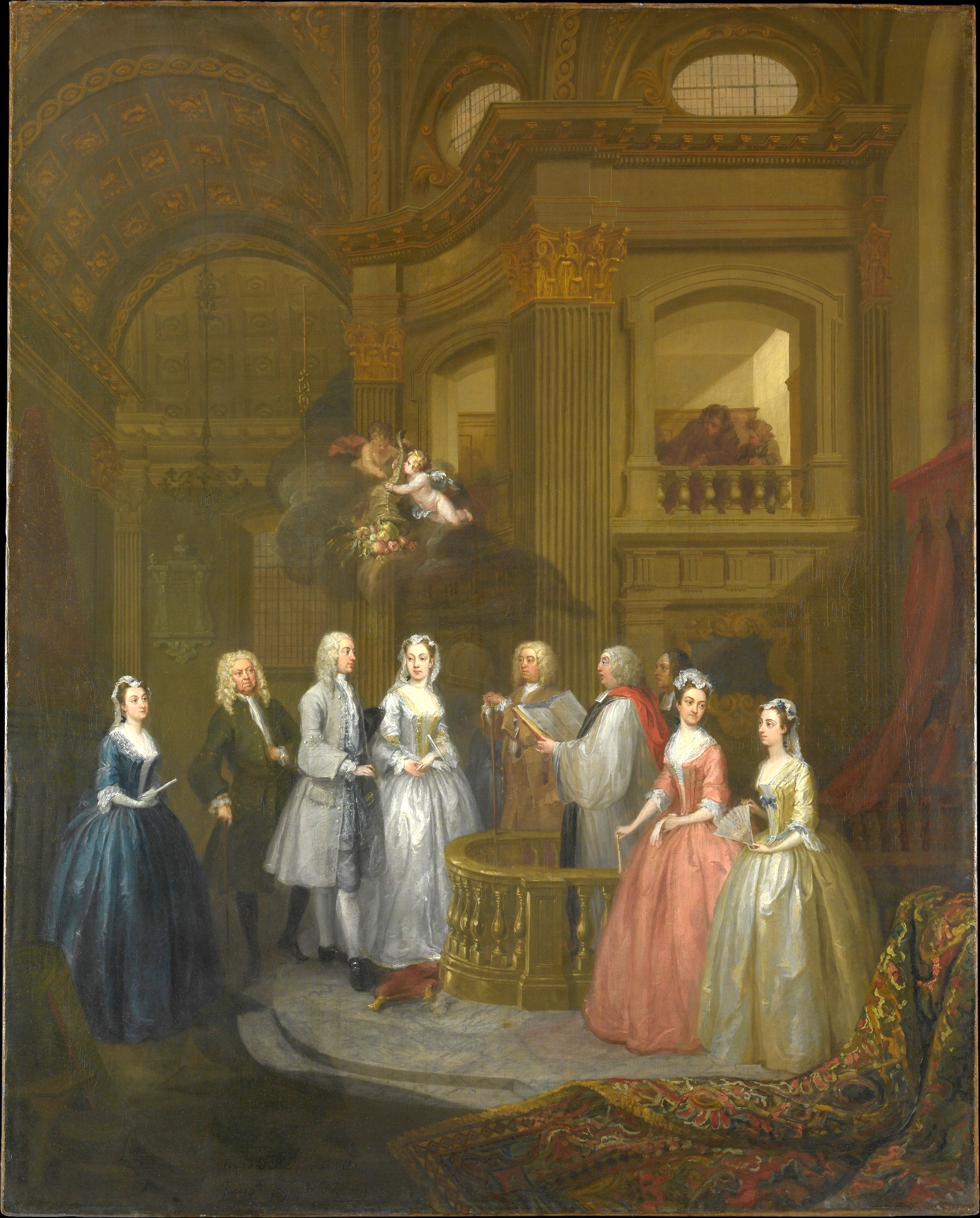
  The Wedding of Stephen Bechingham and Mary Cox (1729)
- The Wedding of Stephen Bechingham and Mary Cox (1729–30)
- Bambridge on Trial for Murder by a Committee of the House of Commons / The Committee of the House of Commons (1729)
- The Christening / Orator Henley Christening A Child (c.1729)
- Debates on Palmistry (c.1729)
- Falstaff Examining His Recruits (1730)—the oldest known painting of a scene from Shakespeare
- The Wollaston Family (1730)
- The House of Cards (1730)—two scenes of children playing sometimes paired.
  - The House of Cards
  - A Children's Party
- The Ashley and Popple Family (1730)
- Boys Peeping at Nature (1730)—subscription ticket for A Harlot's Progress, modified and reused as subscription ticket for Paul Before Felix and Moses Brought Before Pharaoh's Daughter in 1751 [120]
- The Jones Family (c. 1730)
- An Auction of Pictures (c.1730)
- A Fishing Party / A Fair Angler (c.1730)
- Conversation Piece (Portrait of Sir Andrew Fountaine with Other Men and Women) / The Fountaine Family (c.1730-1735)
- A Scene from "The Tempest" (c.1730–1735)
- Before and After—a comic view of the differing attitudes of men and women to love making. Various versions:
  - Before and After oil-on-canvas, exterior scene (1730–31)
  - Before and After oil-on-canvas, interior scene (1730–31)
  - Before and After engraving, interior scene (1736) [141,142]
- Ashley Cowper with his Wife and Daughter (1731)
- The Theft of a Watch (1731)
- The Family of George II The Royal Family (1731–32)
- The Royal Family II (1732–33)
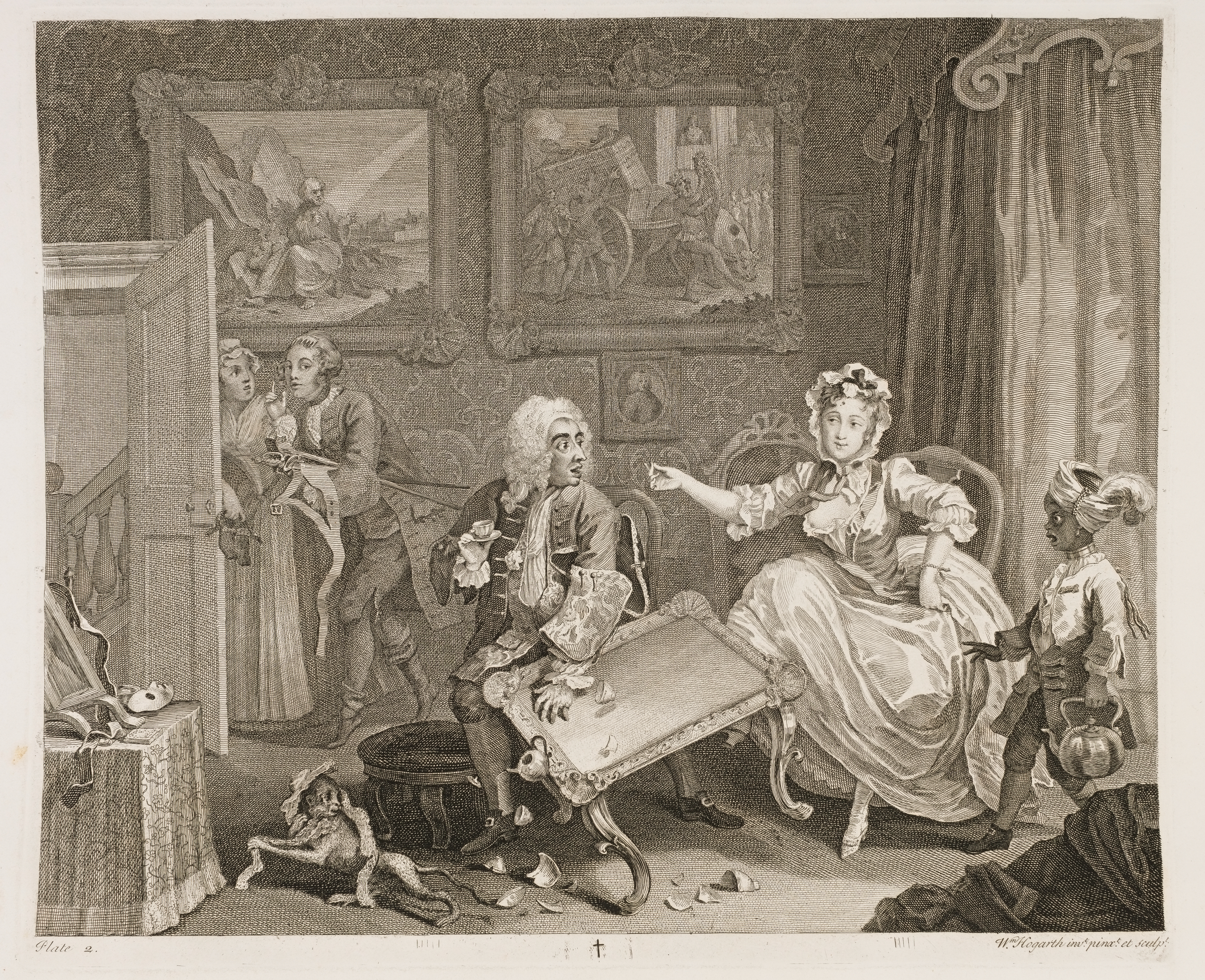
  Plate 2 of A Harlot's Progress
- A Harlot's Progress (1732)—six pictures showing the path of a pretty country girl lured into a life of prostitution [121–126]
  - Plate 1 (Ensnared by a Procuress)
  - Plate 2 (Quarrels with her Jew Protector)
  - Plate 3 (Apprehended by a Magistrate)
  - Plate 4 (Scene in Bridewell)
  - Plate 5 (Expires while the Doctors are Disputing)
  - Plate 6 (The Funeral)
- A Chorus of Singers / The Chorus / Rehearsal of the Oratorio of Judith—subscription ticket for Midnight Modern Conversation (1732) [127]
- A Midnight Modern Conversation painting and print (1732) [128]
- The Cholmondeley Family (1732)
- A Performance of "The Indian Emperor or The Conquest of Mexico by the Spaniards" (1732-1735)
- Sarah Malcolm / Sarah Malcolm in Prison (1732) [129]
- H.R.H. William Augustus, Duke of Cumberland (c.1732)
- The Marriage Contract (c.1732)—a study for A Rake's Progress this was likely to have been intended as the second scene
- Gerard Anne Edwards in His Cradle (1733)
- A Laughing Audience / A Pleased Audience (1733) — subscription ticket for A Rake's Progress [130]
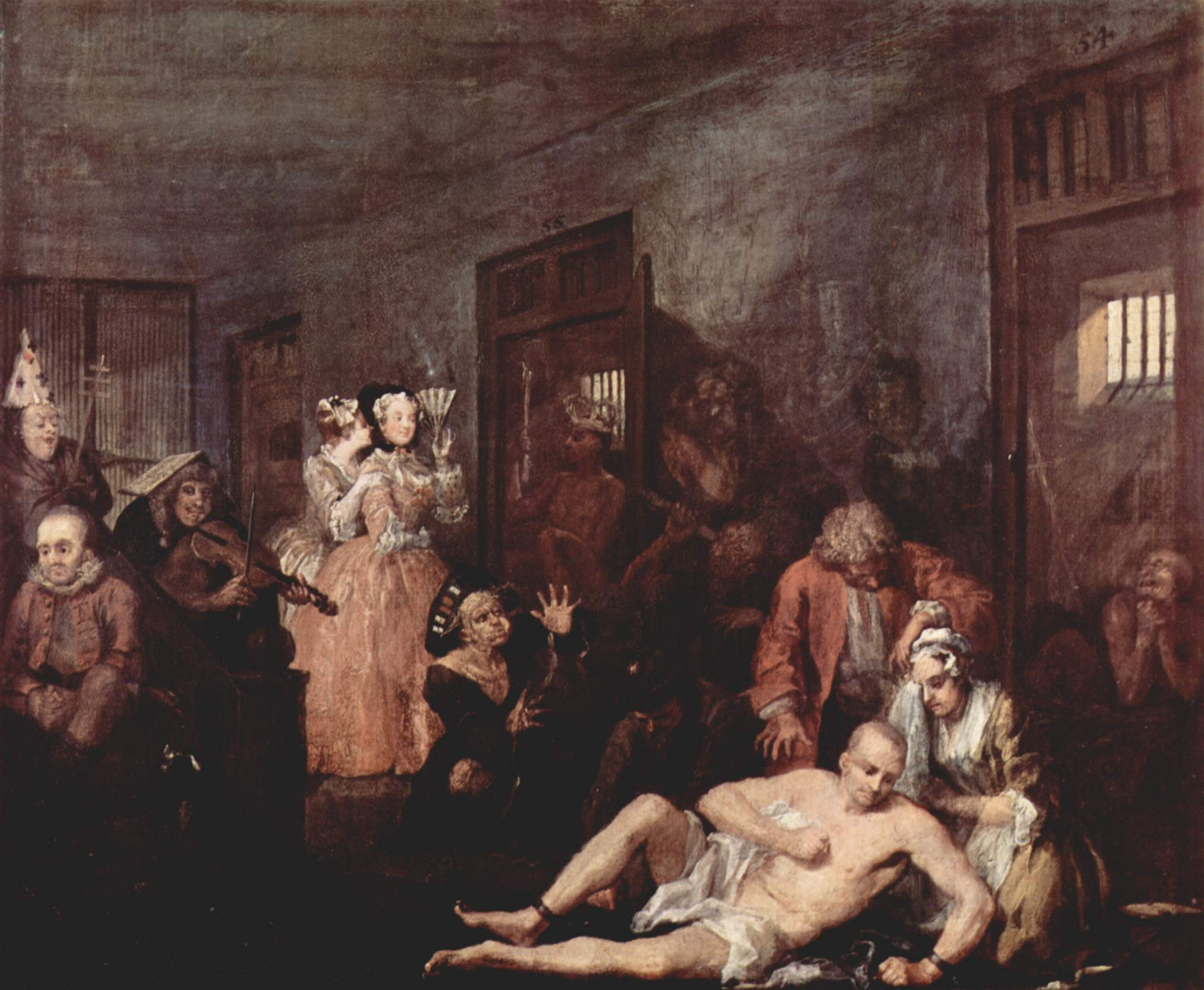
  The Madhouse, the final scene from A Rake's Progress
- A Rake's Progress: paintings (1732–33); prints (1735) — a series of eight scenes depicting the dissolute life of a young heir and his descent into poverty and madness [132–139]
  - The Heir
  - The Levee
  - The Orgy
  - The Arrest
  - The Marriage
  - The Gaming House
  - The Prison
  - The Madhouse
- Southwark Fair (1733)—issued with A Rake's Progress [131]
- The Edwards Family (1733–34)
- The Distrest Poet (c.1733-36) painting (1737) print—issued with Scholars at a Lecture and The Company of Undertakers (1740) print—issued together with The Enraged Musician [145]
- The Pool of Bethesda (c.1735)
- Satan, Sin and Death (1735–40)
- Self Portrait (c.1735-40)
- Thomas Pellett, M.D. (c. 1735-39)
- The Sleeping Congregation painting (1728) print (1736) [140]
- Scholars at a Lecture (1736) [143]
- The Company of Undertakers (1736) [144]
- Three Ladies in a Grand Interior/ The Broken Fan / possibly Catherine Darnley, Duchess of Buckingham with Two Ladies (c.1736)
- Woman Swearing A Child To A Grave Citizen—print engraved by Joseph Symons c. 1736
- The Good Samaritan (1737)
- Four Times of the Day paintings (1736) prints (1738)—four comic views of life in London [146–149]
  - Morning
  - Noon
  - Evening
  - Night
- Strolling Actresses Dressing in a Barn (1738)—issued with Four Times of the Day, the original painting was destroyed in a fire in 1874 [150]
- Benjamin Hoadly, Bishop of Winchester (1738)—a later portrait was produced in 1741
- The Strode Family (c.1738-42)
- The Western Family (1738)
- George Arnold (c.1738-1740)
- Francis Arnold (c.1738-1740)
- James Quin, Actor (1739)
- Charity in the Cellar (c.1739)

== 1740s ==
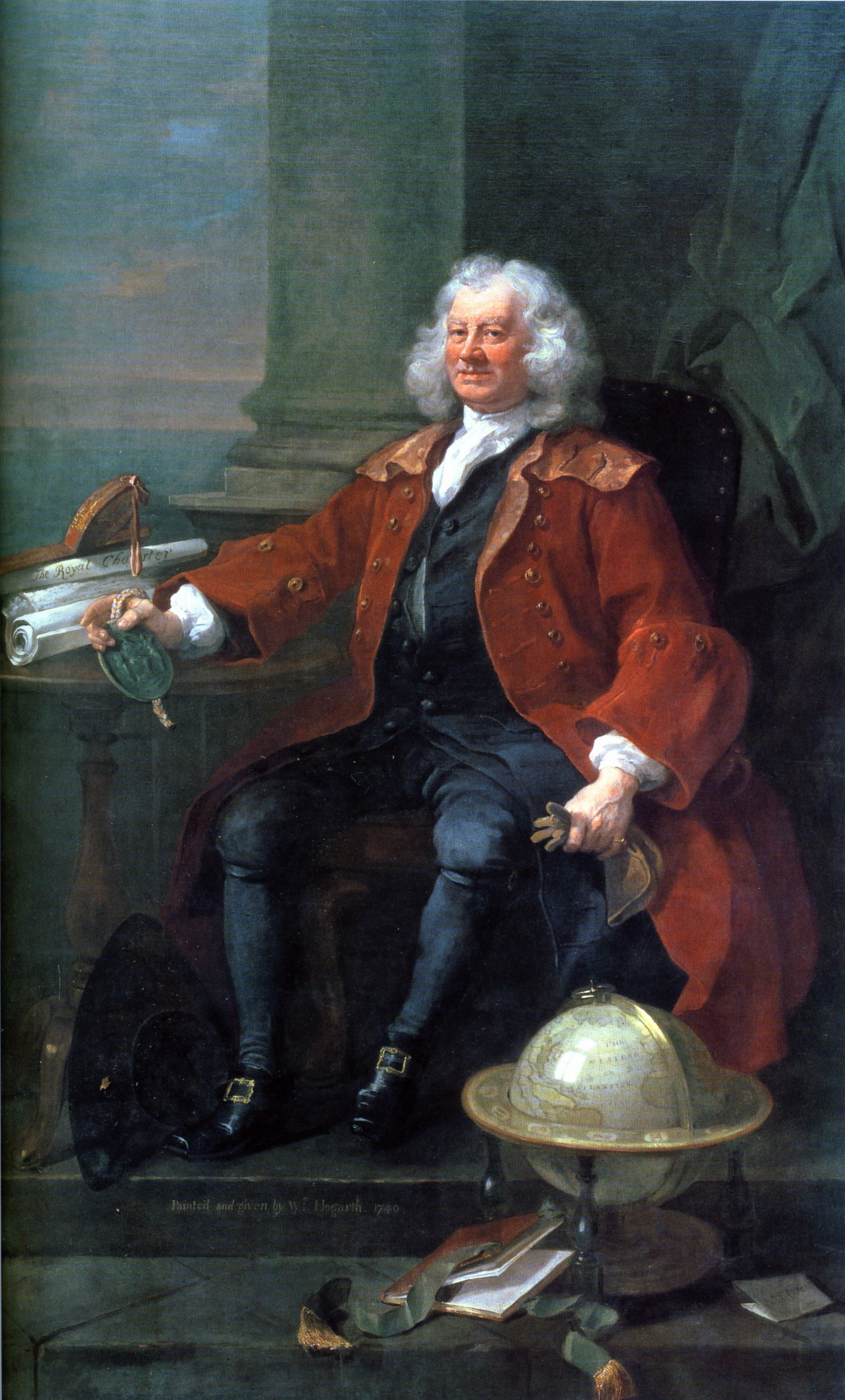
Captain Thomas Coram (1740)

- Hymen and Cupid (1740) [151]
- Captain Thomas Coram (1740)
- William Jones (1740)
- Lord Grey and Lady Mary West as Children (1740)
- Ticket for Tiverton (Blundell's) School Feast (1740)
- Head of a Lady, called Lady Pembroke (c.1740)
- The Hervey Conversation Piece / Lord Hervey and His Friends (c.1740)
- The Shrimp Girl (c.1740–45)—unfinished
- Lavinia Fenton, Duchess of Bolton (c. 1740–50)
- Mrs Salter (1741 or 1744)
- Benjamin Hoadly, Bishop of Winchester (1741)
- William Cavendish, Marquess of Hartington, Later 4th Duke of Devonshire (1741)
- The Enraged Musician (1741) [152]
- The Charmers of the Age (1741) [153]
- Taste in High Life (c.1742)
- Martin Folkes (1742) [154]
- The Graham Children (1742)
- The Mackinen Children (1742–43)
- Miss Mary Edwards (1742)
- Characters and Caricaturas (1743)—subscription ticket for Marriage à-la-mode [156]

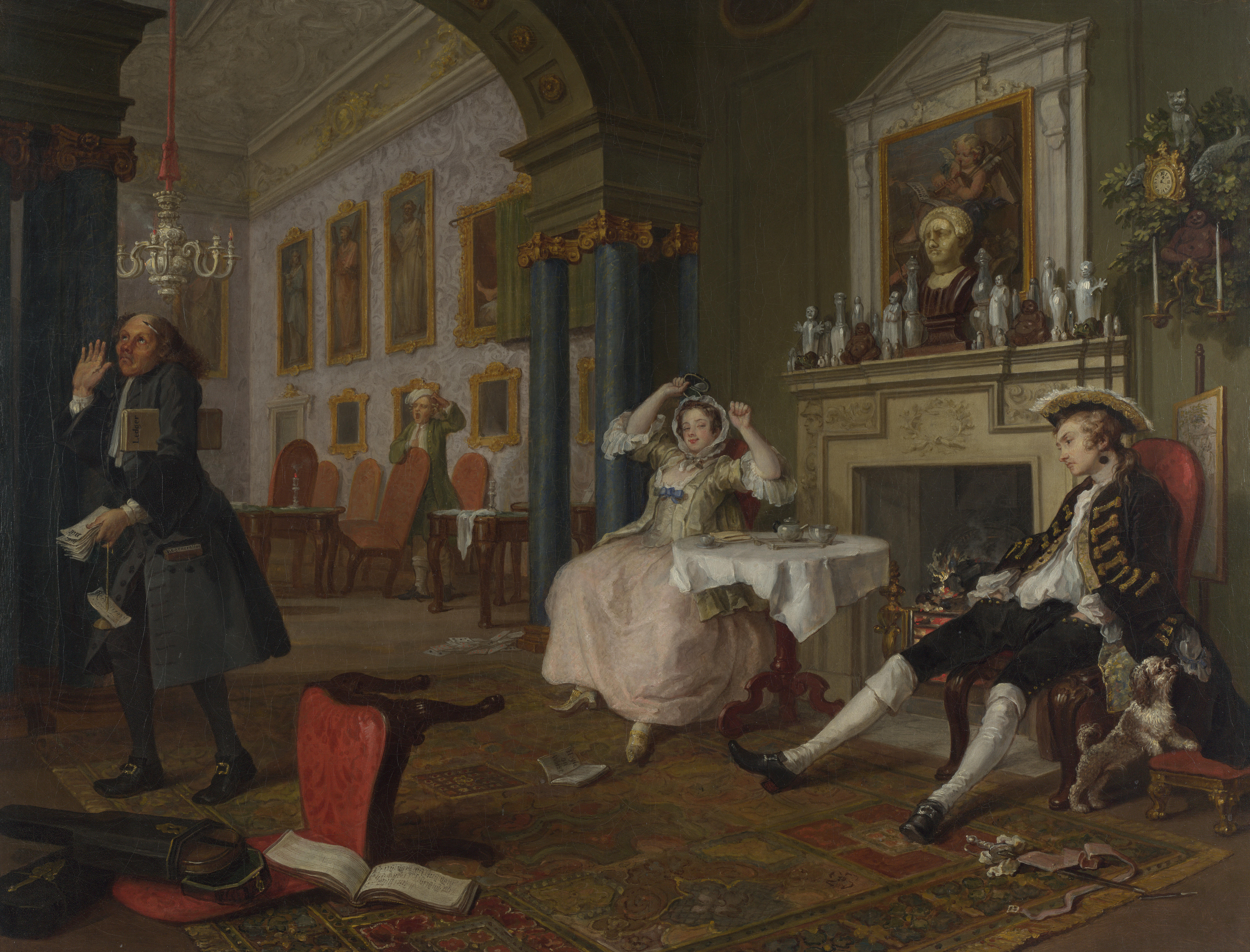
The second scene from Marriage à-la-mode

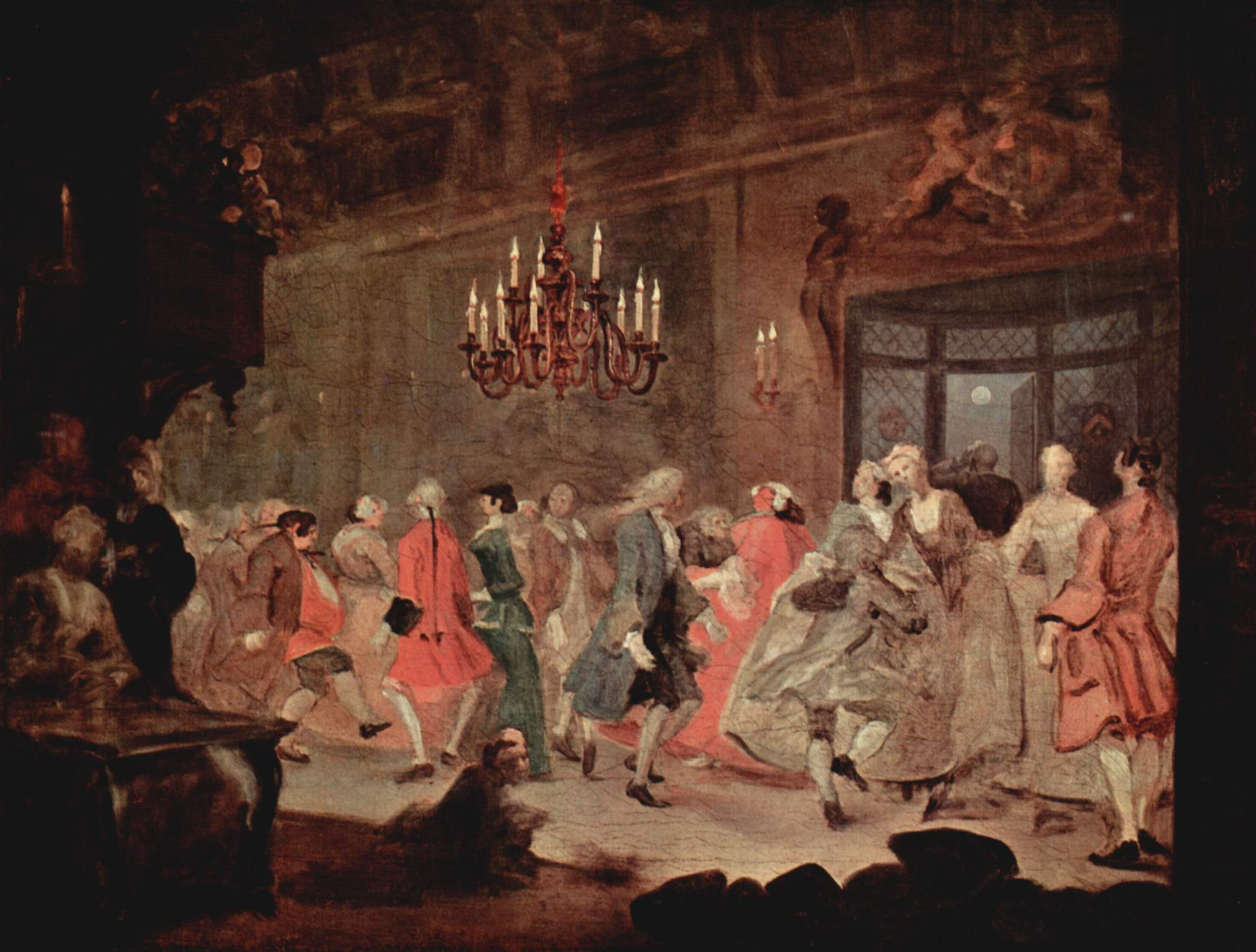
The Dance / The Happy Marriage VI: The Country Dance (c.1745). This scene was used to illustrate The Analysis of Beauty.

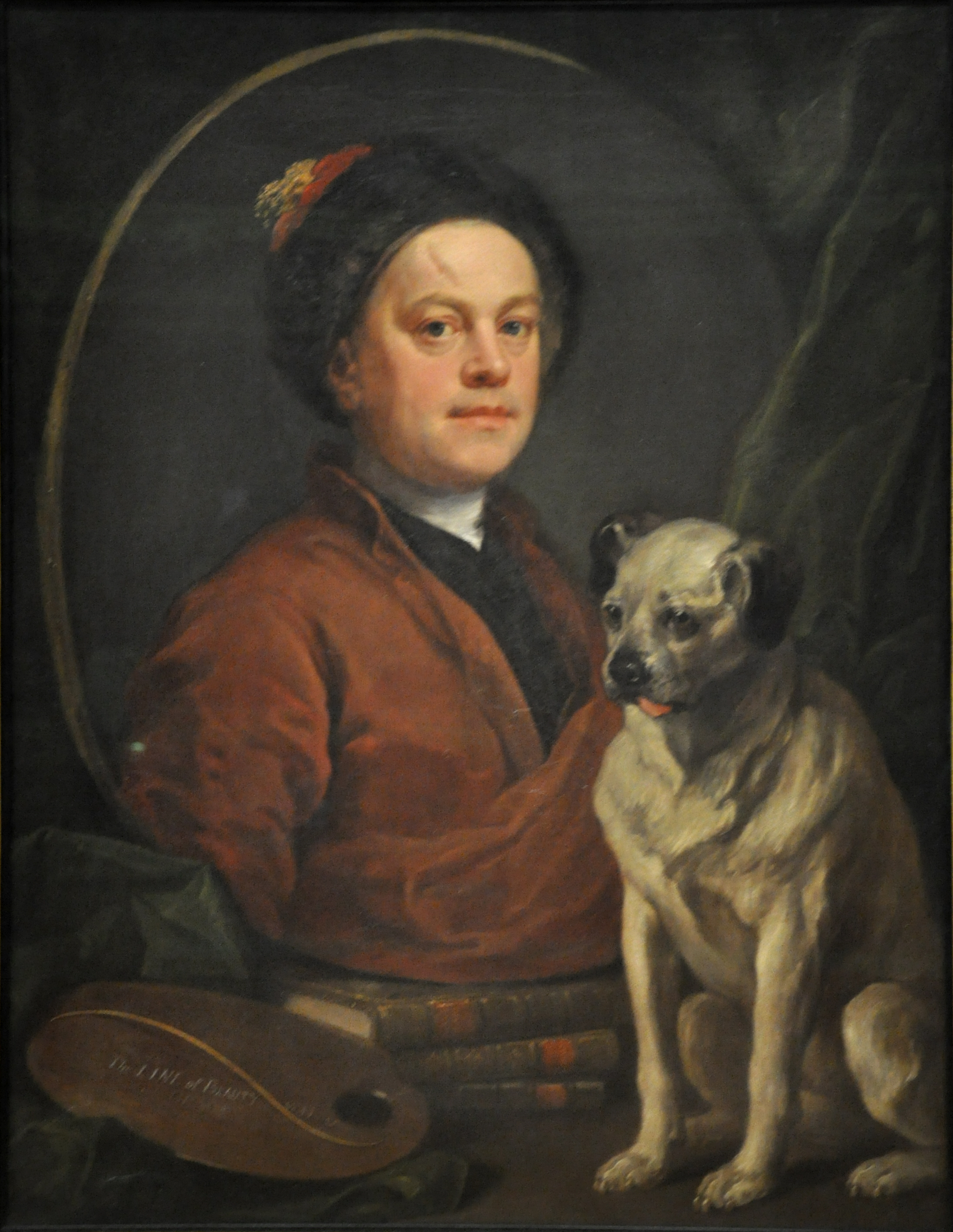
Painter and his Pug, 1745 self-portrait with his dog, Trump

- Marriage à-la-mode paintings (1743–45) prints (1743)—six satirical pictures commenting on fashionable society. Commonly considered Hogarth's masterwork [158–163]
  - The Marriage Settlement / The Marriage Contract
  - The Tête à Tête / Shortly After the Marriage
  - The Inspection / Visit to the Quack Doctor
  - The Toilette / The Duchess' Morning Levee
  - The Bagnio / The Death of the Earl
  - The Lady's Death / The Suicide of the Duchess
- The Discovery (c.1743?) [155]
- The Battle of the Pictures (1744)—subscription ticket for an auction of Hogarth's works [157]
- Thomas Herring, Archbishop of Canterbury (1744–47)
- John Huggins (before 1745)
- Captain Lord George Graham in his Cabin (c.1745)
- Mary Blackwood, Mrs Desaguliers (c.1745)
- The Happy Marriage—Hogarth planned a series with this title but never finished it, and it is uncertain as to which pictures were intended for the series but the two below are most likely. A plate of The Stay-Maker is claimed to have been produced
  - The Stay-Maker / The Happy Marriage V: The Fitting of the Ball Gown (c.1745)
  - The Dance / The Happy Marriage VI: The Country Dance (c.1745)
- The Painter and his Pug / Self-Portrait with Pug-Dog / Gulielmus Hogarth painting (1745) print (1748) [181]
- Mask and Palette (1745)—subscription ticket for David Garrick in the Character of Richard III [164]
- David Garrick in the Character of Richard III painting (1745) print (1746) [165]
- Simon Lord Lovat (1746) [166]
- The Stage-Coach, Or The Country Inn Yard (1747) [167]
- Industry and Idleness (1747)—a series of twelve pictures showing the divergent courses of the lives of two apprentices. The industrious apprentice becomes Lord Mayor of London while the idle apprentice ends his life at the gallows. [168–179]
  - The Fellow 'Prentices at their Looms
  - The Industrious 'Prentice performing the Duty of a Christian
  - The Idle 'Prentice at Play in the Church Yard, during Divine Service
  - The Industrious 'Prentice a Favourite, and entrusted by his Master
  - The Idle 'Prentice turn'd away, and sent to Sea
  - The Industrious 'Prentice out of his Time, & Married to his Master's Daughter
  - The Idle 'Prentice return'd from Sea, & in a Garret with common Prostitute
  - The Industrious 'Prentice grown rich, & Sheriff of London
  - The Idle 'Prentice betrayed (by his Whore), & taken in a Night-Cellar with his Accomplice
  - The Industrious 'Prentice Alderman of London, the Idle one brought before him & Impreach'd by his Accomplice
  - The Idle 'Prentice Executed at Tyburn
  - The Industrious 'Prentice Lord-Mayor of London
- The Gate of Calais / O the Roast Beef of Old England painting (1748) print (1749)—a comic view of the French inspired by Hogarth's arrest as a spy in Calais [180]
- Portrait of George Osborne, later John Ranby Jnr (c.1748–50)
- Portrait of Hannah, Daughter of John Ranby Snr (c.1748–50)

== 1750s ==
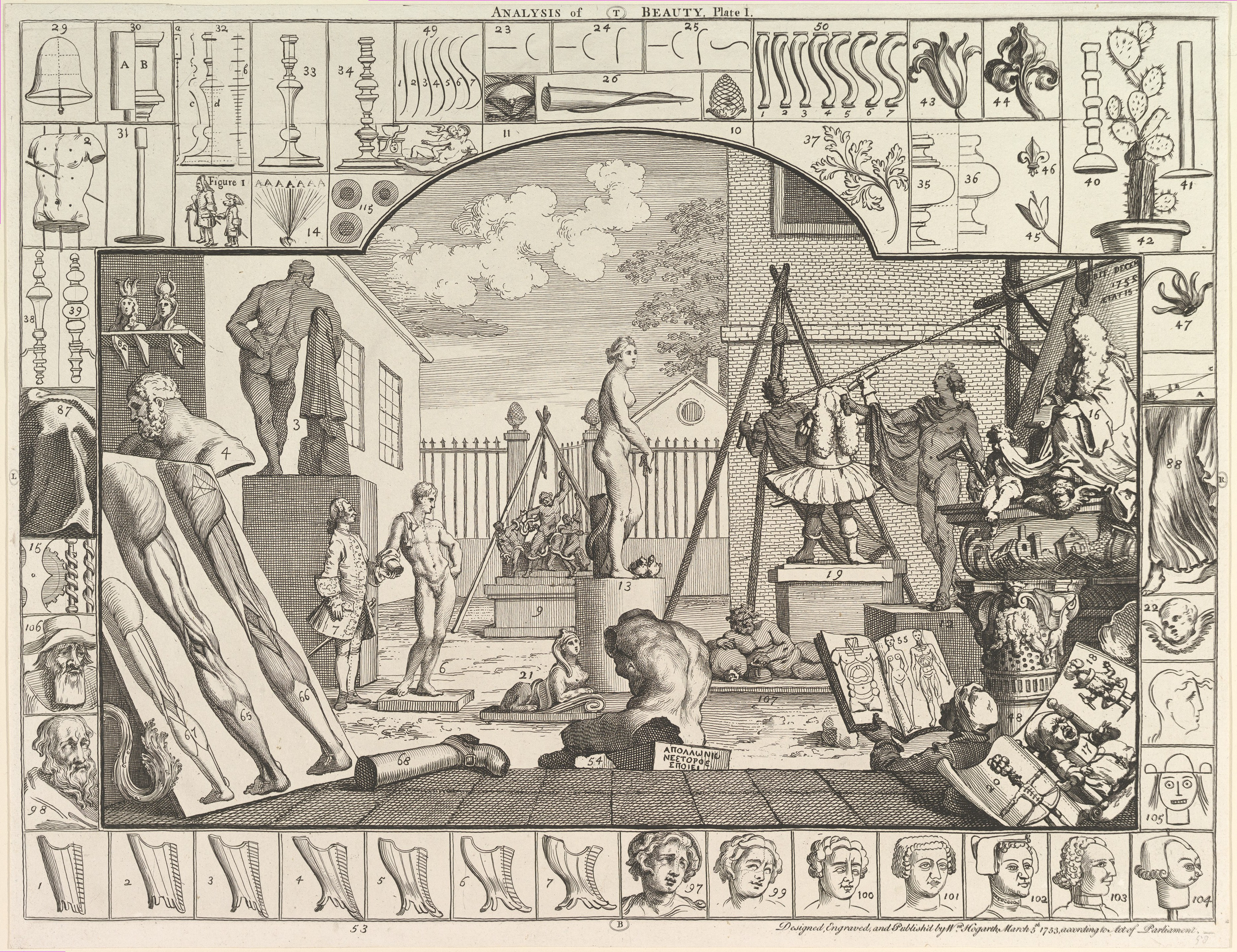
The Analysis of Beauty plate 1 (1753)

- View of Ranby's House (1750s?) [182]
- View of David Loudon's Bun House at Chelsey (1750)
- Designs for the tombstone of George Taylor (c.1750)
  - George Taylor Triumphing over Death
  - Death Giving George Taylor a Cross-Buttock
- A Stand of Arms, Musical Instruments, etc. (1750)—subscription ticket for The March of the Guards to Finchley [183]
- The March of the Guards to Finchley / The March to Finchley (1750) [184]
- Hogarth's Servants / Heads of Six of Hogarth's Servants (c. 1750-5)
- Beer Street and Gin Lane (1751)—a stark illustration of the relative merits of beer and gin [185,186]
- The Four Stages of Cruelty (1751)—four prints issued in response to the barbaric practices Hogarth witnessed in the streets of London [187–190]

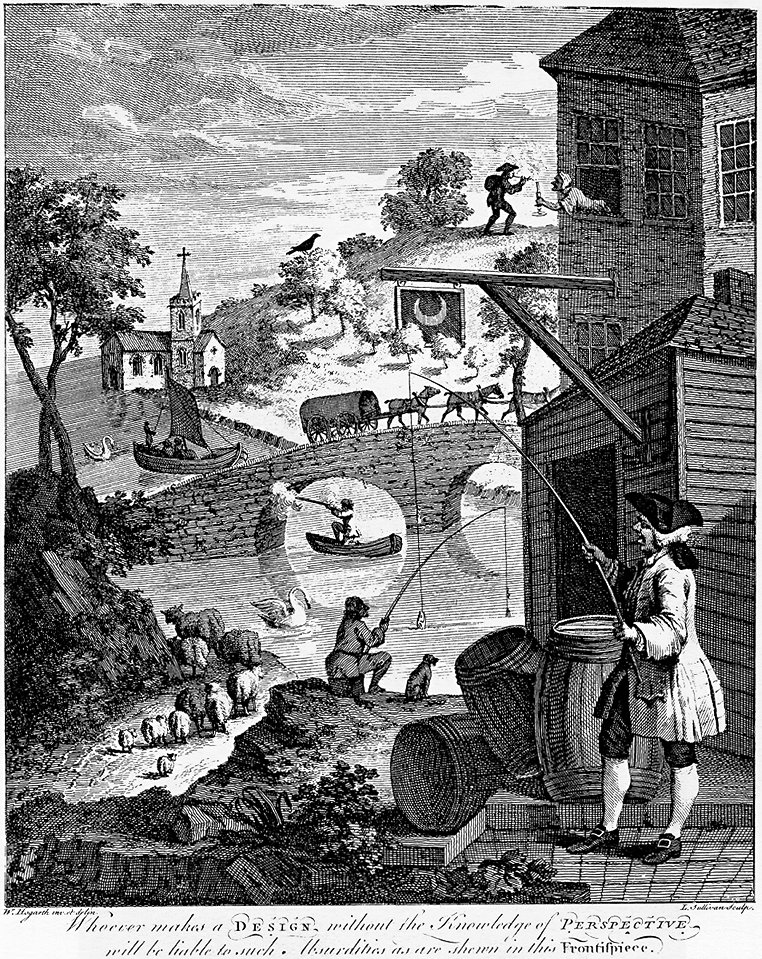
Satire on False Perspective (1754)

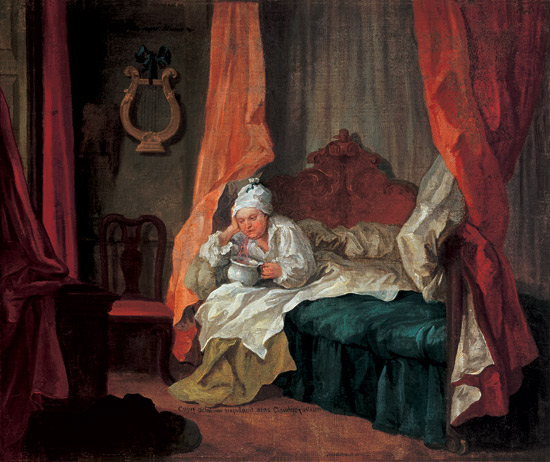
Francis Matthew Schutz in his bed; the third cousin to Frederick, Prince of Wales is shown vomiting into a chamber pot whilst lying in bed with a hangover. A painting allegedly commissioned by Schutz's wife to make her husband mend his ways.

  - The First Stage of Cruelty
  - The Second Stage of Cruelty
  - The Third Stage of Cruelty
  - The Forth Stage of Cruelty
- Paul Before Felix Burlesqued (1751)—subscription ticket for Paul Before Felix and Moses Brought Before Pharaoh's Daughter [191]
- Paul Before Felix (1752) [192]
- Moses Brought Before Pharaoh's Daughter (1752) [193]
- Columbus Breaking the Egg (1752)—subscription ticket of The Analysis of Beauty [194]
- The Analysis of Beauty—Book (1753)
- Satire on False Perspective (1754) [232*]
- Crowns, Mitres and Maces—subscription ticket for Four Prints of an Election paintings (1754) prints (1755) [197]
- Four Prints of an Election / Humours of an Election / An Election Series (1755)—a wry look at election practices [198–201]
  - An Election Entertainment
  - Canvassing for Votes
  - The Polling
  - Chairing the Member
- Francis Matthew Schutz in his Bed (c.1755-60)—the original which showed Schutz vomiting into a bowl was eventually overpainted to show him reading a book
- John Pine (c.1755)
- The Altarpiece of St Mary Redcliffe (1756)
- The Invasion; or France and England (1756) [202,203]
  - Plate 1: France
  - Plate 2: England
- Boy in a Green Coat (1756)
- David Garrick with His Wife Eva-Maria Veigel "La Violette" or "Violette" (1757)
- Inigo Jones (1757–58)
- Hogarth Painting the Comic Muse painting (c.1757) print (1758)—self-portrait [204]
- The Bench [205]
  - First state (1758)
  - Second state (unfinished) (1764)—issued posthumously.
- The Lady's Last Stake / Picquet or Virtue in Danger (1758–59)
- Sigismunda mourning over the Heart of Guiscardo (1758–59)
- The Cockpit (1759) [206]
- Bookplate of the Arms of John Holland (1759–61) [207]
- James Caulfield, 1st Earl of Charlemont (c.1759)
- Frontispiece and illustration for Tristram Shandy (1759–61) [204—41*]
- Sir Francis Dashwood at his Devotions (late 1750s)

== 1760s ==
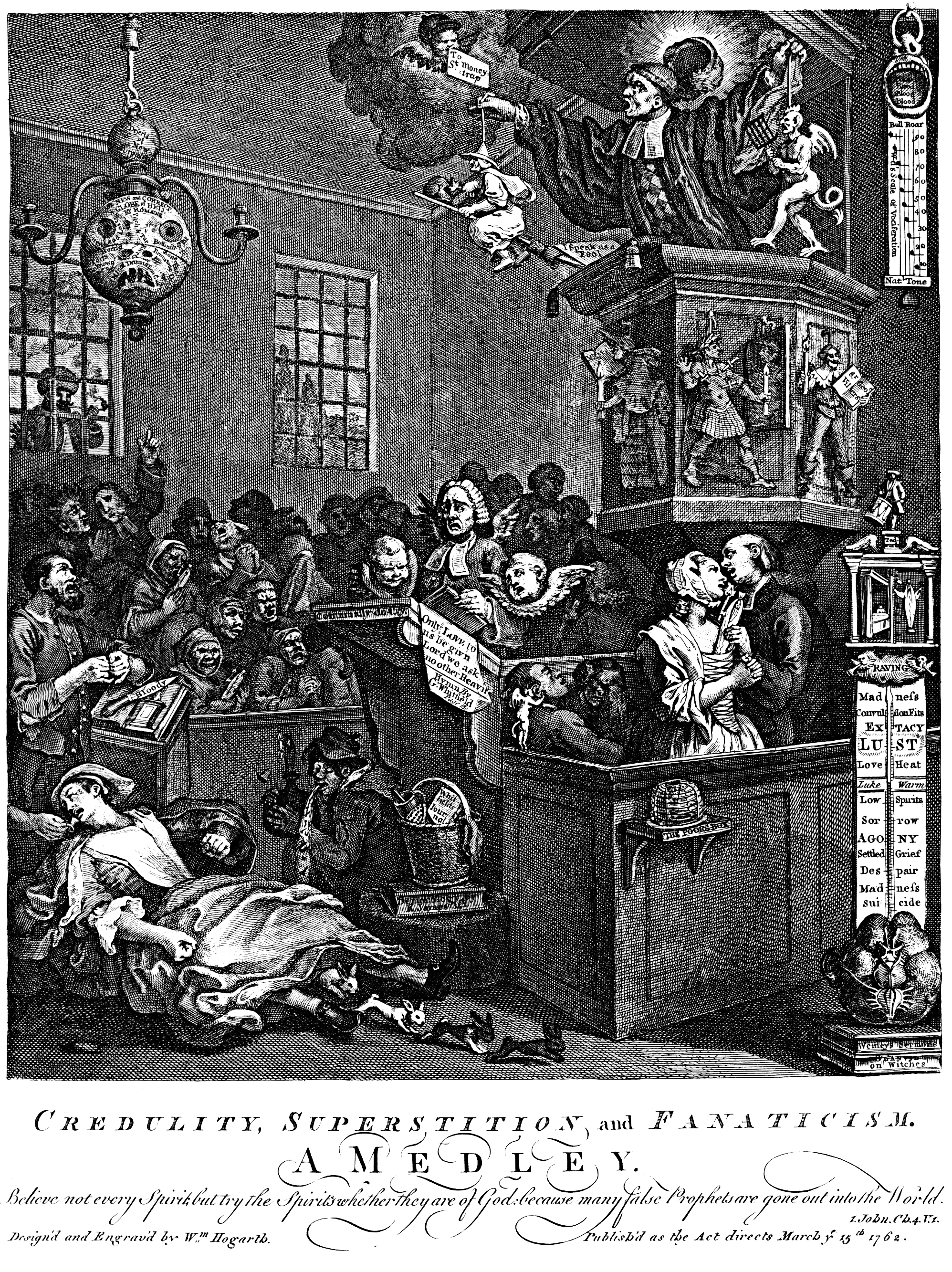
Credulity, Superstition, and Fanaticism (c.1760/1762)

- Time Smoking a Picture (1761)—intended as a subscription ticket for the projected print of Sigismunda [208]
- Five Orders of Periwigs (1761) [209]
- Credulity, Superstition, and Fanaticism (c.1760/1762) [210] Two versions:
  - Enthusiasm Delineated—a scathing attack on Methodism which was not issued
  - A Medley
- The Farmer's Return (1762)—frontispiece for David Garrick's play [240*]
- The Times (1762) [211,212]
  - Plate 1
  - Plate 2
- Henry Fielding at the Age of Forty Eight (c.1762)—drawn from memory for the frontispiece for the first edition of Fielding's Works [241*]
- Jack in an Office (probably before 1763) [213]
- Frontispiece to Clubbe's Physiognomy / The Weighing House (1763) [242*]
- John Wilkes Esq.(1763)—a response to Wilke's criticism of Hogarth's work [214]
- The Bruiser, C. Churchill (1763)—also in response to criticism it appeared in at least six states [215]
- Tailpiece, or The Bathos (1764) [216]
- Apology for Painters - unfinished manuscript (late)
- Here Justice Triumphs in His Elbow Chair (not published in Hogarth's lifetime)

== Date unknown ==
- Portrait of a Young Woman Museum voor Schone Kunsten, Ghent

== Lost ==
- Danaë—referred to by Walpole
- The Scotch Congregation—supposedly "almost unique on account of its extreme indecency"

== Attributed to Hogarth ==
Various works which are either wrongly attributed to Hogarth, unlikely to be his work, or where some doubt exists as to whether they are his.

- Peter Monamy Showing a Picture to Mr. Walker (c.1730–32). Since about 1980 this painting has almost universally been attributed to Gawen Hamilton (1698 — 1737). See "French and British Paintings from 1600 to 1800 in The Art Institute of Chicago": entry on Gawen Hamilton by Malcolm Warner. The painting is not mentioned by Ronald Paulson.
- Night Encounter (c.1738) Listed in the Tate 1972 catalogue, Paulson says "It may be by Hogarth"
- Frederick, Prince of Wales (c.1736–38)—attributed to Hogarth by the Royal Collection
- Augusta, Princess of Wales (c.1736–38)—attributed to Hogarth by the Royal Collection
- Boy with a Paper-kite (date unknown)
- Virtuous Courtship (1759) possibly a companion piece to The Lady's Last Stake
- Girl with a Cage Hogarth's name is on the back of the painting
- A View in a Village near London (date unknown)
- A View of St. James's Park exhibited in 1814 as by Hogarth but probably by J. Wale
- Rosamond's Pond claimed by Samuel Ireland to be by Hogarth
- Button's Coffee House (possibly "in the style of" by S. Ireland?)
- Taste, or Burlington Gate—dismissed as Hogarth's work by Paulson on stylistic grounds
- The Politician (not by Hogarth but based on one of his sketches)
- Shop card for Richard Lee—a variation on A Midnight Modern Conversation, it is dismissed as Hogarth's work by Paulson on stylistic grounds
