= Statue of Thomas Coram =

Statue in Bloomsbury, London

Coordinates: 51.525100°N 0.121376°W

Thomas Coram
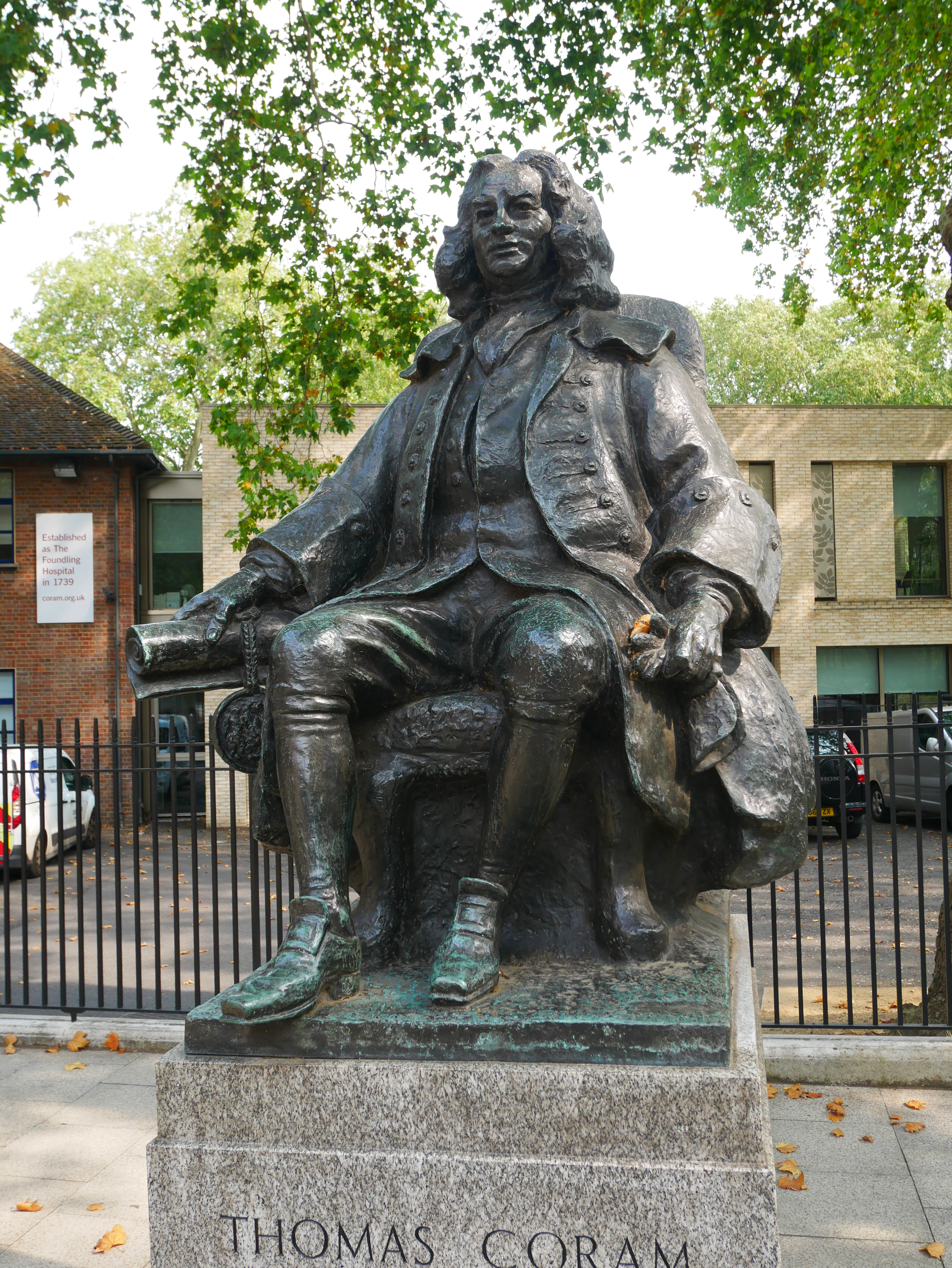
- Artist: William McMillan
- Completion date: 1963
- Subject: Thomas Coram
- Location: London

Listed Building – Grade II
- Official name: Statue of Thomas Coram Outside Number 40 Brunswick Square
- Designated: 14 May 1974
- Reference no.: 1272393

A statue of Thomas Coram, by William McMillan stands in Brunswick Square Gardens in Bloomsbury, London. The statue is Grade II listed.

== Background ==
Thomas Coram was a sea captain and philanthropist who founded the Foundling Hospital in 1739. The hospital was founded as an institution for the raising of abandoned children, often orphaned as a result of illegitimate births. The hospital stood on the site now occupied by Coram's Fields close to where Coram's statue stands.

Completed in 1963, the statue sits outside the Foundling Museum, both a museum of the hospital but also a significant for its historic role as a cultural institution. The London première of Handel's Messiah was held there, and the museum houses a collection of works by significant artists of the eighteenth-century, many of which were given as contributions for the upkeep of the hospital. Among the artists with works held there isHogarth who convinced other artists of hospital's cause. He produced the portrait of Coram, today held in the museum, which would be used as a template for the design of the statue.

An older statue of Coram by William Calder Marshall, completed in 1852, previously stood in the area but was moved to Ashlyns School in Berkhamstead in 1926 but no longer survives. The current statue was completed in 1963 by William McMillan.

== Description ==
The statue is of bronze upon a granite plinth, Coram depicted holding a scroll in his right hand. On the rear of the plinth is a plaque describing Coram's life, with inscription on the front reading:

Thomas Coram 1668-1751. Pioneer in the cause of child welfare

Beneath is a talking statues plaque.
