= The Analysis of Beauty =

1753 book by William Hogarth

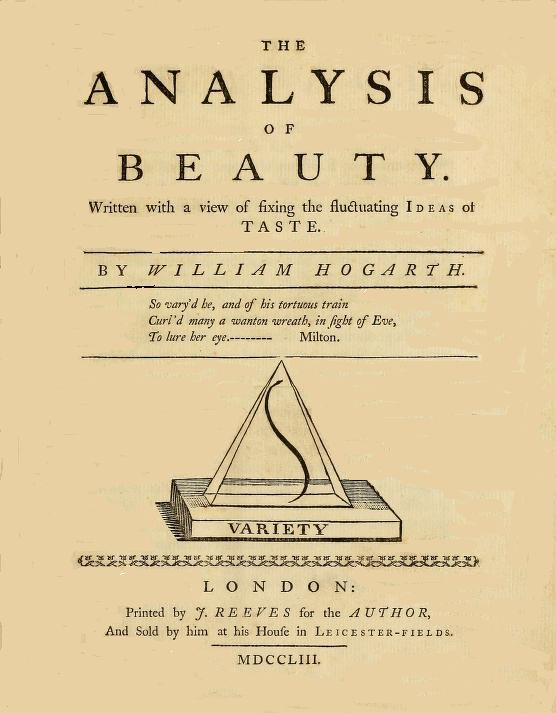
Title page of the first edition

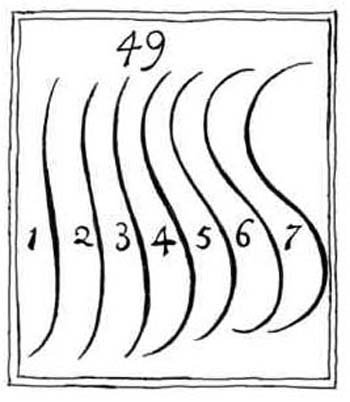
Serpentine lines in a plate from The Analysis of Beauty

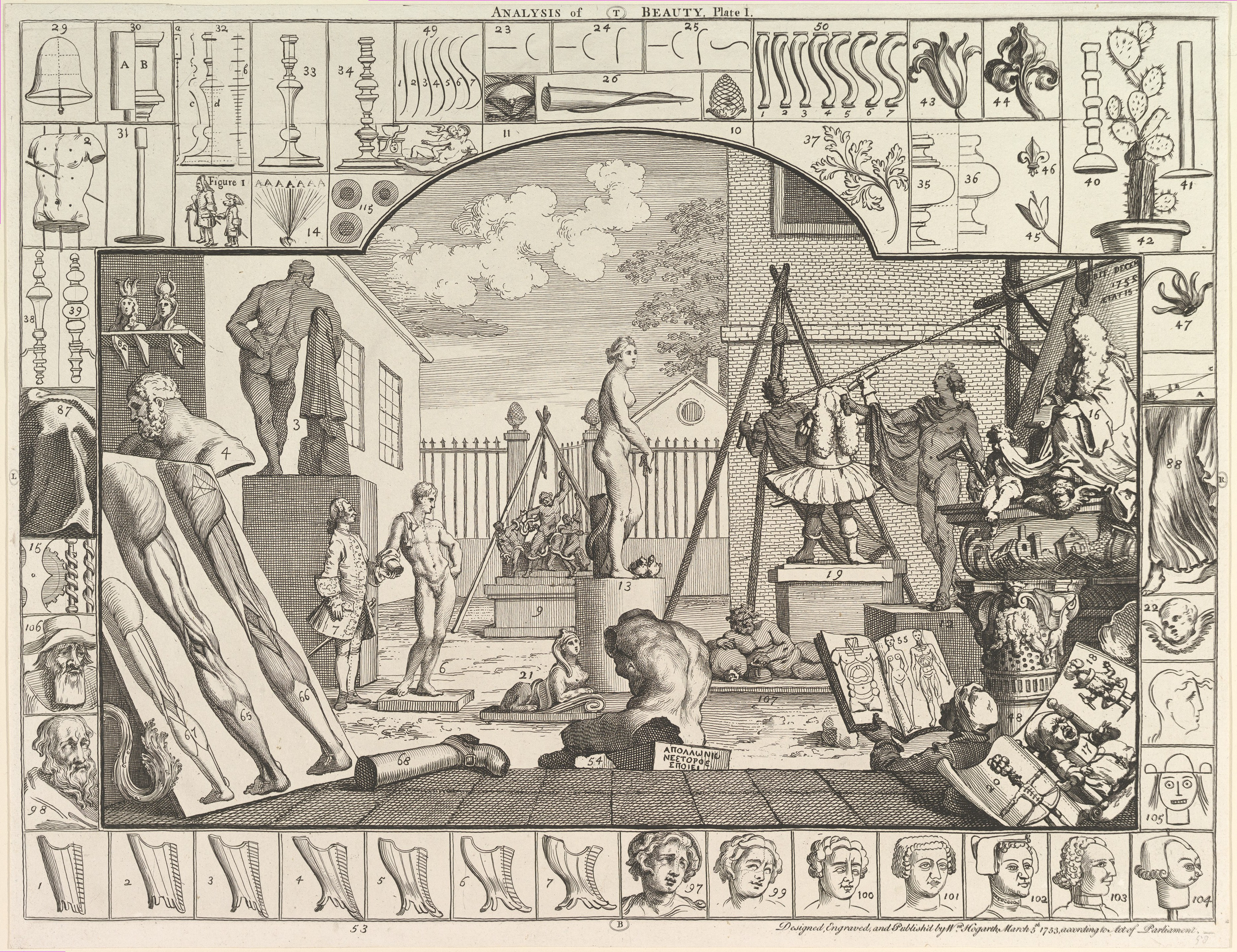
The Analysis of Beauty plate 1

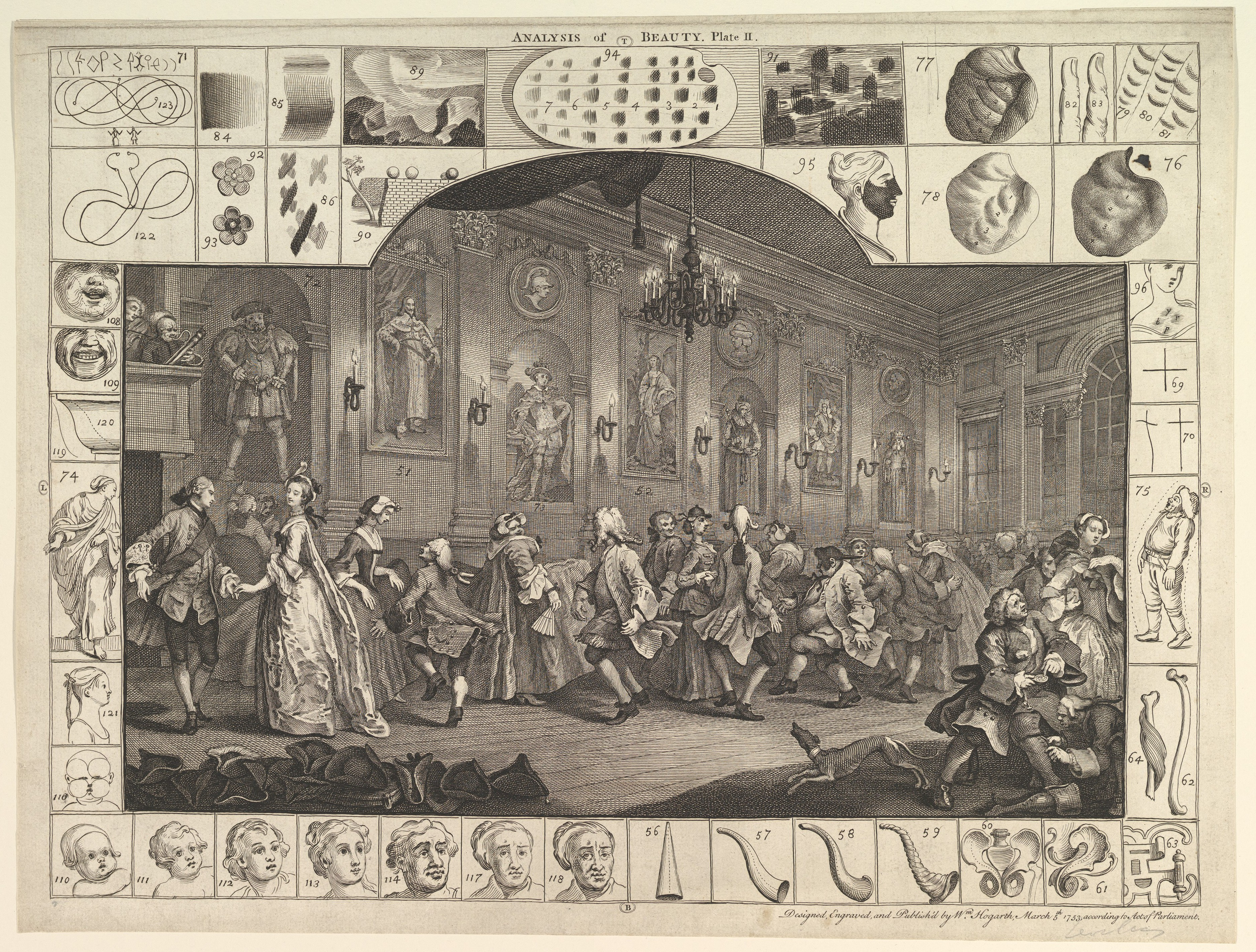
The Analysis of Beauty plate 2

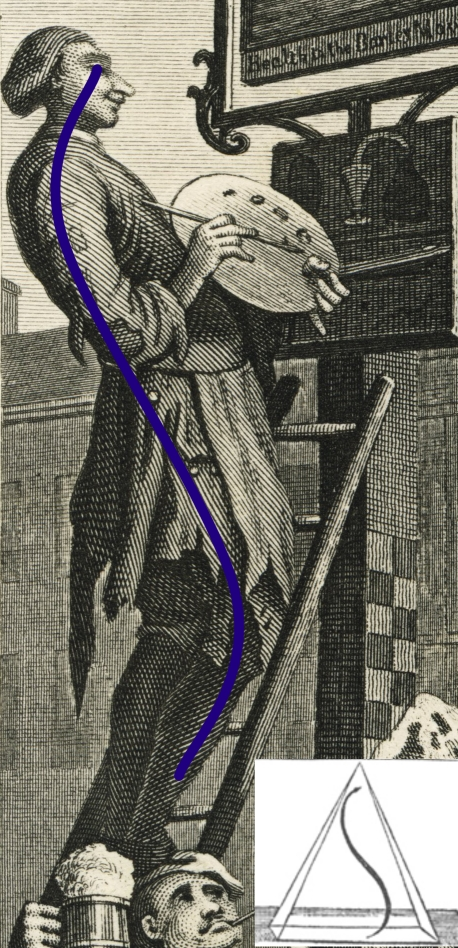
The line of beauty denoted on Hogarth's 1751 Beer Street sign painter

The Analysis of Beauty is a book written by the 18th-century artist and writer William Hogarth, published in 1753, which describes Hogarth's theories of visual beauty and grace in a manner accessible to the common man of his day.

== The "Line of Beauty" ==
Prominent among Hogarth's ideas of beauty was the theory of the Line of Beauty; an S-shaped (serpentine) curved line that excited the attention of the viewer and evoked liveliness and movement. The Analysis of Beauty formed the intellectual centerpiece of what the historian Ernst Gombrich described as Hogarth's "grim campaign against the fashionable taste", which Hogarth himself described as his "War with the Connoisseurs".

== Six principles ==
In The Analysis of Beauty Hogarth implements six principles that independently affect beauty. Although he concurs that those principles have an effect, he is not determinate on their specific influence. The first principle of beauty Hogarth describes is fitness, which is not in itself a source of beauty, but can be described as a material cause of it. Though the account of fitness on the total beauty of an object is only moderate, it is a necessary cause. Fitness does not necessarily imply purpose. However, improperly implied forms cannot be the source of beauty. It is in this that the necessity of fitness must be seen: if not accounted for, a form cannot readily be assumed beautiful.

The second major principle of beauty is variety. It is the source of beauty, which Hogarth shows us by the contrary notion of "sameness": "sameness", a lack of variety, offends the senses. "The ear is as much offended with one even continued note, as the eye is with being fix'd to a point, or to the view of a dead wall." In contrast, our senses find relief in discovering a certain amount of "sameness" within a varietal experience.

The third notion of regularity is understood as a form of "composed variety": it only pleases us when it is suggestive to fitness. Similar to this notion in effect is simplicity, which enhances the pleasure of variety in that it pleases the eye. The variety which causes a beautiful experience should, so to speak, be tempered by simplicity. On the other hand: simplicity without variety at best does only not displease.

Intricacy is a strange principle in that it does not directly follow from the formal behaviour of a beautiful object. Hogarth means by this the habit which causes us to end up in the whirling game of pursuit, when bit by bit discovering the beauty of an object. Intricacy arises from the love of this pursuit. Every difficulty in understanding or grasping the object enhances the pleasure of overcoming it, to continue the pursuit. There is a direct connection here to the Line of Beauty Hogarth dictates, along which every image is built up. Though the movement of our eye is discrete in itself, the movement of our "Mind's eye" follows a duplicate course of the line, a principal ray of light moving along with the line of sight. The continuous movement of our "Mind's eye" triggers the notion of intricacy.

Quantity, finally, is associated with the notion of the sublime, which, when Hogarth's book appeared, was not yet entirely distinguished from the apprehension of beauty. Hogarth thus does not speak of sublimity, but of greatness. He recognises a great quantity to have an aesthetic effect on the beholder without the necessity of a varietal or fitting form. This should not be exaggerated, as that might lead to absurdities.

== See also ==
- List of works by William Hogarth

== References and sources ==
Sources

- The Beautiful, the Sublime and the Picturesque in Eighteenth-Century British Aesthetic Theory, Walter John Hipple Jr., Southern Illinois University Press, 1957.
