= Angerstein Collection =

The Angerstein Collection comprises 38 paintings that were bought by the British government from the collection of John Julius Angerstein after his death in 1823. They became the first works held by the National Gallery, London, on its foundation in 1824, including the works now catalogued in its collection as NG1, NG2 and NG3, and others up to NG122. They were initially displayed at Angerstein's townhouse at 100 Pall Mall. Other early works acquired by the National Gallery include 16 paintings donated by Sir George Beaumont in 1826, and a bequest of 35 paintings by the Reverend William Holwell Carr by 1831.

The collection includes many Old Masters, including five by Claude Lorrain, four attributed to Annibale Carracci or his cousin Ludovico Carracci or their circle, three by Anthony van Dyck, three after Correggio, two by Titian or his workshop, two by Rembrandt or his workshop, two by Gaspard Dughet, and two by Peter Paul Rubens, as well as single paintings by Aelbert Cuyp, Damiano Mazza, Raphael, Sebastiano del Piombo, and Justus Sustermans, and one after Nicolas Poussin. It also included several more modern paintings: seven works by William Hogarth, including the complete series of six paintings of Marriage A-la-Mode, and one painting each by Joshua Reynolds and David Wilkie.

== List of works ==
Image	Artist	Title	Date	Current collection	Acc. no.
	Sebastiano del Piombo	The Raising of Lazarus	1517–1519	National Gallery	NG1
	Claude Lorrain	Landscape with Cephalus and Procris reunited by Diana	1645	National Gallery	NG2
	Possibly by Titian	The Music Lesson	c. 1535	National Gallery	NG3
	Claude Lorrain	A Seaport	1644	National Gallery	NG5
	After Correggio	Group of Heads	before 1587	National Gallery	NG7
	Claude Lorrain	The Mill (or Landscape with the Marriage of Isaac and Rebecca)	1648	National Gallery	NG12
	Claude Lorrain	Seaport with the Embarkation of the Queen of Sheba	1648	National Gallery	NG14
	Circle of Annibale Carracci	Saint John the Baptist seated in the Wilderness	early 17th century	National Gallery	NG25
	Raphael	Portrait of Pope Julius II	1511	National Gallery	NG27
	Ludovico Carracci	Susannah and the Elders	1616	National Gallery	NG28
	Claude Lorrain	Seaport with the Embarkation of Saint Ursula	1641	National Gallery	NG30
	Gaspard Dughet	Landscape with Abraham and Isaac	c. 1665	National Gallery	NG31
	Damiano Mazza	The Rape of Ganymede	c. 1575	National Gallery	NG32
	Workshop of Titian	Venus and Adonis	c. 1554	National Gallery	NG34
	Gaspard Dughet	Landscape with a Storm	c. 1660	National Gallery	NG36
	After Correggio	Group of Heads	before 1587	National Gallery	NG37
	Peter Paul Rubens	The Rape of the Sabine Women	probably 1635–1640	National Gallery	NG38
	Nicolas Poussin	The Triumph of Silenus	c. 1636	National Gallery	NG42
	Rembrandt	The Woman Taken in Adultery	1644	National Gallery	NG45
	Pupil of Rembrandt	The Adoration of the Shepherds	1646	National Gallery	NG47
	Anthony van Dyck	Portrait of George Gage with Two Attendants	probably 1622–1623	National Gallery	NG49
	Anthony van Dyck	Saint Ambrose barring Theodosius from Milan Cathedral	c. 1619–1620	National Gallery	NG50
	Anthony van Dyck	Portrait of Cornelis van der Geest	c. 1620	National Gallery	NG52
	Aelbert Cuyp	A Hilly Landscape with Figures	c. 1655–1660	National Gallery	NG53
	Workshop of Peter Paul Rubens	The Holy Family with Saints in a Landscape	after 1635	National Gallery	NG67
	After Correggio	The Agony in the Garden	probably c. 1640–1750	National Gallery	NG76
	Circle of Annibale Carracci	Erminia takes Refuge with the Shepherds	early 17th century	National Gallery	NG88
	Justus Sustermans	Double Portrait of the Grand Duke Ferdinand II of Tuscany and his Wife Vittoria della Rovere	probably 1660s	National Gallery	NG89
	Annibale Carracci	Marsyas and Olympus	1597–1600	National Gallery	NG94
	Joshua Reynolds	Portrait of Lord Heathfield with the keys of Gibraltar	1787	National Gallery	NG111
	William Hogarth	The Painter and his Pug	1745	Tate	N00112
	William Hogarth	Marriage A-la-Mode: 1. The Marriage Settlement	c. 1743	National Gallery	NG113
	William Hogarth	Marriage A-la-Mode: 2. The Tête à Tête	c. 1743	National Gallery	NG114
	William Hogarth	Marriage A-la-Mode: 3. The Inspection	c. 1743	National Gallery	NG115
	William Hogarth	Marriage A-la-Mode: 4. The Toilette	c. 1743	National Gallery	NG116
	William Hogarth	Marriage A-la-Mode: 5. The Bagnio	c. 1743	National Gallery	NG117
	William Hogarth	Marriage A-la-Mode: 6. The Lady's Death	c. 1743	National Gallery	NG118
	David Wilkie	The Village Holiday	1809–1811	Tate	N00122
