= Antonio Maria Ferraboschi =

Italian stucco artist

Antonio Maria Ferraboschi (1674–1738) was an Italian stucco artist, active during the Rococo period in Northern Italy.

He was born in Parma, and very active in the city. Among his works are decorations, along with the fellow stucco artist Michele Costa in the Sanctuary of the Blessed Virgin of the Gate, Guastalla, and the Oratory of San Luigi, also called del Riscatto in San Secondo Parmense.

He helped decorate the interiors, in collaboration with Andrea Sghizzi and Paolo Frisoni of the Palazzo Farnese of Piacenza. In Parma, he participated in the large company of stucco artists that decorated the Teatro Farnese, the church of the Santissima Annunziata, the Oratory dei Rossi. He also worked during 1730–1740 in the church of Santa Maria Assunta of Sissa. He contributed to the scagliola decoration of a chapel (1724) in the Duomo of Carpi.
