= Sanctuary of the Blessed Virgin of the Gate, Guastalla =

Church in Guastalla, Italy

Coordinates: 44°55′07″N 10°39′10″E

The Sanctuary of the Blessed Virgin of the Gate (Santuario della Beata Vergine della Porta) is a Baroque style, Roman Catholic church in the town of Guastalla, region of Emilia-Romagna, Italy. The Sanctuary takes its name from the presence of the ancient gate of St. Francis (Porta di San Francesco) near the site.

== History ==
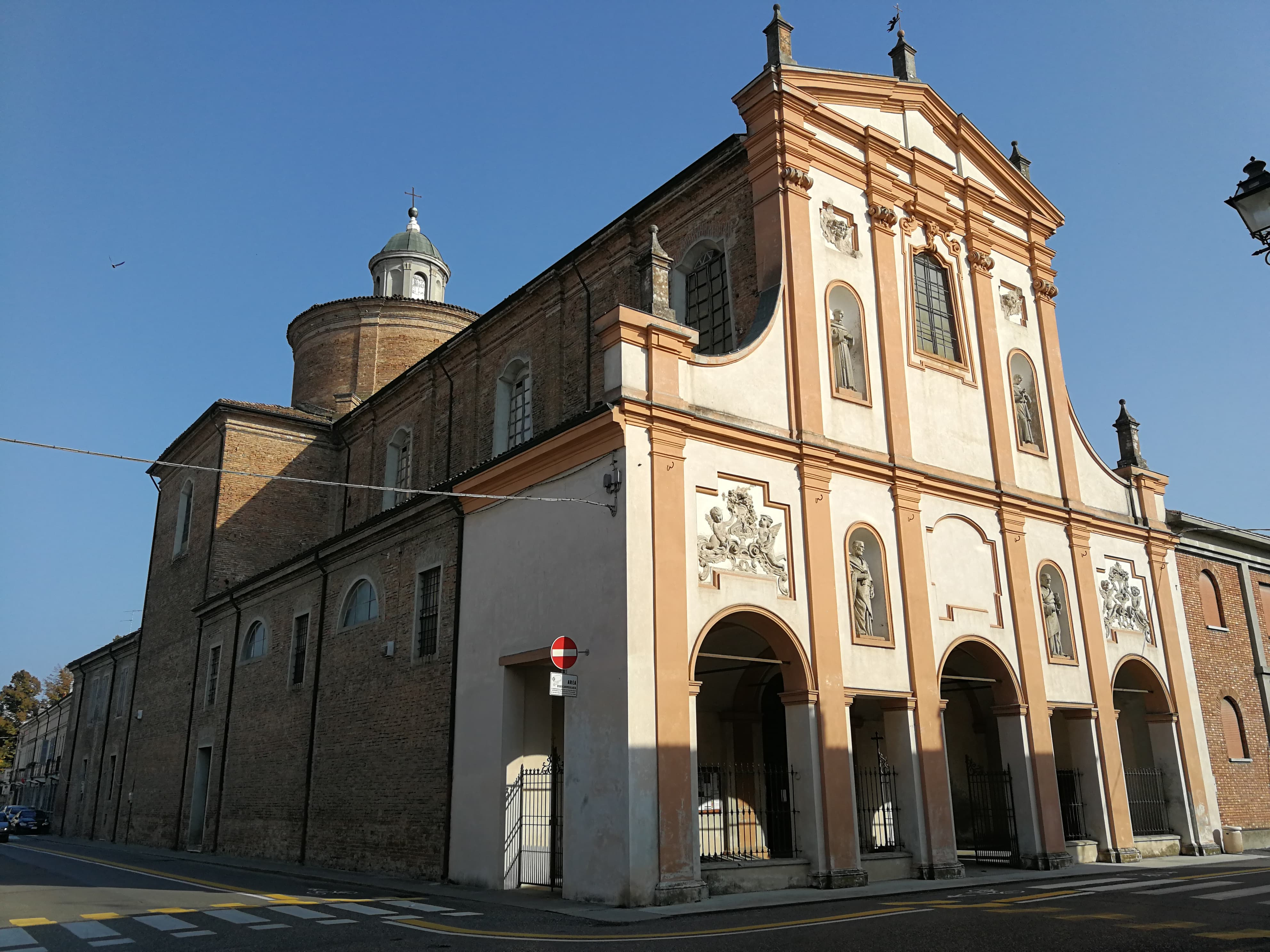
Sanctuary of the Blessed Virgin of the Gate

An icon of the Madonna painted in 1646 by Damiano Padovani, had begun to be attached to miracles, and this led the Duke of Mantua, Vincenzo Gonzaga to commission a design from Prospero Mattioli in 1693, when construction began. The church was consecrated in 1709, but labor on construction continued for many decades.

In 1702, when Guastalla was under the siege of the French and Spanish armies, the city promised to the Blessed Virgin Mary to build up two altars: one to the Crucifix and another to the saint recurring in the day of the liberation. Guastale was liberated in July 1703.

The Padovani altarpiece is sheltered at the main altar in a ciborium (1702), the altar scagliola panels has spiralling columns with a triumph of angels by Antonio Maria Ferraboschi and Michele Costa. The large collection of votive offerings displayed in the museum adjacent to the church testifies to the miracles performed. The altar of San Francesco da Paola, erected in 1741 (right arm of the transept) is the work of Pietro Franzini. The statues of the twelve prophets (1786) were created by Giovanni Marini da Viadana.

In 2014, the church was closed for restoration.
