= Giovanni Battista Fornovo =

Italian architect

Giovanni Battista Fornovo (1521–1575) was an Italian architect, active in a late-Renaissance style in Parma.

Around 1560, he helped design the church of the Santissima Annunziata, Parma while working as the court architect for Ottavio Farnese, Duke of Parma and Piacenza.
