= The Village Holiday =

Painting by David Wilkie

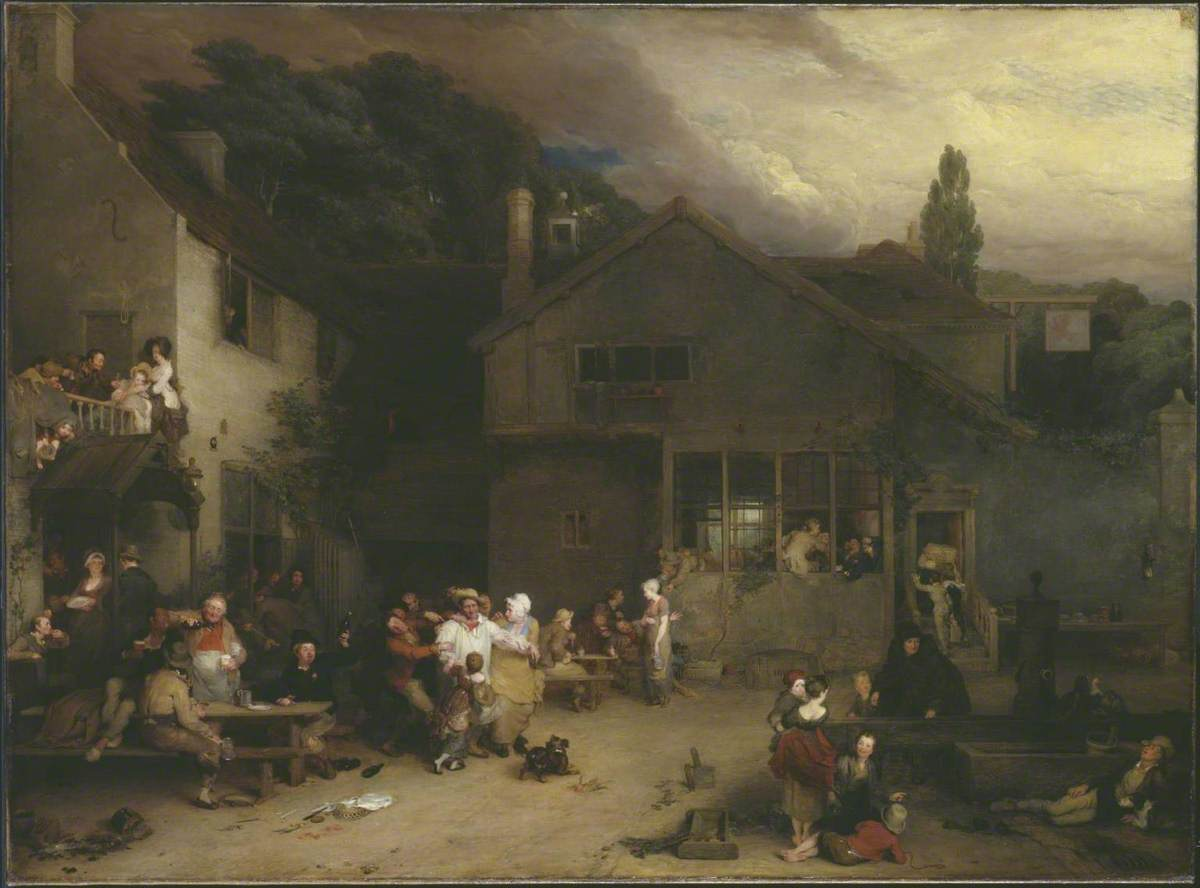
- Artist: David Wilkie
- Year: 1811
- Type: Oil on canvas, genre painting
- Dimensions: 127.6 cm × 94 cm (50.2 in × 37 in)
- Location: Tate Britain, London

The Village Holiday is an 1811 genre painting by the British artist David Wilkie. It depicts a scene outside an ale house, and was originally titled The Public House Door. Its final title is a misnomer, as it in fact depicts an inn then on the outskirts of London at Paddington. The Scottish-born London-based artist made his name with such narrative genre pieces before later turning to portraits and history paintings on a greater scale. Stylistically it references the seventeenth century genre works of the Dutch Old Master David Teniers the Younger.

Begun in 1809, it was not completed until two years earlier. It was the centrepiece of a solo art exhibition Wilkie staged in 1812. Today the painting is in of the Tate Collection, having been purchased for the National Gallery in 1824. It was acquired as part of the collection of John Julius Angerstein and was therefore the only work of a living artist to feature in the initial National Gallery after its establishment. It is currently on loan to the National Gallery to celebration the institution's bicentenary.

== Bibliography ==
- Noon, Patrick & Bann, Stephen. Constable to Delacroix: British Art and the French Romantics. Tate, 2003.
- Solkin, David H. Painting Out of the Ordinary: Modernity and the Art of Everyday Life in Early Nineteenth-century Britain. Yale University Press, 2009.
- Tromans, Nicholas. David Wilkie: The People's Painter. Edinburgh University Press, 2007.
