= Marriage A-la-Mode: 4. The Toilette =

Painting by William Hogarth

- Artist: William Hogarth
- Year: 1743
- Medium: Oil on canvas
- Dimensions: 69.9 cm × 90.8 cm (27.5 in × 35.7 in)
- Location: National Gallery, London

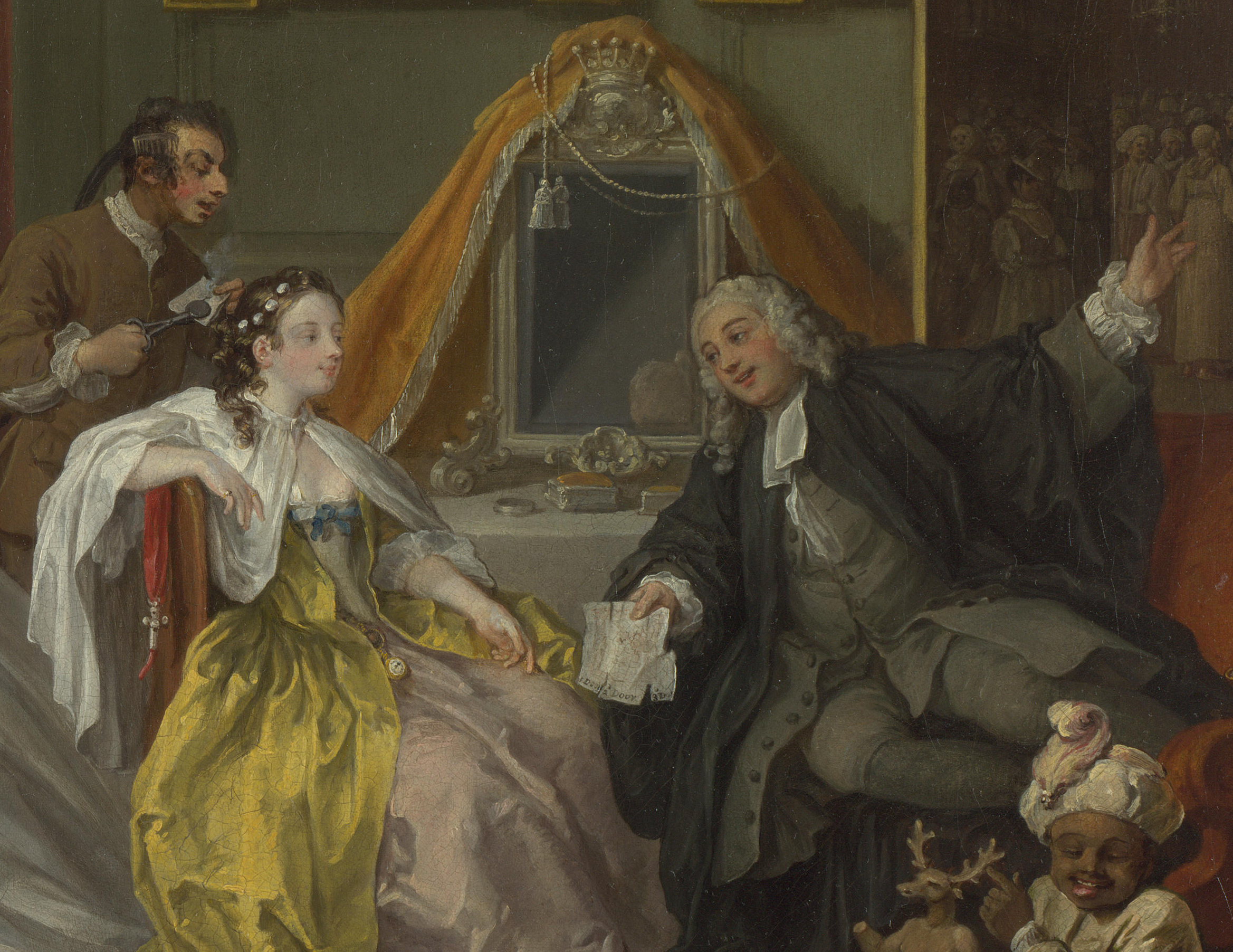
Detail

The Toilette, called The countess's morning levee on the frame, is the fourth canvas in the series of six satirical paintings known as Marriage A-la-Mode painted by William Hogarth.

The old earl has died, so the son is now the new earl, and his wife is the countess. As was still the fashion at the time, the countess is holding a reception during her "toilette", her grooming, in her bedroom, in imitation of this age-old custom of kings called a levee. The fact that Hogarth ridiculed this convocation of people in the bedroom of a noble during their "morning" grooming (often very late in the day) proves that such a convocation in such an intimate room was increasingly viewed as inappropriate and lewd.

== Commentary ==
- The coronet over the bed and over the mirror in the silver toilet service on the dressing table indicate that the old earl has died and that the son is now Earl Squanderfield and his wife is now Countess Squanderfield. The mirror is actually larger than those in surviving royal toilet services.
- The lawyer Silvertongue is lounging on the sofa, with his shoes off and his feet up. He clearly feels at home and in familiar surroundings.
- Although there are other guests in the room, the countess has her back to them, totally absorbed by Silvertongue.
- Silvertongue is making an assignation with the countess, showing her a ticket to a masquerade and pointing to a painting of a masquerade on a screen behind the sofa. The intention being that, as the guests will be wearing masks and therefore unidentifiable, the countess and Silvertongue can safely attend together.
- The Countess is now a mother as, hanging on the back of her chair, is a rope of coral, used by teething children. However, the child is not in the picture, suggesting a lack of maternal instinct.
- The book on the sofa by Silvertongue's feet is The Sofa, the licentious and popular novel by Crébillon, who claimed that his novel had originally been composed in private for Prussian King Frederick the Great. The latter point may not be a coincidence (see below).
- A French valet-de-chambre is attending to the countess's hair.
- On the left there is an opera singer, based upon either Giovanni Carestini, Senesino or possibly Farinelli, all celebrated Italian castrato opera singers.
- The flutist is often said to be based upon Karl Friedrich Weidemann, a well known flutist of the time and music-teacher to George III. A more recent interpretation suggests that this figure might be a satirical depiction of Frederick the Great, who played the flute very well and was crazy about Italian castrati.
- The gentleman in blue has curl papers in his hair. Some sources say that he is based upon Herr Michel, the Prussian envoy. However, Georg Christoph Lichtenberg is of the opinion that this figure represents Lord Squanderfield.
- The lady in white is overcome by music and singing. She is based upon Mrs Lane-Fox, later Lady Bingley, who was known to have a passion for Italian music.
- The two old master paintings on the right wall show Lot and his Daughters, a Biblical reference to incest, and Jupiter and Io (after Correggio), a mythological reference to seduction.
- The lower picture on the left wall is another old master, Rape of Ganymede (after Michelangelo), a mythological reference to homosexual seduction and a possible allusion to the sexual preferences of Frederick the Great who is probably intentionally standing directly in front of the picture.
- The upper left painting is the lawyer himself, Silvertongue. Clearly, the new earl has not visited his wife's bedroom for a long time. However, according to Lichtenberg, this time he is present, the curl papers in his hair signifying that he has been cuckolded by his wife.
- The black page boy in the bottom right corner is examining a collection of hideous ornaments (similar to those on the mantelpiece in the second painting), purchased at the sale of Timothy Babyhouse, Esquire. He points to the horns on a statue of Actaeon, with an impish grin: he knows what the lady of the house has been up to (horns are a symbol of cuckoldry).
- Scattered on the floor on the left among playing cards are a number of invitations: "Lady Squader's company is desired at Lady Townly's drum next Monday;" "Lady Squander's company is desired at Lady Heatham's drum-major next Sunday" and "Lady Squander's company is desired at Miss Hairbrain's rout," (Hogarth making a joke with the sequence "drum," "drum-major" and "rout"). There is also a note, "Count Basset begs to no how Lade Squander sleapt(slept) last nite(night)."

== See also ==
- List of works by William Hogarth
- Marriage A-la-Mode: 1. The Marriage Settlement
- Marriage A-la-Mode: 2. The Tête à Tête
- Marriage A-la-Mode: 3. The Inspection
- Marriage A-la-Mode: 5. The Bagnio
- Marriage A-la-Mode: 6. The Lady's Death
