= Santissima Annunziata, Parma =

Church building in Parma, Italy

Coordinates: 44°48′9.35″N 10°19′17.80″E

The Santissima Annunziata, also called the Basilica del Paradiso, is a Renaissance style, Roman Catholic church and convent located on Via Massimo D'Azeglio in Parma, Italy.

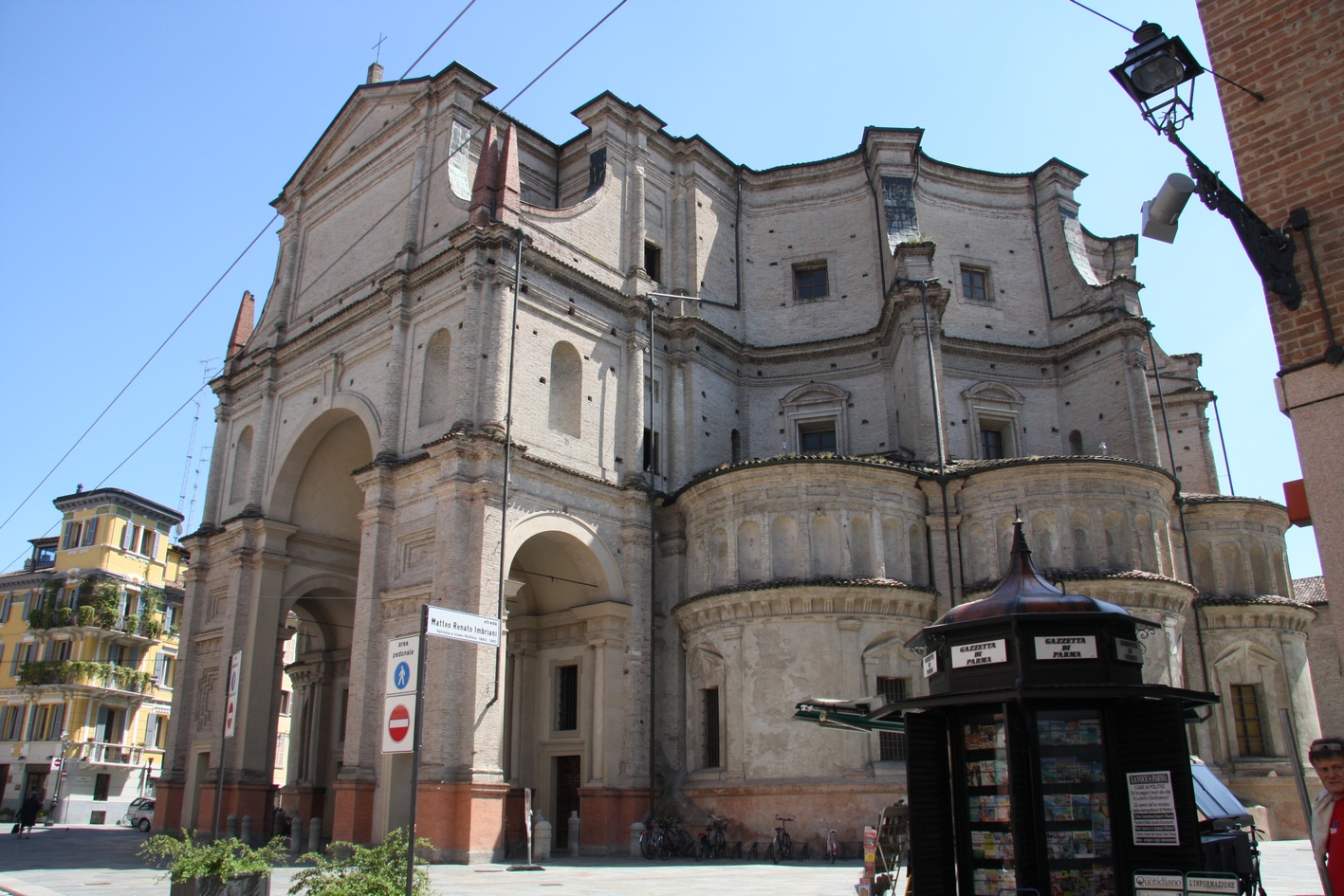
Facade and dome.

== History ==
The church was built on a site of a convent once occupied by the Franciscan Order outside the city walls, but demolished in 1546 by the Duke Pier Luigi Farnese. Originally the church was dedicated to Saints Gervaso and Protaso. Construction began in 1566, commissioned by Duke Ottavio Farnese and the bishop of Brugnato, and using a design by Giambattista Fornovo.

By 1616, construction had stalled, part of the roof fallen in, and there was a failure to complete the planned dome. Only with the intervention of Margherita Farnese (who became a nun) did construction proceeded using an awkward, heavily buttressed dome design by Girolamo Rainaldi. The layout has a nearly elliptical interior, with two semi-circles joined by two straight lines, which join the apse, ten chapels, and an interior atrium.

The convent was designed in part by Giovanni Battista Magnani, with the refectory completed in 1637 and cloister in 1688. The convent includes a large library. The convent contains the rooms and artifacts of the Blessed Lino Maupas (died 1924).

In the left atrium there is a copy of the Annunciation by Correggio (1520), a fresco from the church of the Minors in via Farini. In the niche is an polychrome terracotta sculpture depicting Ecce Homo by Antonio Sbravati, and a Martyrdom of Saints Gervaso and Protaso (early 19th-century) by Biagio Martini. The main altarpiece is an Enthroned Madonna, Child and Saints Bernard, John Baptist, John Evangelist and Francis of Assisi (1776) by Antonio Brianti, is a copy of a work (1518) by Francesco Zaganelli for the church of the "Annunziata di fuori".

In the fourth chapel to the left, there are depictions of Life of St Peter of Alcantara (early 18th-century) by Pier Ilario Spolverini. In the ninth chapel, there is a St Bonaventure genuflecting before the Virgin by Sebastiano Galeotti. In the tenth chapel, there is the baptismal fountain by Camillo Uccelli. Among other artists with works is Giovanni Battista Tinti.

The Baroque stucco decoration in the nave is attributed to Luca and Giovanni Battista Reti. The organ is by Giuseppe Serassi.

== See also ==
- Catholic Church in Italy
