= Damiano Mazza (artist) =

Italian painter

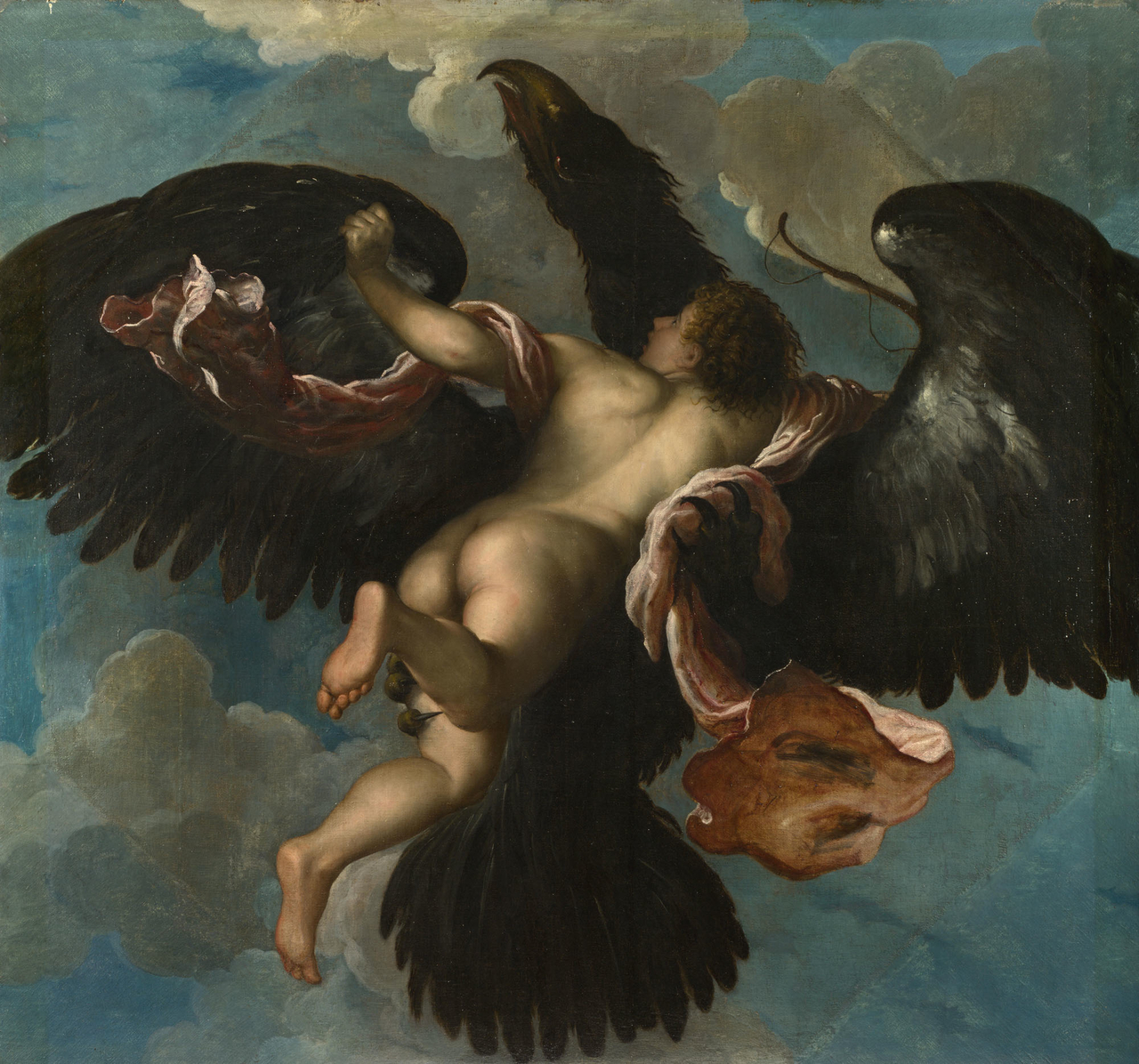
Damiano Mazza, The Rape of Ganymede (c. 1575), National Gallery, London

Damiano Mazza (active 1573–1590) was an Italian Renaissance artist. He lived in the Venetian city of Padua, 40 km west of Venice. It is known that he studied under Titian.

Mazza's best-known painting is The Rape of Ganymede in the National Gallery, London, which originally adorned the ceiling of a lawyer's house in Padua. He also painted an icon of the Madonna for the Santuario della Beata Vergine della Porta in Guastalla.
