= Marriage A-la-Mode: 1. The Marriage Settlement =

Painting by William Hogarth

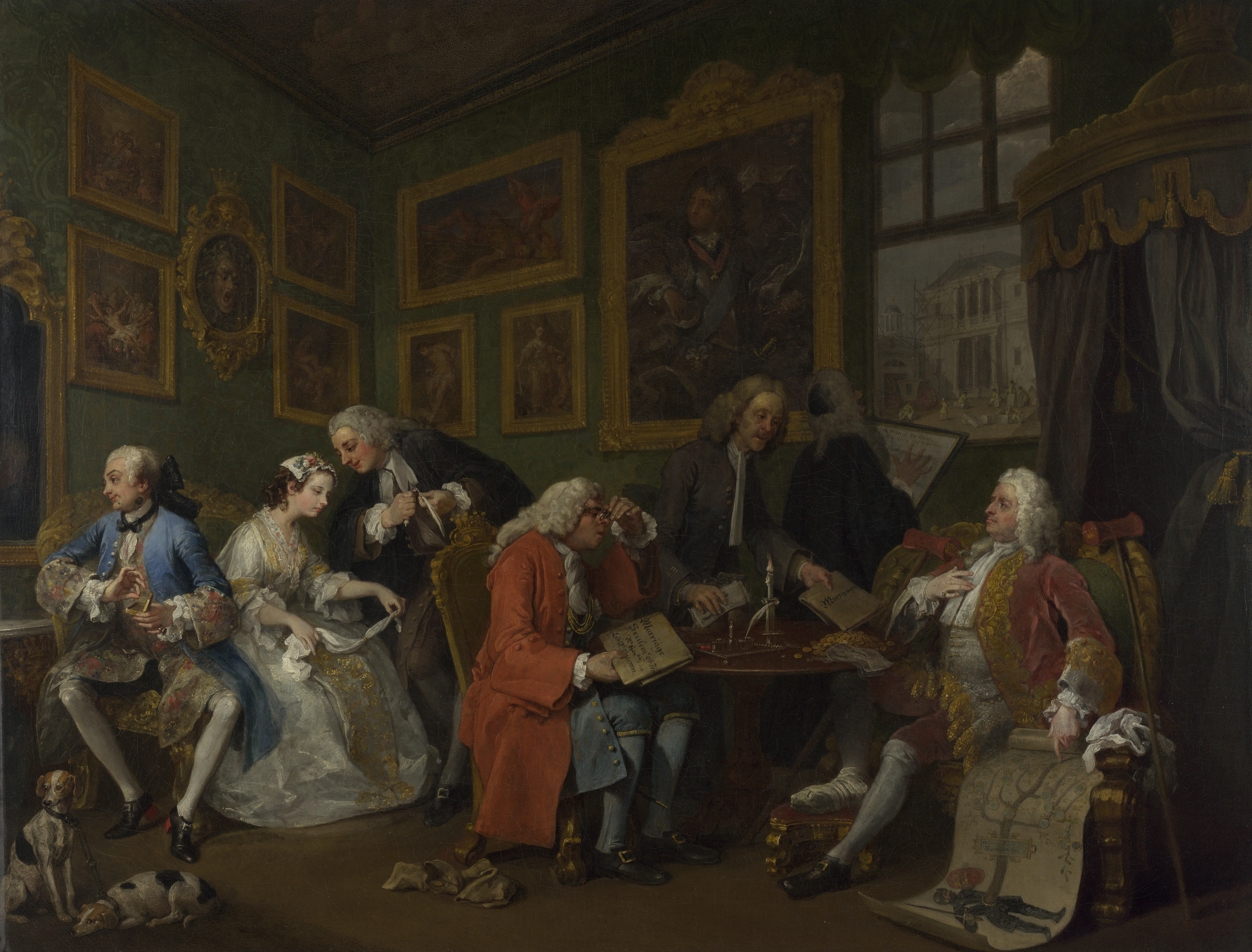
- Artist: William Hogarth
- Year: 1743
- Medium: Oil on canvas
- Dimensions: 69.9 cm × 90.8 cm (27.5 in × 35.7 in)
- Location: National Gallery, London

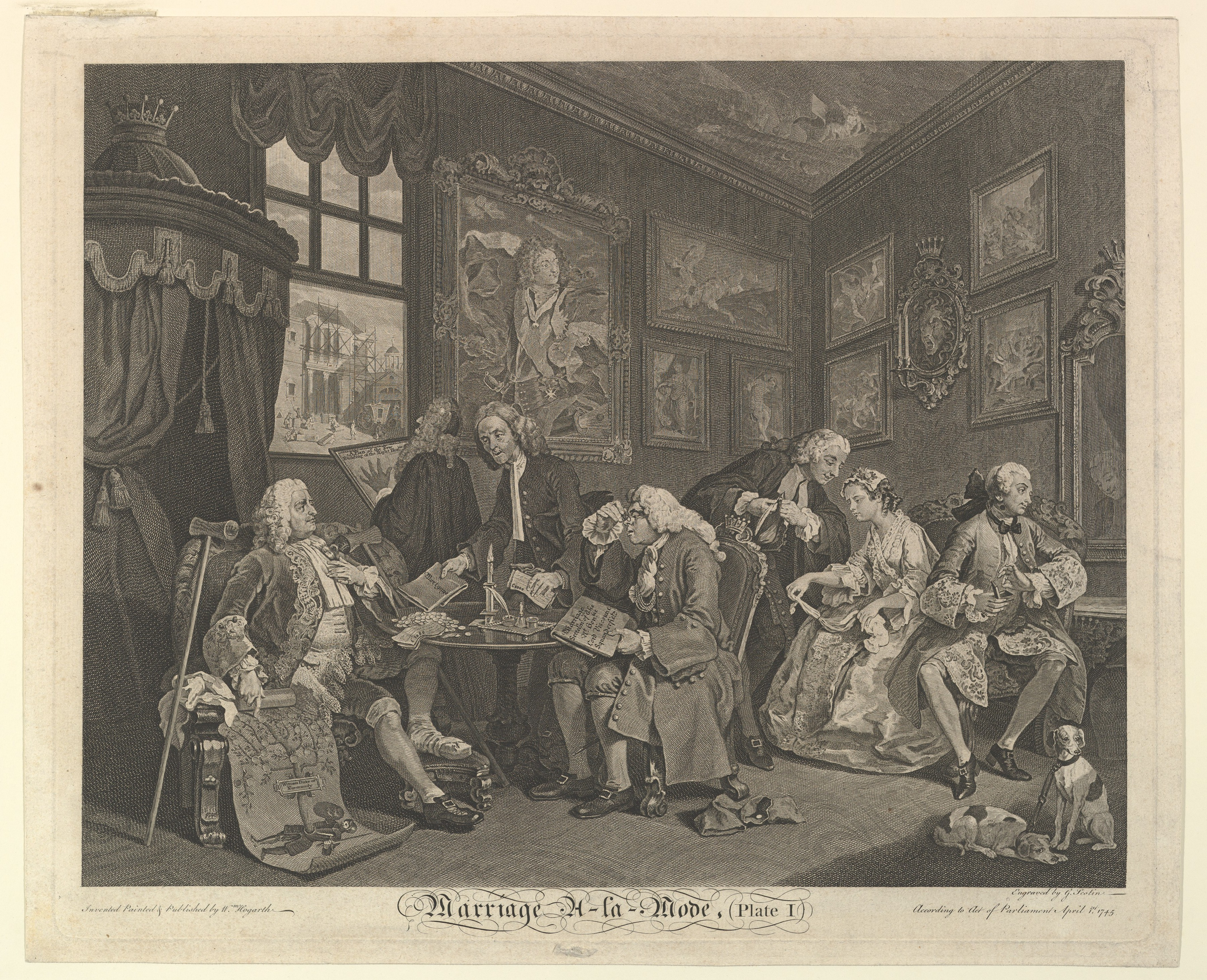
Later engraving of the painting, mirrored and with a clearer reproduction of many figures.

The Marriage Settlement is the first in the series of six satirical paintings known as Marriage A-la-Mode painted by William Hogarth, named after the historical legal arrangement of a marriage settlement.

== People ==
All the main characters are introduced here, at the beginning of the story. Starting with the man under the canopy and moving across the scene there is:

- Earl/Lord Squanderfield
- The man facing out the window, with his back to the scene, perhaps an architect.
- The man standing at the table, perhaps the Earl's creditor
- The Alderman – seated, facing the Earl
- The lawyer Silvertongue – standing, next to the bride
- The bride – seated, next to the Viscount
- Viscount Squanderfield, the Earl's son – seated, on the far left

The only other character who is given a name is the doctor in plate III. Also, Silvertongue is not named until the final plate, VI; his name is given here for convenience.

== Plot ==
The plot of the painting is the unmitigated greed of the two fathers, the Alderman and the Earl. The Alderman is wealthy to excess, and the Earl is heavily in debt but still retains his ancient title. The Alderman is desirous of becoming the grandfather to a noble son, and the Earl wants to ensure his line is carried on, and is willing to put up with the common Alderman for the sake of his money.

Meanwhile, the soon to be married two are completely ignoring each other, and the bride is being courted by the lawyer. Myriad details show the true natures of the characters present, especially the Earl and his son.

== Details ==
The painting is full of satirical detail:

- The Earl is sitting with a bandaged foot resting on a low foot-stool, indicating he is suffering from gout. Gout was associated with overindulgence in alcohol and rich food.
- The Earl clearly thinks a great deal of himself. He is sumptuously dressed and sits under a coroneted canopy in a posture of stereotypical arrogance. There are coronets everywhere, on his foot-stool, crutches, picture frames, and, ludicrously, in the engraving, on the side of one of the dogs.
- The Earl is proudly pointing to himself and his family tree that commences with William, Duke of Normandy (William the Conqueror), indicating a long and noble lineage. About twenty fruit-shaped medals, each with a coronet, hang from the branches. The Earl is pointing to one hanging on the main branch, indicating the directness of his and the Viscount's descent. As a pointed addition, Hogarth has added a broken off branch – a previous marriage outside the nobility that was disowned – not something that would normally be displayed on a family tree. This could indicate that the disowned marriage was morganatic, an ironic commentary on the present "marriage contract" between the noble but nearly bankrupt Earl and the rich but vulgar merchant. Also ironic is the fact that the Earl's own direct lineage does not have a coronet.
- Visible through the window is the cause of the Earl's present financial pressure; he is having an extravagant new home built.
  - The new house is intentionally in the neo-Palladian style which Hogarth despised and thought degenerate, and often made the butt of his satire. In this case the architecture is muddled, with three Corinthian pillars supporting four Ionic ones. The windows in the basement are triangular.
  - The stable entrance is in the front facade and barely tall enough to accommodate a coach, and certainly not high enough to allow the coachman to pass.
- The architect, holding the plans, is staring out the window at the unfinished house, waiting patiently for sufficient funds to allow work to restart. Some commentators have identified him as a lawyer along with Silvertongue here for the bargaining, stating that his facial features and posture indicate his amazed disgust at what even he can tell is hideous.

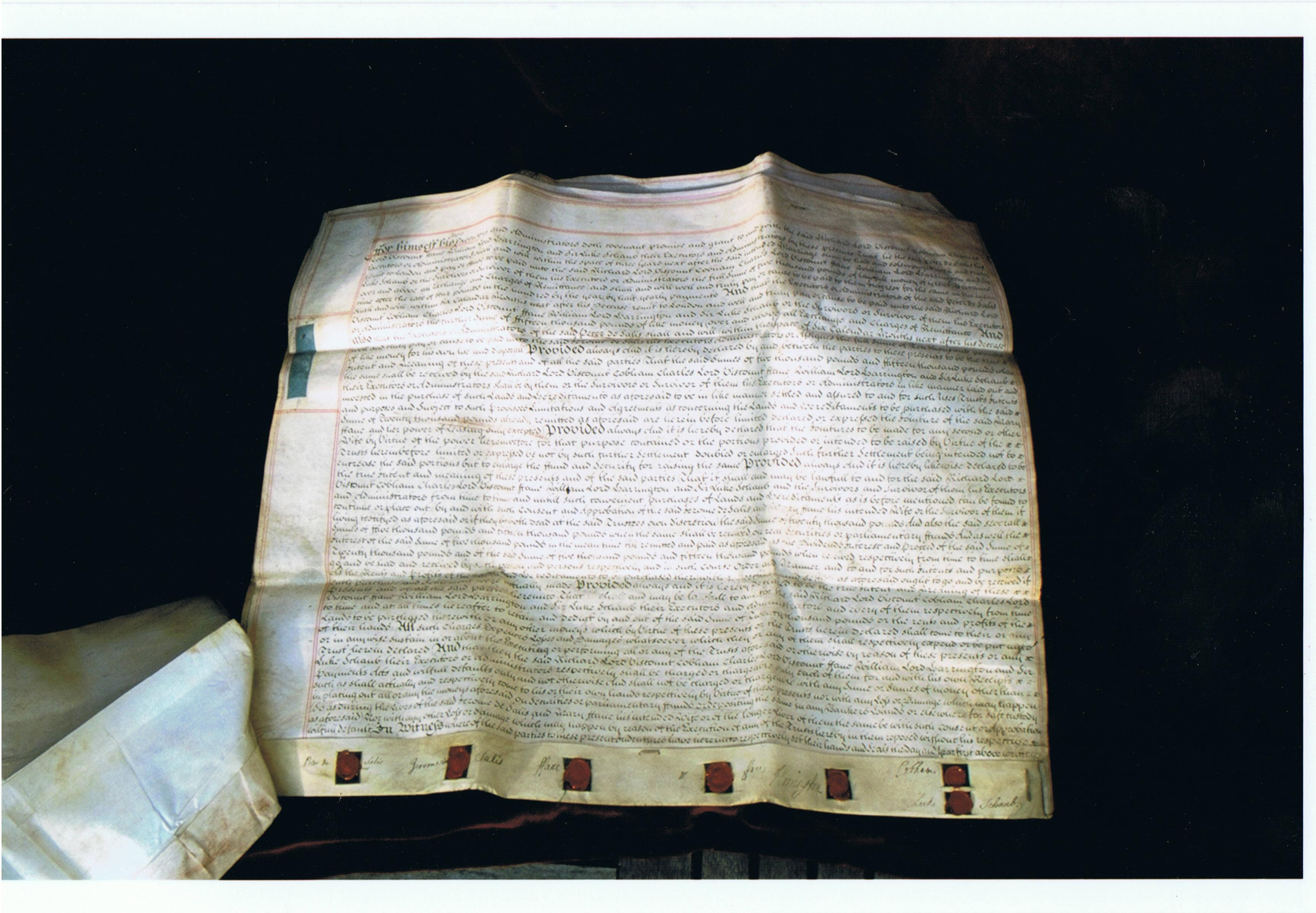
A 1734 marriage contract

- On the table in front of the Earl is a pile of gold and bills of exchange – the bride's dowry just handed to him by the bespectacled alderman, who is scrutinising the marriage contract.
- Between the merchant and the Earl stands an emaciated and threadbare money lender's clerk, who is returning mortgage papers to the Earl with one hand while picking up valuable bills of exchange provided by the merchant as part of the dowry with the other.
- The Earl's son, the Viscount and the future groom, is foppish and effeminate to the last degree and made to look absolutely ridiculous. He has just returned from the Continent and is dressed in the French style, with a giant black bow in his wig and red raised heels to his shoes (Hogarth hated the French, see for example Plate III and The Gate of Calais). He is quite indifferent to the proceedings and has his back to his future wife, and is admiring himself vapidly in the mirror. He has a glittering ring and is taking snuff from his gold snuffbox. The device of looking into a mirror is a double indication that the heir is both vain and narcissistic.
- The mirror in which the Viscount is admiring himself is cut in two vertically by the painting's edge. This is a Hogarth device to indicate that the Viscount is only "half a man". Although indistinct in the painting, in the engraving it is clear that the reflection in this mirror is of Silvertongue and not of the Viscount.
- The Viscount's health is clearly unsound; his legs are spindly and weak, while the black patch on his neck is a sign of syphilis.
- The bride is plainly dressed and looks bored, discontent and resigned to her fate. She is listlessly fidgeting with her wedding ring, which she has threaded on her handkerchief. She has as much interest in the Viscount as he has in her.
- Silvertongue, the lawyer, is sharpening a quill and ingratiating himself with the bride by way of a whispered conversation. Silvertongue's name is not revealed until the final scene.
- The forced, ill-matched and loveless marriage is mirrored bluntly by the bitch and dog chained together and equally uninterested in each other. In both cases the only thing the perpetrators care about is the issue of the consummation.
- The room is filled with evidence and forewarnings of the Earl's nature and the result of the marriage. The painting to the left of the window shows the Earl as a young Jupiter, surrounded by pictorial references to warfare. Jupiter is the Roman god of oaths and treaties and so Hogarth uses this as a deliberate irony as the portrait shows the Earl looking away from the proceedings right under his frame.
  - The portrait is filled with impossible or ridiculous details that prove the artist's incompetence or flattering nature and the Earl's vanity or stupidity in accepting it: the young Earl is shown wearing the Burgundian – Spanish Order of the Golden Fleece, which no non-royal Englishman had ever been awarded at that date. A cannon that the Earl appears to be sitting on, indecorously fires grape shot. The painting is rife with other contradictions: the wind is blowing the clothes one way but the Earl's wig the other; and one hand holds pagan symbols while the other a Christian emblem. In the top corner is a zephyr puffing the wind. Hogarth disliked such cherubs and is recorded as saying, "...an infant's head about two years old with a pair of duck's wings placed under its chin, supposed always to be flying about singing psalms." (See Credulity, Superstition and Fanaticism)
- The other paintings on the walls all are of catastrophe, disaster or martyrdom:
  - Left hand wall, top left: St. Agnes is stabbed to death (Most closely resembles the work by Zampieri Domenico)
  - Left hand wall, bottom left: St. Lawrence is burned to death on the gridiron.
  - Left hand wall, centre oval: immediately above the bride and groom a Gorgon's head observes the scene and screams from an oval frame (as if even she is horrified by the scene before her). Normally the candlesticks would be to either side of the frame, but to heighten the absurdity they are central and therefore block a clear view of the Gorgon's face. This work may be Caravaggio's Medusa.
  - Left hand wall, top right: the Massacre of the Innocents by Peter Paul Rubens.
  - Left hand wall, bottom right: David Kills Goliath also by Rubens.
  - Right hand wall, top: Cain slays Abel.
  - Right hand wall, bottom left: St. Sebastian is shot.
  - Right hand wall, bottom right: Judith decapitates Holofernes.
- On the ceiling the Red Sea closes over the Pharaoh's armies.

== Commentary ==
- Lichtenberg sees the painting of the Red Sea on the ceiling as a symbol of the illogic of the Earl, such as his beginning a new building without ascertaining if he can afford it.

== See also ==
- List of works by William Hogarth
- Marriage A-la-Mode: 2. The Tête à Tête
- Marriage A-la-Mode: 3. The Inspection
- Marriage A-la-Mode: 4. The Toilette
- Marriage A-la-Mode: 5. The Bagnio
- Marriage A-la-Mode: 6. The Lady's Death
