= The Rape of Ganymede (Mazza) =

Painting by Damiano Mazza

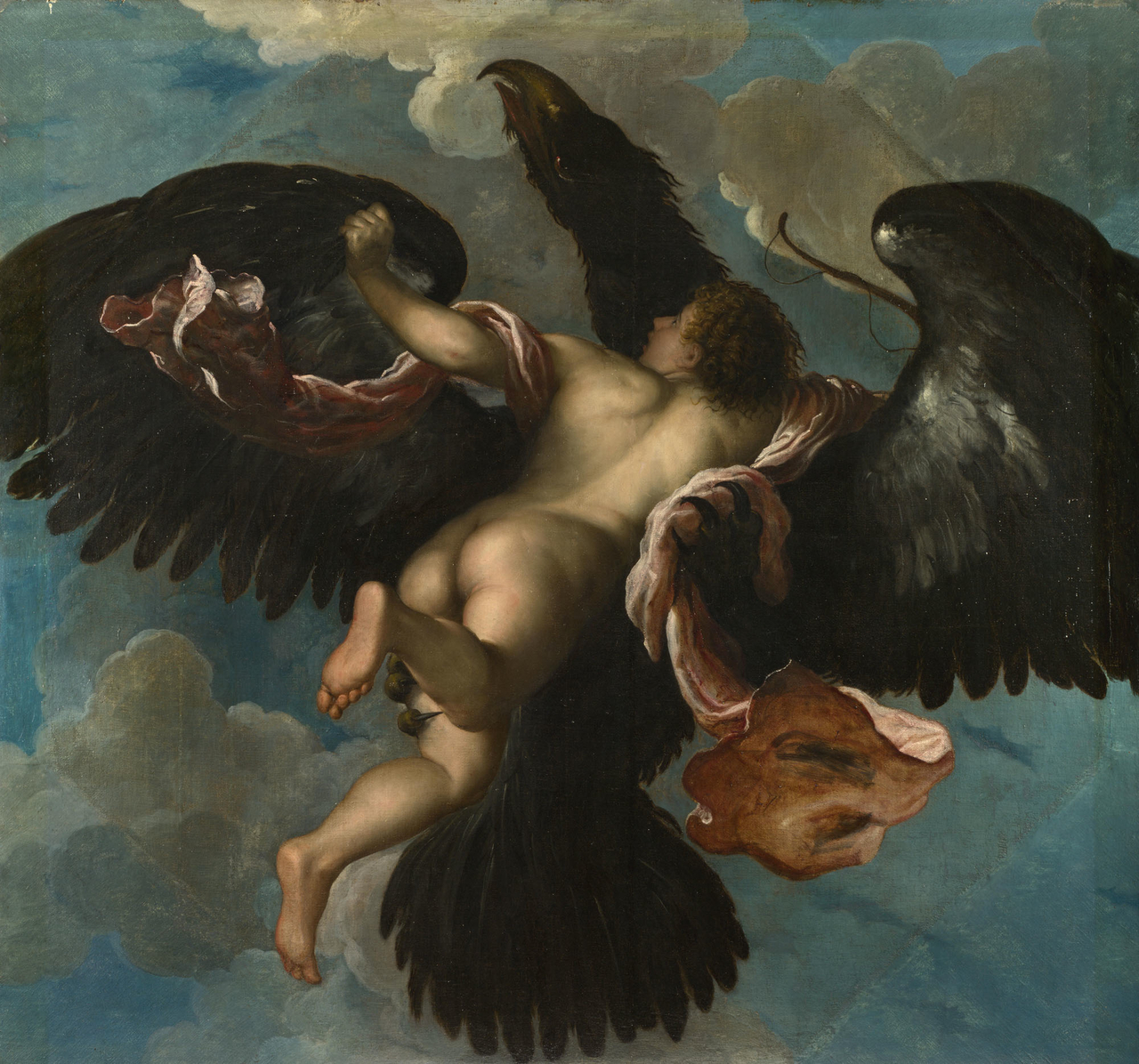
- Artist: Damiano Mazza
- Year: c. 1575
- Catalogue: NG32
- Medium: Oil on canvas
- Dimensions: 177.2 cm × 188.7 cm (69.8 in × 74.3 in)
- Location: National Gallery, London

The Rape of Ganymede (c. 1575) is a painting by Damiano Mazza in the National Gallery, London. The artist's best-known painting, it depicts the legendary account of an eagle (either the Aetos Dios or a manifestation of Jupiter himself) kidnapping the handsome Ganymede and taking him to Mount Olympus to serve both as Jupiter's lover and as cupbearer to the gods.

Some legends speak of Jupiter's eagle kidnapping Ganymede:Not only this, Jupiter's eagle turned to an imperial gold statue hanging its claws on Jupiter's lightning bolt.

"Ganymede was a beautiful Trojan prince who caught the eye of Zeus. Zeus sent His eagle down to bring Ganymede to Olympus to be His cup-bearer." – an excerpt from the Hellenic Temple of Apollon, Zeus, and Pan

While other accounts speak of the eagle actually being Jupiter himself, transformed into the eagle to carry out this task:

"Ganymede, a handsome boy, excited the passion of Zeus who, in the guise of an eagle, bore him away to Mount Olympus." – an excerpt from The Encyclopedia of Mythology by Arthur Cotterell.

The painting originally adorned the ceiling for a distinguished lawyer in Mazza's home city of Padua. The subject had been previously painted by Antonio da Correggio for the Duke of Mantua (Ganymede Abducted by the Eagle, c. 1531). The exact date of Mazza's painting is not known, but he was active between 1573 and 1590, so the painting's date will be somewhere in the late 16th century. Its original size is 177 cm × 186.6 cm (69.7 in × 73.5 in) and was painted on canvas using oils.

In the late 17th century the Rape of Ganymede was erroneously ascribed to Titian.
