= Marriage A-la-Mode (Hogarth) =

Series of six paintings by William Hogarth

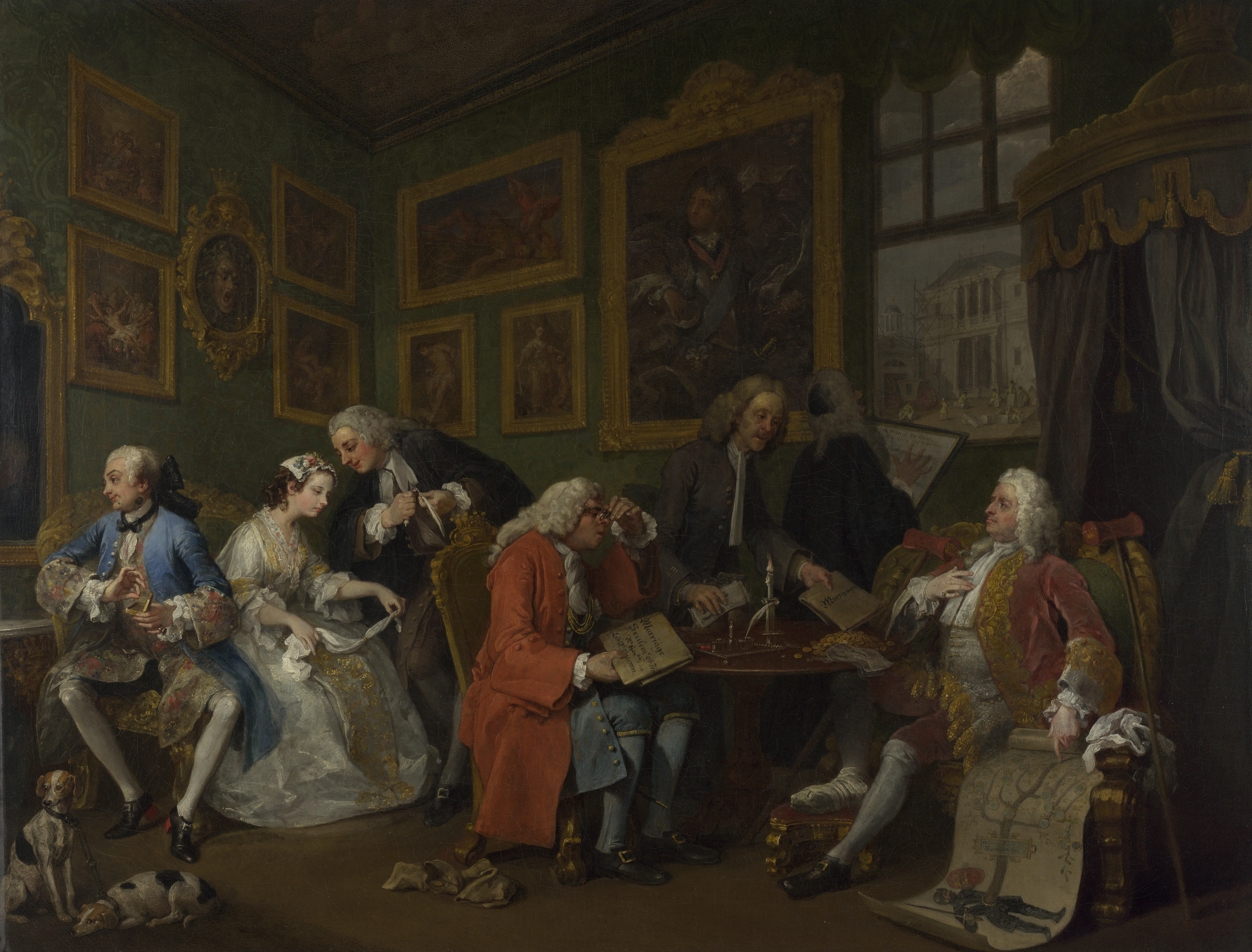
1. The Marriage Settlement

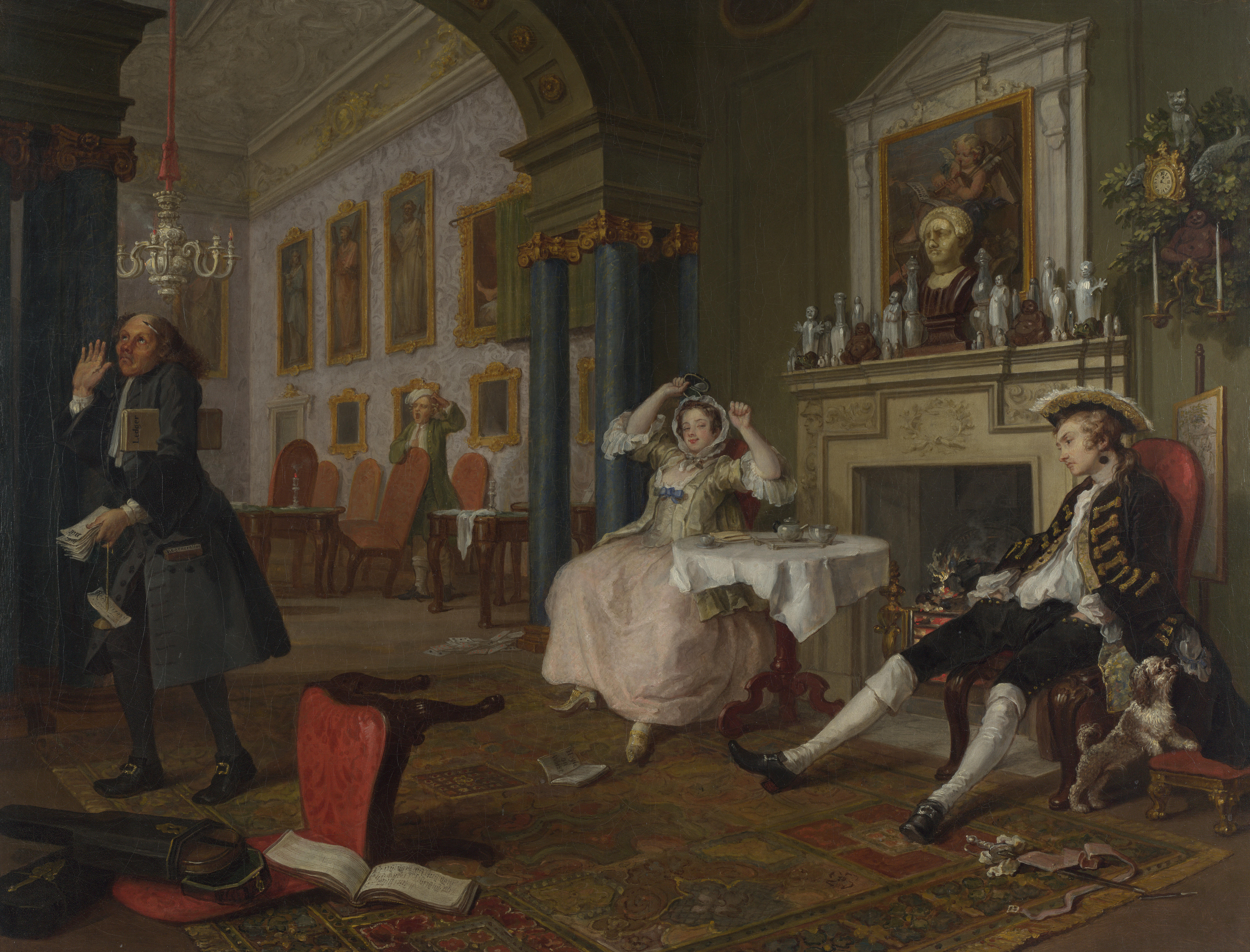
2. The Tête à Tête

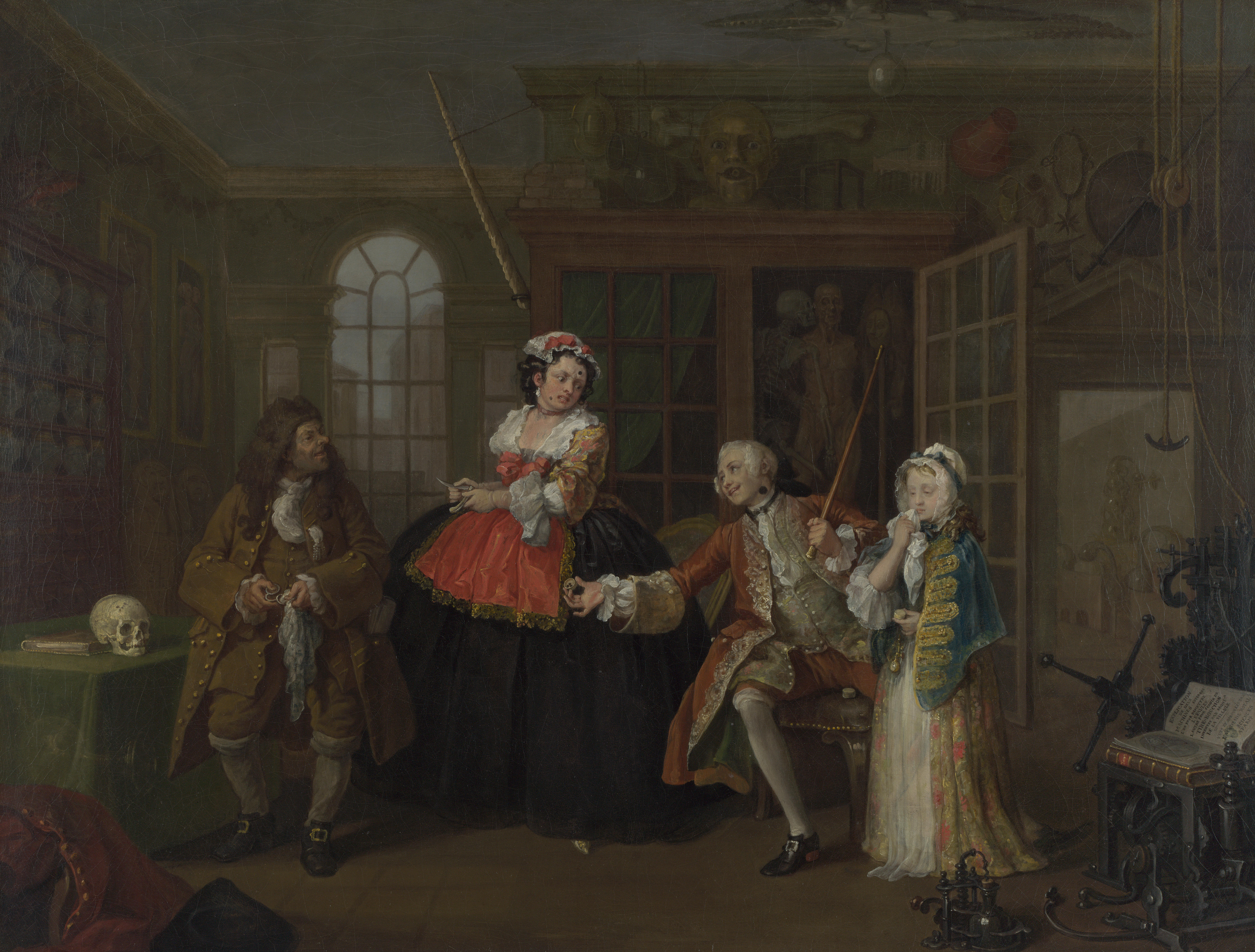
3. The Inspection

4. The Toilette

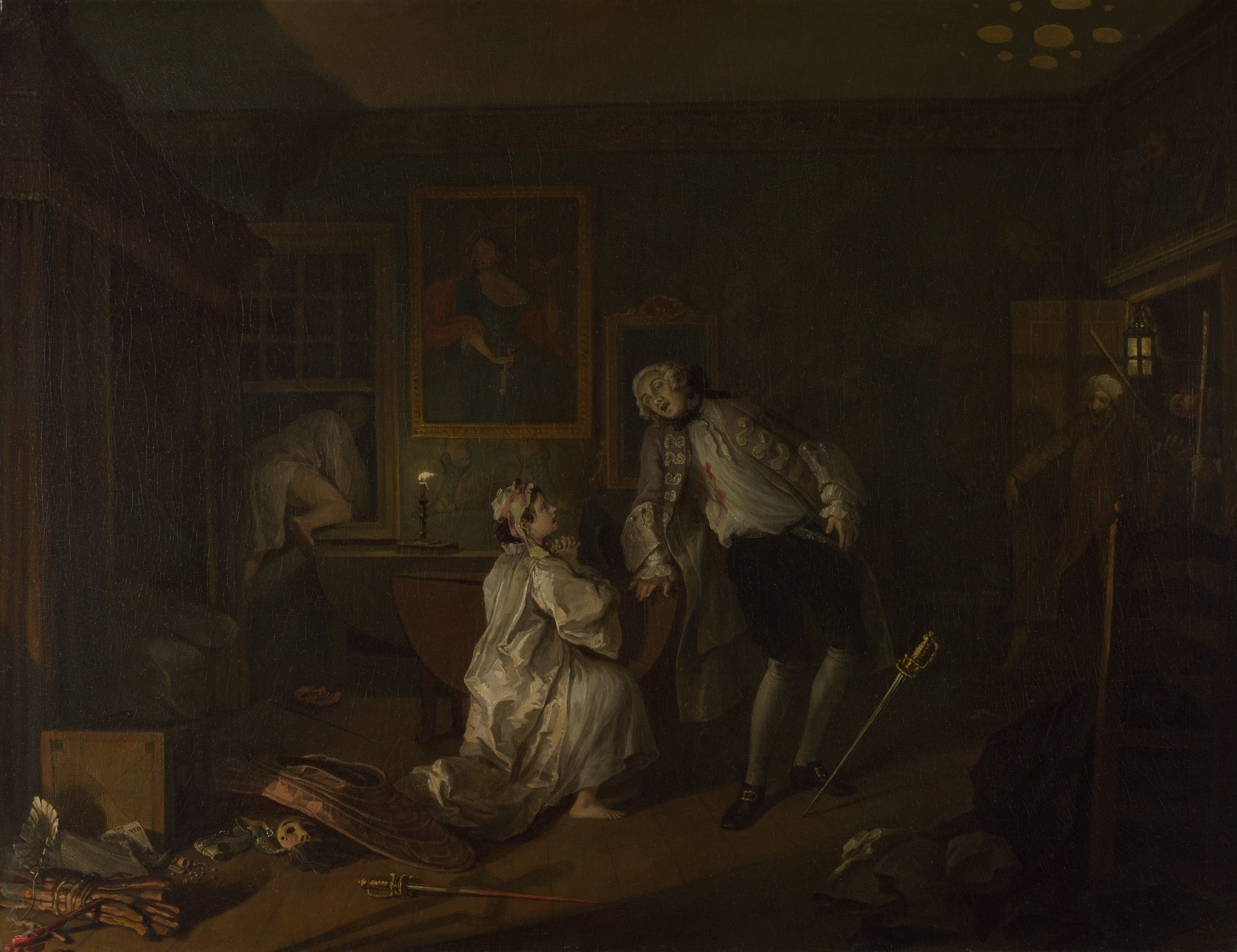
5. The Bagnio

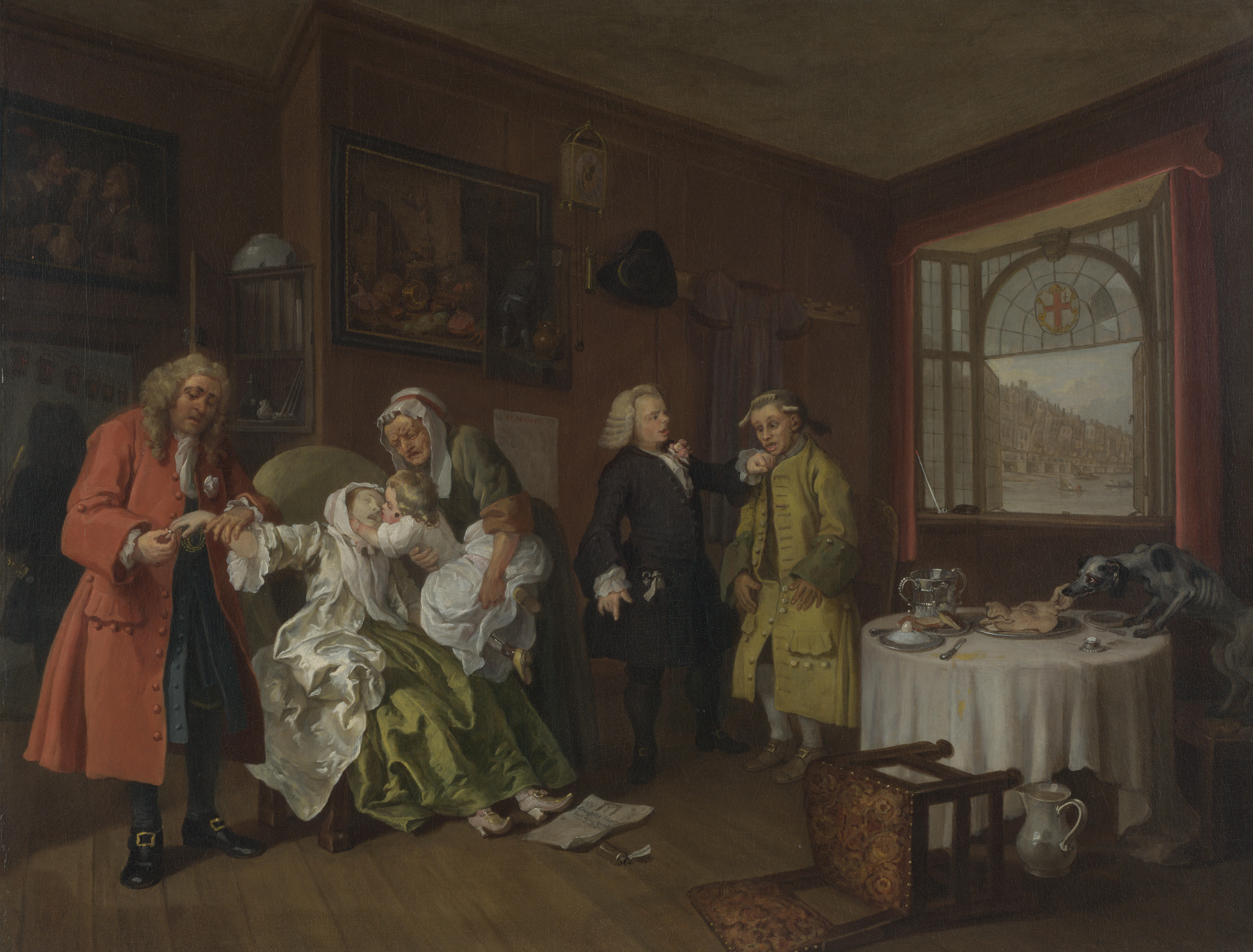
6. The Lady's Death

Marriage A-la-Mode (Note: Spelled Marriage A-la-mode by Hogarth himself according to Robert L. S. Cowley. Cowley writes the following about the names of the paintings given by Hogarth and the names later written on their frames: Hogarth's titles are marginally more expressive and less informative than the later ones.) is a series of six pictures painted by William Hogarth between 1743 and 1745, intended as a pointed skewering of 18th-century society. They show the disastrous results of an ill-considered marriage for money or social status, and satirize patronage and aesthetics. The pictures are held in the National Gallery in London.

This series was not received as well as his other moral tales, A Harlot's Progress (1732) and A Rake's Progress (1735), and when the paintings were finally sold in 1751, it was for a much lower sum than the artist had hoped for.

== Overview ==
In Marriage A-la-Mode Hogarth challenges the traditional view that the nobility and the rich live virtuous lives, and satirises arranged marriages. In each piece, he shows the young couple and their family and acquaintances at their worst: engaging in affairs, drinking, gambling, and numerous other vices. This is regarded by some as his finest project, and the best example of his serially-planned story cycles.

- In the first of the series, The Marriage Settlement (the name on its frame: The marriage contract), he shows an arranged marriage between the son of bankrupt Earl Squanderfield and the daughter of a wealthy but miserly city merchant. Construction on the Earl's new mansion, visible through the window, has stopped, and a usurer negotiates payment for further construction at the centre table. The gouty Earl proudly points to a picture of his family tree, originating with William the Conqueror. The son views himself in a mirror, showing where his interests in the matter lie. His neck features a black patch that may conceal a syphilitic sore. The distraught merchant's daughter is consoled by the lawyer Silvertongue. A handkerchief to dry her tears is threaded through her wedding ring. Even the faces on the walls appear to have misgivings. Two dogs chained to each other in the corner mirror the situation of the young couple.
- In the second, The Tête à Tête (the name on its frame: Shortly after the marriage), there are signs that the marriage has already begun to break down. The husband and wife appear uninterested in one another, amidst evidence of their separate dalliances the previous night. A small dog finds a lady's cap in the husband's coat pocket, indicating his adultery. A broken sword at his feet shows that he has been in a fight. The posture of the wife also indicates unfaithfulness. As Hogarth once noted: "A lock of hair falling thus cross the temples ... has an effect too alluring to be strictly decent, as is very well known to the loose and lowest class of women." The disarray of the house and the servant holding a stack of unpaid bills shows that the affairs of the household are a mess.
- The third in the series, The Inspection (the name on its frame: The visit to the quack doctor), shows the viscount (the earl's son) visiting a quack with a young prostitute. According to one interpretation, the viscount, unhappy with the mercury pills meant to cure his syphilis, demands a refund while the young prostitute next to him dabs an open sore on her mouth, an early sign of syphilis. But according to the analysis of Judy Egerton, the curator of the National Gallery's exhibition, the correct interpretation is very different, and perhaps even darker: The viscount has brought the child to the doctor because he believes he has infected her with syphilis. The woman with the knife is the girl's mother, feigning anger in order to blackmail the viscount, who is being set up. The child already had the disease when her mother sold her to him, either because he was not her first "protector" or because she inherited the illness from her syphilitic father, who is the quack doctor. The identity of the angry woman is, however, disputed, with some arguing that she is the quack's assistant, and others claiming she is a madam. In the bottom right corner of the painting lies an open book, reading: Explication de deux machines superbes l'un pour remettre l'epaules l'autre pour servir de tire bouchon inventes par Monsr de La Pillule. Vues et aprouvées par l'Academie Royal des Sciences a Paris, or, in English, "Explanation of two super machines, one to put back shoulders, the other to serve as corkscrew, invented by M. de La Pillule (Mr. Pill), seen and approved by the Royal Academy of Sciences in Paris." This is a fictional page in a real series of publications put out by the academy.
- In the fourth, The Toilette (the name on its frame: The countess’s morning levee), the old earl has died, so the son is now the new earl and his wife is the countess. The countess sits with her back to her guests, oblivious to them, as a servant attends to her toilette. The lawyer Silvertongue from the first painting is reclining next to the countess, suggesting the existence of an affair. This point is underlined by the child in front of the pair, pointing to the horns on the statue of Actaeon, a symbol of cuckoldry. Paintings in the background include the biblical story of Lot and his daughters, Jupiter and Io, and the rape of Ganymede., the latter painting possibly alluding to the sexual preferences of Frederick the Great, who may be depicted as the flautist in front of this picture. The Actaeon and several other figurines are seen marked for auction. Such paintings depict the Africans present as dressed in European style and fashion, contrasting popular depictions of Africa in Europe as being inhabited by "doll worshippers and hunters".
- In the fifth painting, The Bagnio (the name on its frame: The killing of the earl), the new earl has caught his wife in a bagnio with her lover, the lawyer, and is fatally wounded. As she begs forgiveness from her stricken husband, the murderer lawyer in his nightshirt makes a hasty exit through the window. A picture of a woman with a squirrel on her hand hanging behind the countess contains lewd undertones. Masks on the floor indicate that the couple have been at a masquerade.
- Finally, in the sixth painting, The Lady's Death (the name on its frame: The suicide of the countess), the countess poisons herself in her grief and poverty-stricken widowhood, after her lover is hanged at Tyburn for murdering her husband. An old woman carrying her baby allows the child to give her a kiss, but the mark on the child's cheek and the caliper on her leg suggest that disease has been passed onto the next generation. The countess's father, whose miserly lifestyle is evident in the bare house, removes the wedding ring, the only valuable possession his late daughter has left, from her finger.

These pictures were at first poorly received by the public, to the great disappointment of the artist. He sold them to a Mr. Lane of Hillington for one hundred and twenty guineas. The frames alone had cost Hogarth four guineas each, so his initial remuneration for painting this valuable series was only sixteen shillings over a hundred pounds. After Lane's death they became the property of his nephew, Colonel Cawthorn. In May 1796 they were sold by auction at Christie's, Pall Mall for one thousand guineas to John Julius Angerstein. They are now owned by the British government and are part of the collection of the National Gallery.

It had been Hogarth's intention to follow the Marriage A-la-Mode series with a companion series called The Happy Marriage, but that series only exists as a series of unfinished sketches.

== Technical commentary ==
External videos
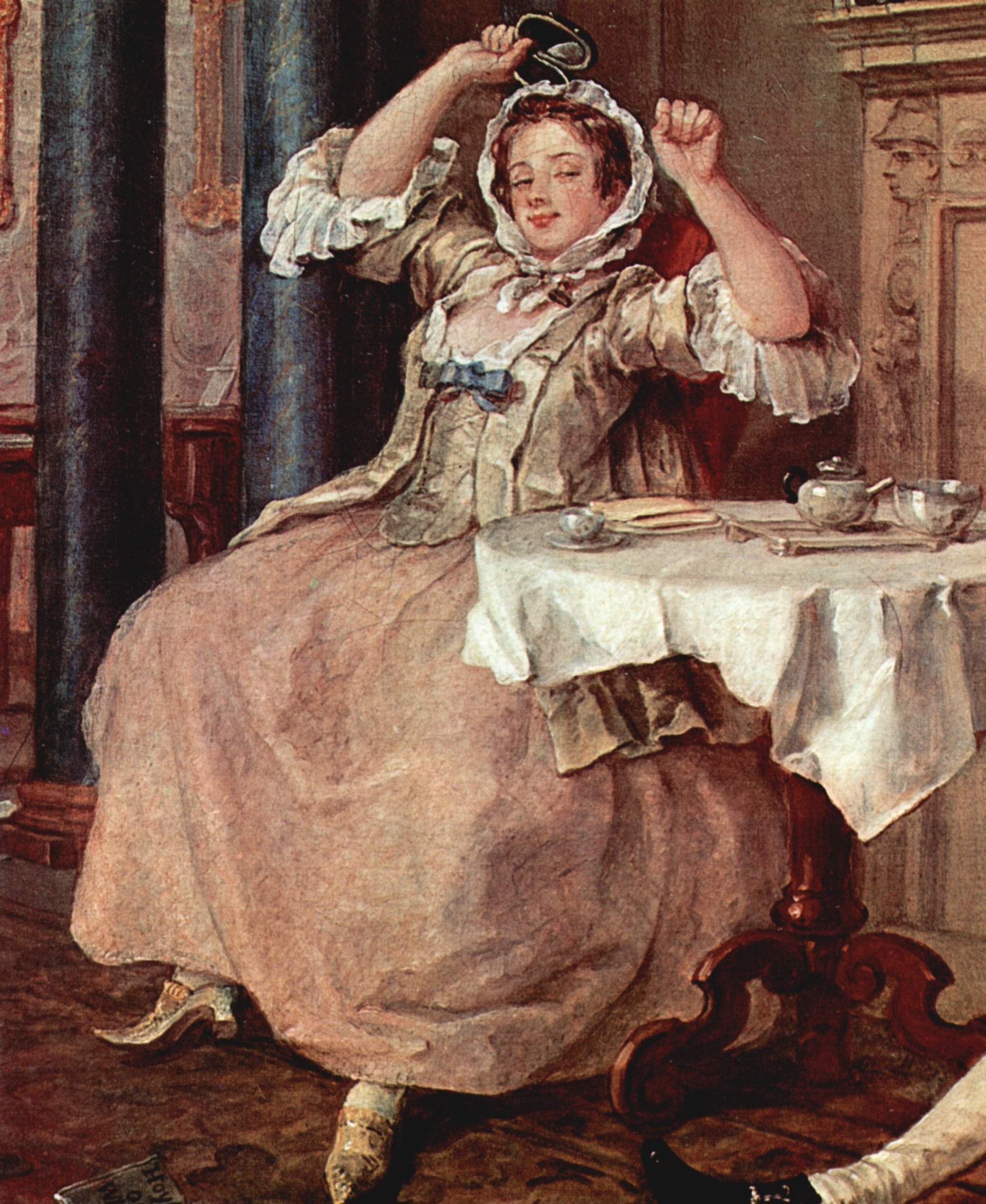
- William Hogarth's Marriage A-la-Mode, c. 1743, Smarthistory

Although this series of paintings are works of art in their own right, their original purpose was to provide the subjects for the series of engraved copper plate prints. When engraving copper plates the image engraved on the plate is a mirror image of the final print. Normally, when undertaking paintings that are to be engraved, the painting is produced the "right way round" — not reversed, and then the engraver views it in a mirror as he undertakes the engraving. Hogarth was an engraver himself and disliked this method, so, unusually, he produced the paintings for Marriage à-la-mode already reversed so the engraver could directly copy them.

Images are read from left to right, and Hogarth would have taken this into account when composing the original paintings.

== Naming ==
Commentators have used a variety of names for the individual paintings, but as the paintings are presently in the National Gallery the names used there are used here.

== See also ==
- List of works by William Hogarth
- The Clandestine Marriage, a 1766 play inspired by Hogarth's series.
