= Marriage A-la-Mode: 3. The Inspection =

Painting by William Hogarth

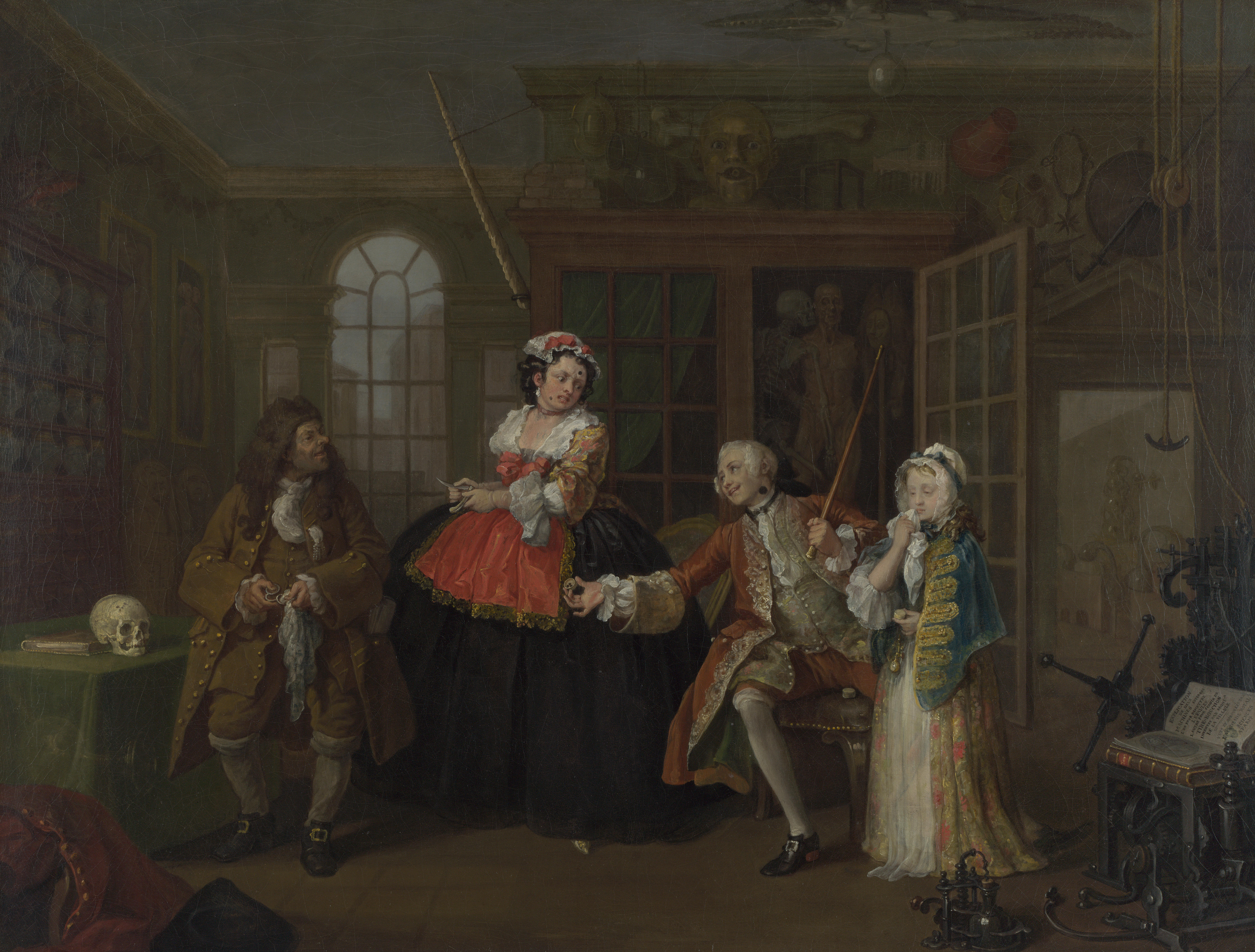
- Artist: William Hogarth
- Year: 1743
- Medium: Oil on canvas
- Dimensions: 69.9 cm × 90.8 cm (27.5 in × 35.7 in)
- Location: National Gallery; London

The Inspection is the third canvas in the series of six satirical paintings known as Marriage à-la-mode by William Hogarth.

The viscount, suffering from syphilis, makes a visit to a French doctor.

== Details ==
- A black patch on the viscount's neck is Hogarth's device for signifying the Viscount is suffering from syphilis.
- The French doctor is based upon Dr. Rock (who can also be seen in A Harlot's Progress). His surgery was at 96, St. Martins Lane, Westminster, London.
- The taller woman is opening a clasp knife and is turning away from the viscount whom she clearly dislikes. Commentators variously identify her as the child's mother, the doctor's assistant or another prostitute. According to one interpretation, if she were the child's mother, Hogarth would have almost certainly placed mother and child together. But according to the analysis of Judy Egerton, the curator of the National Gallery's exhibition, the interpretation is very different: The viscount has brought the child to the doctor because he believes he has infected her with syphilis. The woman with the knife is the girl's mother, feigning anger in order to blackmail the viscount, who is being set up. The child already had the disease when her mother sold her to him, either because he was not her first "protector" or because she inherited the illness from her syphilitic father, who is the quack doctor.
- The cabinet on the left has shelves crammed with apothecary's pots and a wolf's head on the top. On the left wall are two paintings of monsters: one is a man with his head below his shoulders underneath two mummies, and the other of a two headed hermaphrodite.
- The cabinet against the rear wall has a door ajar, revealing a skeleton suggestively leaning against an embalmed body. There is also a long wig on a plaster head.
- Fixed to the wall and on top of the cabinet, from left to right, there are: a narwal tusk (a classic phallic symbol), a pile of pill boxes, a bleeding basin (identified because of its scalloped side), a glass urinal, a giant plaster head with a huge femur behind, an alchemist's tripod for holding flasks over burners (or a gallows tree), a broken mediaevial comb, a tall red Jacobean hat, two mismatched mediaeval shoes, a spur buckler and a sword and shield.
- On the ceiling is a stuffed crocodile with a large ostrich egg hanging from it.
- The extremely complicated mechanical contraptions on the right are identified by the inscription on the open book, as being for setting a dislocated shoulder and drawing corks out of wine bottles. An additional inscription on the book reads, "Inspected and approved by the Royal Academy at Paris", Hogarth emphasising the ignorance of the French and their scant knowledge of medicine.

== Commentary ==
- Georg Christoph Lichtenberg sees the basin, urinal, tripod, hat and spurs as a suggestion that the doctor's career has been barber, quack, near execution, doctor and finally knighthood.

== See also ==
- List of works by William Hogarth
- Marriage A-la-Mode: 1. The Marriage Settlement
- Marriage A-la-Mode: 2. The Tête à Tête
- Marriage A-la-Mode: 4. The Toilette
- Marriage A-la-Mode: 5. The Bagnio
- Marriage A-la-Mode: 6. The Lady's Death
