= Marriage A-la-Mode: 6. The Lady's Death =

Painting by William Hogarth

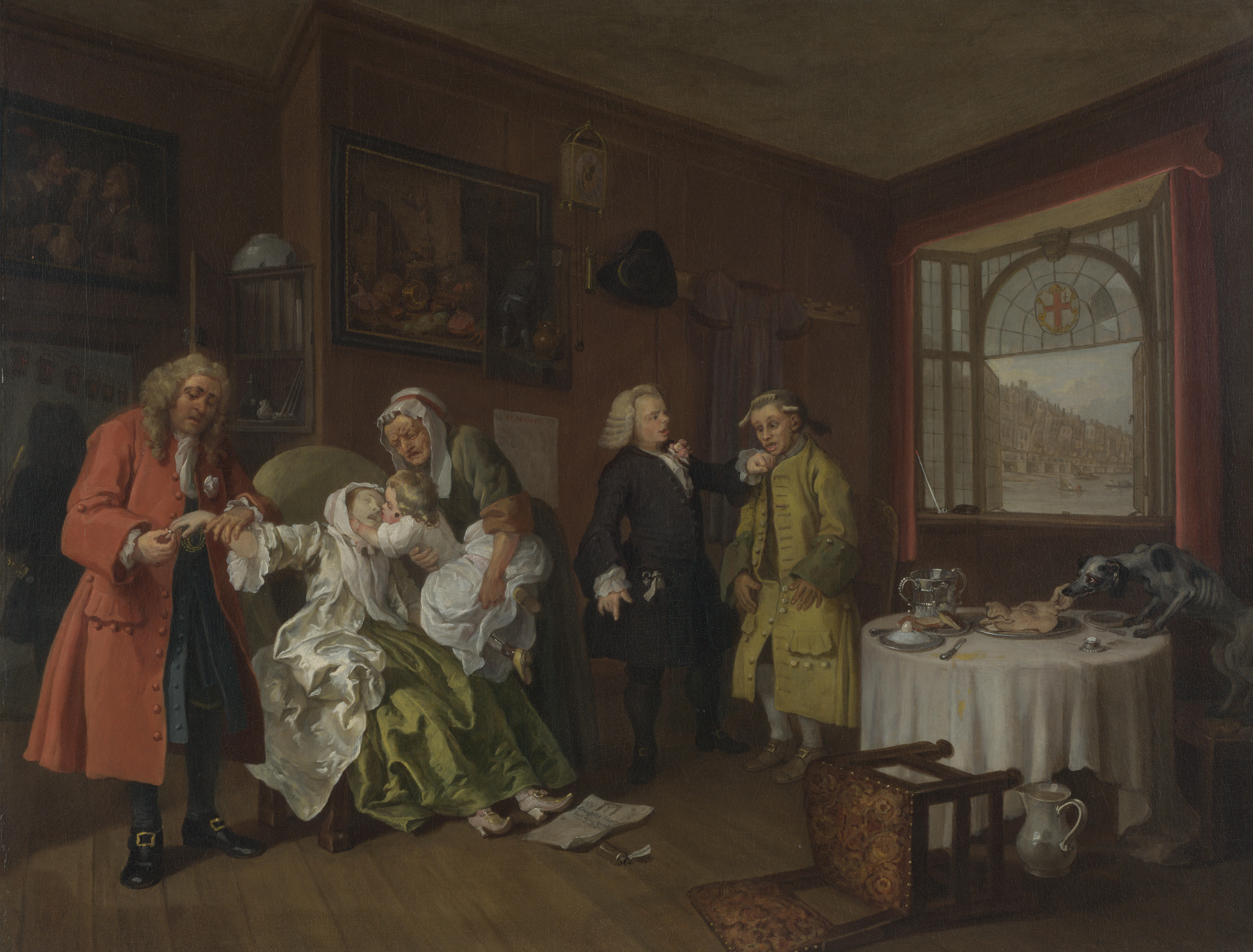
- Artist: William Hogarth
- Year: 1743
- Medium: Oil on canvas
- Dimensions: 69.9 cm × 90.8 cm (27.5 in × 35.7 in)
- Location: National Gallery; London

The Lady's Death is the sixth and final canvas in the series of satirical paintings known as Marriage A-la-Mode painted by William Hogarth.

== Excerpt ==
The Countess has returned to her father's house after her husband’s murder. The moral drama is concluded with her having moved from dissipation and vice to misery and shame, and finally to terminating her existence by suicide after her lover is hanged at Tyburn for murdering her husband.

== Analysis ==
The final scene takes place in the Countess's father's frugally furnished house, in contrast to the old Earl's mansion in the first scene. Torn by guilt and despair after discovering her lover's death, the Countess has taken poison having bribed her father’s dim-witted servant to procure her a dose of laudanum. The empty vial lies on the floor.

The paper on the floor at the feet of the Countess next to the vial is the handbill/broadsheet giving the notice of the execution of Silvertongue — the tripod at the head is the Tyburn Tree — with a report of Silvertongue’s last dying speech from the gallows, the final straw that pushed the Countess to suicide.

The only people showing any sorrow for her death are her daughter and old maidservant.

The child's legs are fitted with calipers, indicating she has rickets (a disorder that contemporary commentators associated with over-indulgence — similar to the old Earl's gout in the first scene — rather than deprivation). The child has a black patch on her neck indicating that she has contracted syphilis from her parents. The patch could also indicate scrofula; in either case a possible indication that the child will not live long after her mother. The congenital handicaps visited upon the child by her parents are compounded by the final irony that as a female, she will not inherit her family titles. The family tree that the old Earl so proudly displays in the first scene has come to an end, totally destroyed by those who were charged with its preservation. Even worse (from her father's perspective), is that, as a suicide, all the property and possessions she inherited from the Earl are now forfeit to the state, causing him to lose his entire dowry — except the ring he removes from her finger before rigor mortis sets in.

The apothecary reprimands the dim-witted servant for having collected the poison for the Countess.

Through the door on the extreme left, behind the father, can be seen the doctor leaving. The leather buckets immediately over the doctor’s head were, previous to the introduction of fire-engines, considered as proper furniture for a merchant’s hall. Every ornament in his parlour — including his clock, a cobweb over the window, repaired chair, even his hat — is highly and exactly appropriate to the father.

The only food on the table is half a pig's head, a deliberately unappetising meal emphasising frugality of the father's household, about to be carried off by an emaciated dog. The pictures on the wall are Dutch low-life scenes and satirise the then current taste for indifferent Dutch genre pictures: a woman lights a pipe using the "heat" from a tipsy man's nose; a still life shows a sinkful of dirty dishes; a drunken man urinates against a wall.

The window incorporates the coat of arms of the City of London (a St George's cross with an up-turned sword in the top corner), indicating that the house is on the north side of the River Thames. The view through the open window is of old London Bridge, famous for the houses built along its length. The view is based upon that from the house of Hogarth's uncle whom he used to visit as a child. The houses were demolished in 1757. This view, with deliberately exaggerated run-down and ramshackle houses on the bridge contrasts to the new stately home being built than can be viewed through the window in the first scene of the series.

The overturned piece of furniture (this time a chair) seen in the foreground is a device often used by Hogarth to indicate disagreement and discordance.

== Sequences ==
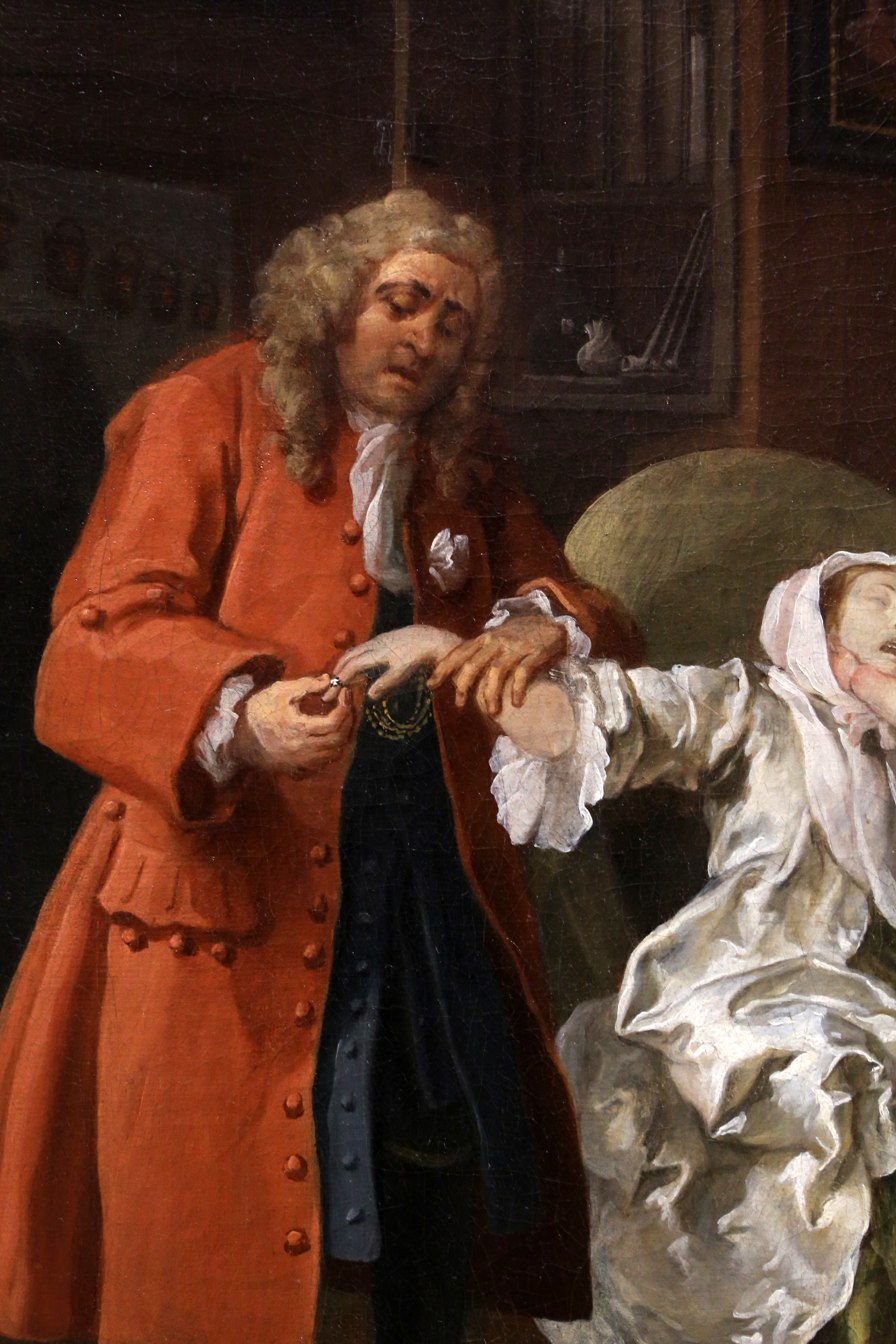
Father removing ring.

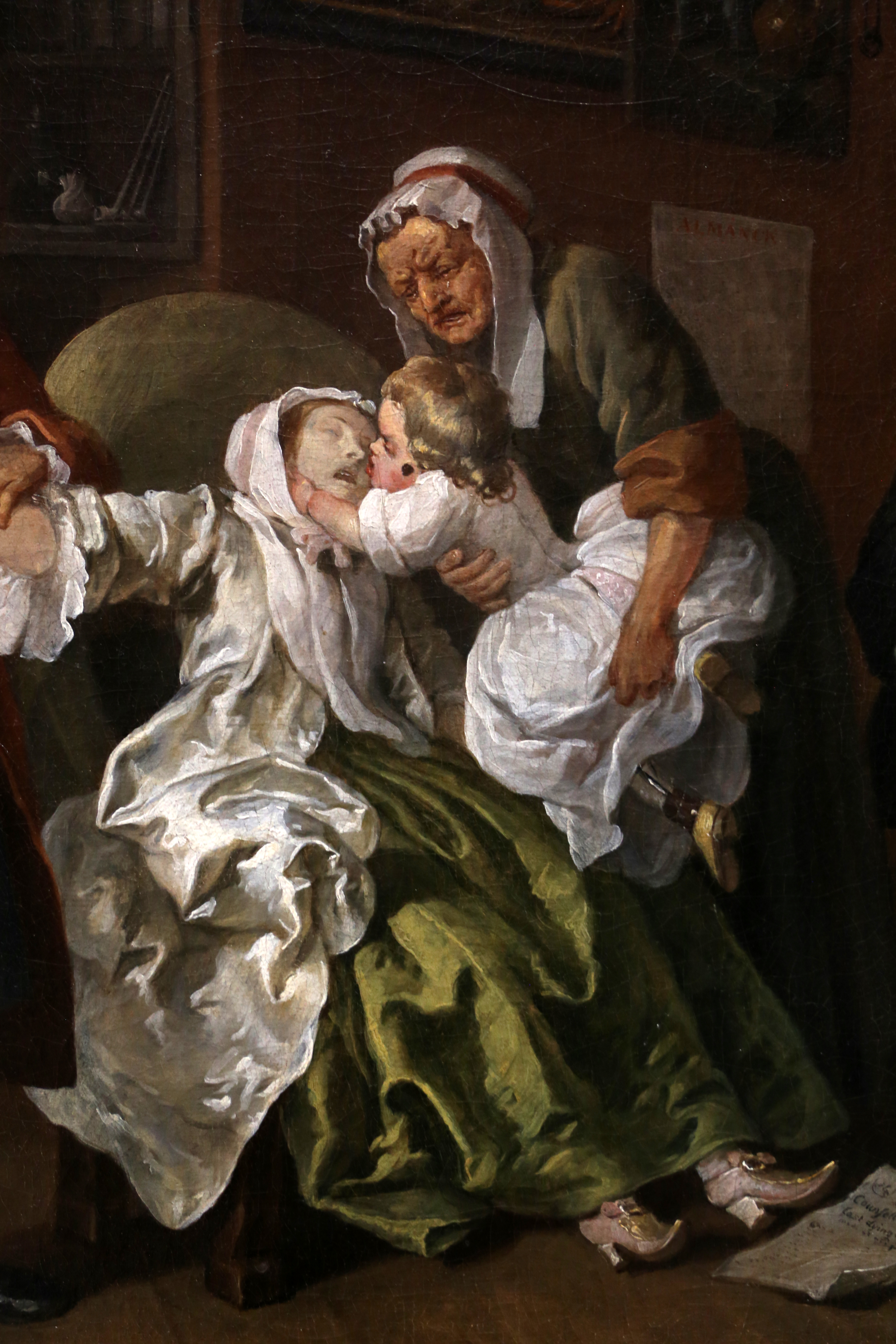
Dying lady, old maidservant, daughter.

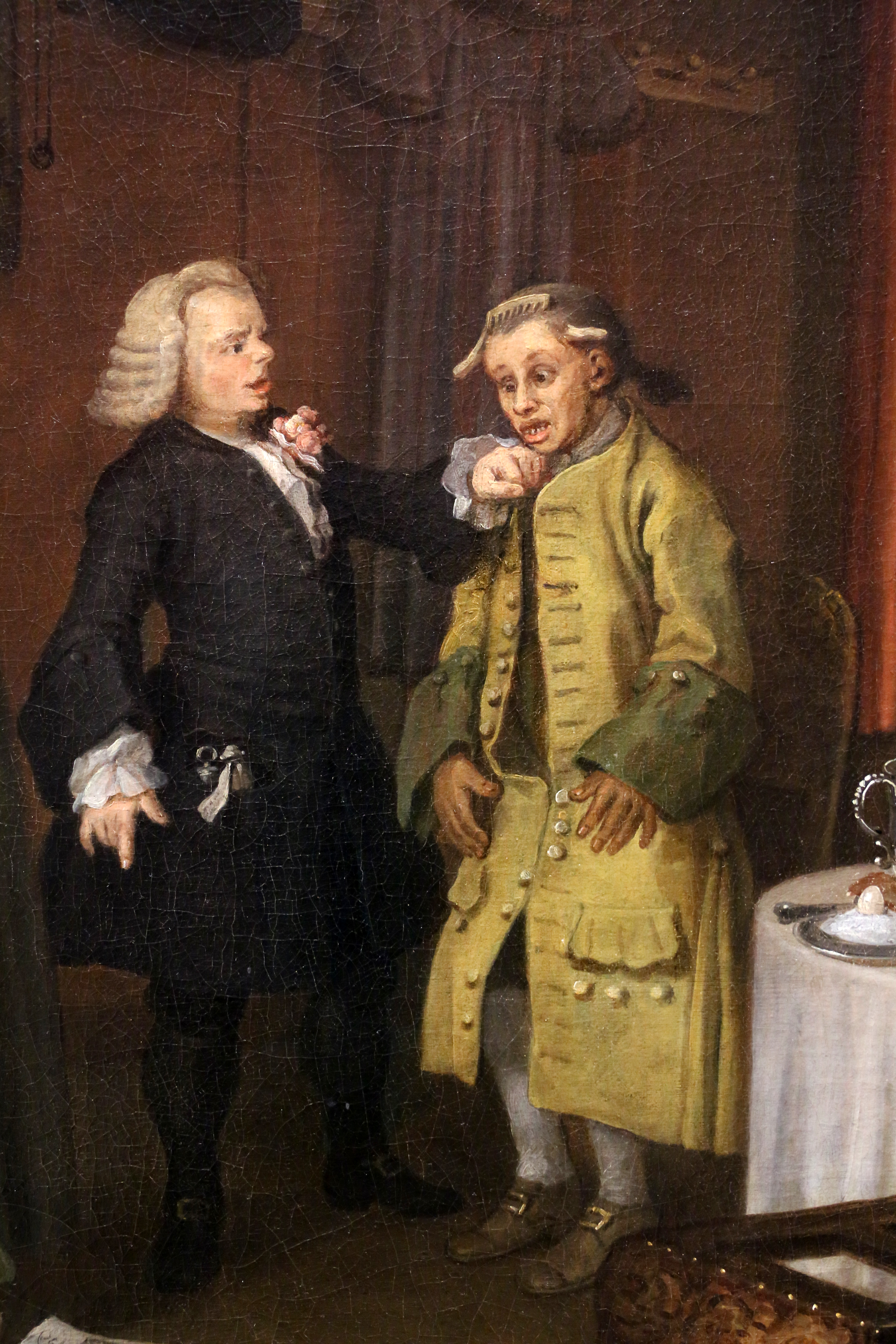
Apothecary and servant.

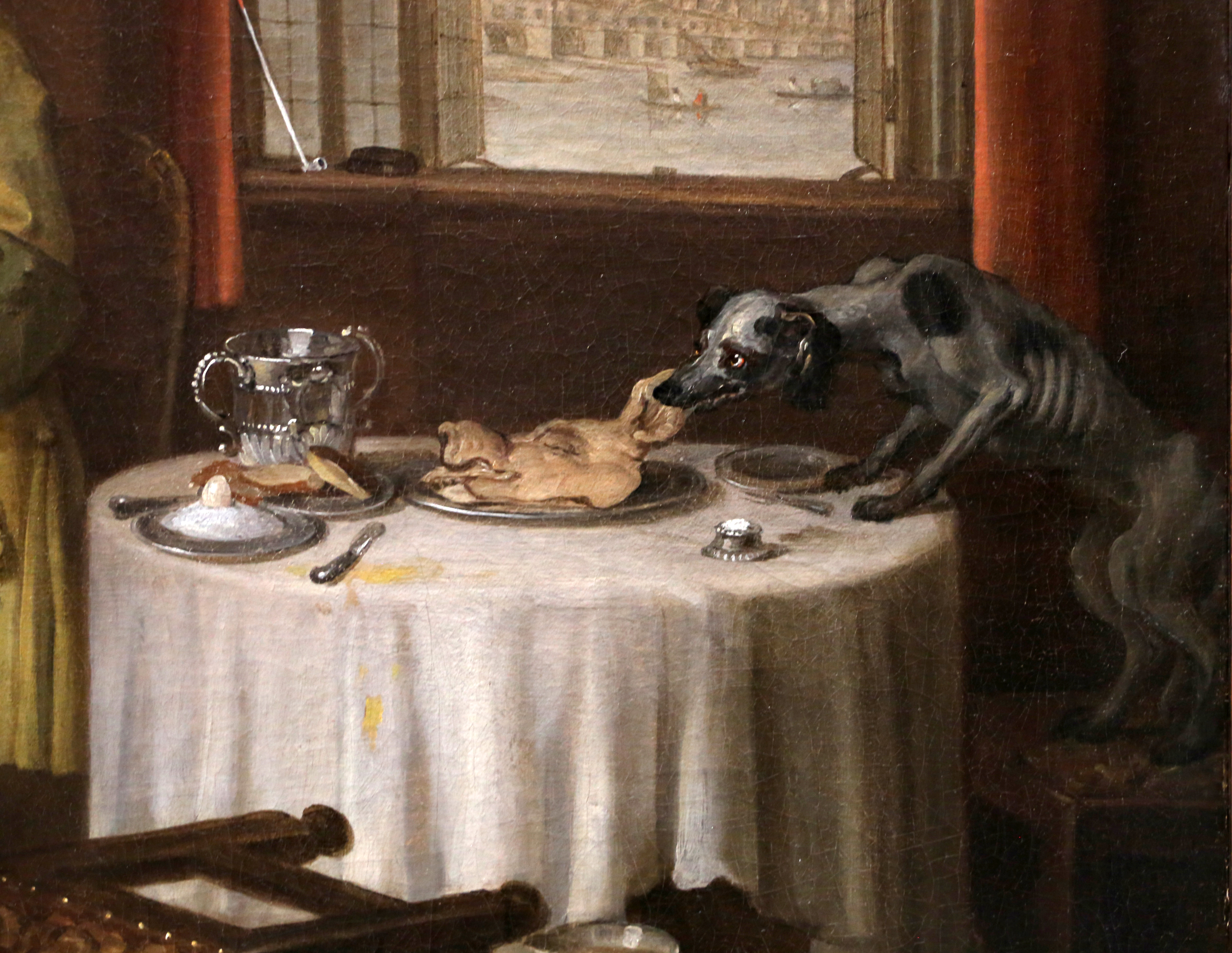
Emaciated dog.

== See also ==
- List of works by William Hogarth
- Marriage A-la-Mode: 1. The Marriage Settlement
- Marriage A-la-Mode: 2. The Tête à Tête
- Marriage A-la-Mode: 3. The Inspection
- Marriage A-la-Mode: 4. The Toilette
- Marriage A-la-Mode: 5. The Bagnio
