= Marriage A-la-Mode: 5. The Bagnio =

Painting by William Hogarth

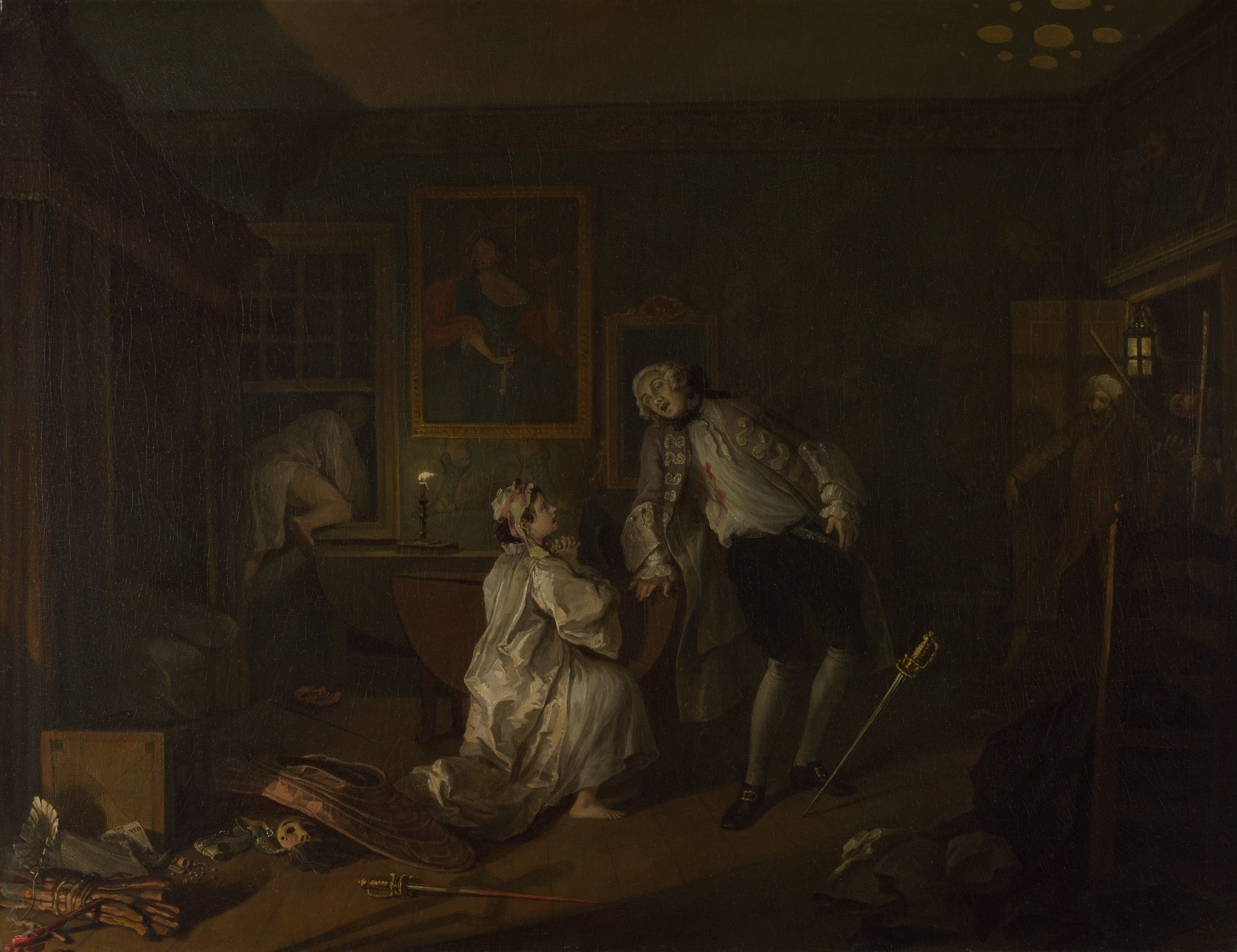
- Artist: William Hogarth
- Year: 1743
- Medium: Oil on canvas
- Dimensions: 69.9 cm × 90.8 cm (27.5 in × 35.7 in)
- Location: National Gallery, London

The Bagnio is the fifth canvas in the series of six satirical paintings known as Marriage A-la-Mode painted by William Hogarth.

The new Earl catches his wife with her lover, Silvertongue, and is fatally wounded by the scoundrel who makes his escape through the window.

This episode takes place in the Turk's Head Bagnio in Bow Street, Covent Garden, identified by a bill on the floor by the upturned table on the left. The Turk's Head actually existed and was kept by a Mrs Earl. "Bagnio" was originally a word used to describe a coffee house which offered Turkish-style baths, but by Hogarth's time it signified a place where rooms could be taken for the night with no questions asked.

== Commentary ==
- The Countess and Silvertongue have retired to the Turk's Head after the masquerade. On the floor can be seen their masques and fancy dress.
- The young Earl has followed them and has clearly burst into the room as the staple of the door lock has been ripped out and thrown onto the floor where it can be seen along with the door key.
- The bed is unmade so clearly the Earl has found the couple in bed.
- Having burst in, the Earl has had a swordfight with Silvertongue. Silvertongue's sword is on the floor in the foreground and can be seen to be very bloody - the Earl has been run through twice and is dying from his wounds.
- Silvertongue took unfair advantage of his opponent, fighting with the light from the fireplace behind him and in the Earl's eyes.
- The Earl's head is framed by the mirror on the back wall, a reference to the first scene where the then young Viscount is seen admiring himself in a mirror.
- The Countess pleads with the Earl for forgiveness.
- Silvertongue is in his nightshirt and is escaping through the window. Hogarth provides a fleeting glimpse of Silvertongue's genitalia to remind the viewer of the ridiculousness of the circumstances of the Countess's plea for forgiveness.
- The noise of the fight has awakened the master of the house who appears through the door to the right with the Watch.
- On the rear wall is a tapestry of the 'Judgment of Solomon' with the child about to be hacked in two, a reference to the inevitable destruction of all the players of this series of paintings.
- The painting on the back wall is of an idealised shepherdess with the face replaced with that of a well-known prostitute. Immediately below this painting is a pair of comic legs belonging to a character in the tapestry behind, but appearing to belong to the shepherdess.
- The painting over the door is of St Luke with his drawing board. Traditionally, St Luke is said to have painted the first religious icons, pictures of the Virgin Mary. The ox is a beast associated with St Luke, and he is classically depicted taking a dictation from an ox.
- The overturned piece of furniture (this time a table) seen in the bottom left corner is a device often used by Hogarth to indicate disagreement and discordance.
- Amongst the wreckage are little drops of mercury, a contemporary treatment for syphilis.

== See also ==
- List of works by William Hogarth
- Marriage A-la-Mode: 1. The Marriage Settlement
- Marriage A-la-Mode: 2. The Tête à Tête
- Marriage A-la-Mode: 3. The Inspection
- Marriage A-la-Mode: 4. The Toilette
- Marriage A-la-Mode: 6. The Lady's Death
