= Fauk =

Fauk or Fauks may refer to:

- Elisabeth Granneman (1930–1992), Norwegian actress, writer and musician
- Isaac Fawkes (or Fauks; 1675–1732), English conjurer and showman
- Defence Judge Advocate Corps (Denmark)

== See also ==
- Fawkes
- FAK (disambiguation)
