= Isaac Fawkes =

English conjurer and showman

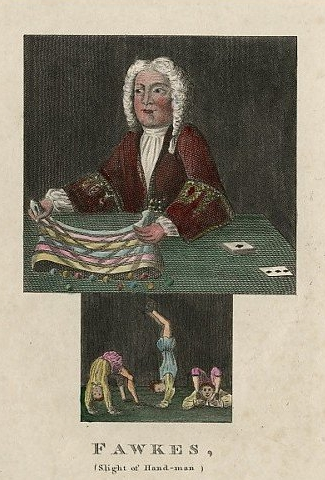
Fawkes, Sleight of Hand-man. This hand-coloured print reproduces details from a souvenir fan probably painted by Thomas Loggon c. 1740. Fawkes is shown performing his famous Egg Bag trick and below his "Posture Master" demonstrates various poses.

Isaac Fawkes (1675?–1732) (also spelt Fawks, Fawxs, Fauks and Faux) was an English conjurer and showman. The first record of Fawkes was an appearance by his son at Southwark Fair in 1722, but an advertisement of April of the same year boasted that he had performed for George II, so it is likely that he was well known in London before this time. He was one of the earliest magicians to present conjuring as an entertainment outside of the traditional fairground setting and by skilful promotion and management of his act he was able to amass both fame and a considerable fortune. His simple entertainment was satirised alongside other popularist amusements by William Hogarth in 1723, but he continued to be patronised by fashionable society until his death in 1732. He formed a close professional relationship with the clock and automata maker Christopher Pinchbeck and from the mid-1720s began to demonstrate Pinchbeck's designs in shows both in their own right and for magical effects in his conjuring act.

== Popularity ==
Nothing is known of Fawkes before early 1722 when an advertisement appeared announcing that his son would give a performance of tumbling at Southwark Fair, but it is safe to suppose that he was well-established as a performer in London by this time, as in March 1722 he took out an advertisement in which he mentioned his previous performances for George II, in which he demonstrated:

Tricks by Dexterity of Hand, with his Cards, Eggs, Corn, Mice, curious India Birds, and Money...Likewize the surprising Activity of Body perform'd by his Little Boy, of 12 Years of Age...

The 12-year-old boy was Fawkes' own son who had been the tumbler at Southwark earlier in the year and became a regular fixture of Fawkes' show as a "Posture Master" or contortionist. In later announcements Fawkes' bragged that his son was the finest Posture Master in Europe. Because of the popularity of the contortionist act he took on another younger boy to perform a similar act but "all different from what his own boy performs". Ricky Jay, who has researched Fawkes, believes that a piece in the Daily Courant from 1711 may refer to Fawkes as it mentions a posture master and many conjuring tricks that later became staples of Fawkes' show.

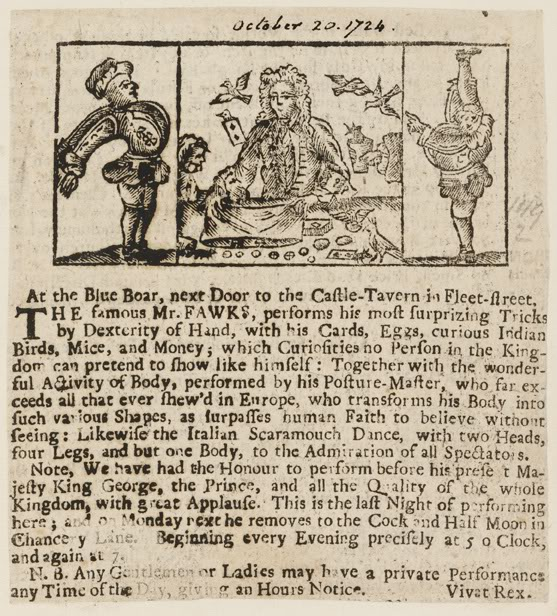
A newspaper advertisement for Fawkes' show from 1724 in which he boasts of the success of his performances for the King and Prince George. The sketch at the top is taken from a broadside image drawn by Sutton Nichols.

Fawkes was not the first fair conjurer and neither was he particularly innovative in his routines (though he did make copious use of the recently invented Egg Bag), but by consciously rejecting the association of conjuring with black magic and mysterious forces and making it clear that his show was not designed to defraud his audience, he was among the first to successfully market his act to fashionable society outside the fairs. Fawkes eschewed the stereotypical voluminous cloak and hat of the traditional fair conjurer and instead presented himself in gentrified dress with a powdered wig and smart suit. His act was squarely presented as entertainment; he emphasised his skills of dexterity and if he did mention the dark forces it was only to mock those of his contemporaries that claimed a connection with the supernatural. The anonymous author of Round About Our Coal Fire or, Christmas Entertainments identified the key to Fawkes' success:

... Mr Fawkes, one of our modern conjurers, who having anointed himself with the Sense of the People, became so great a Conjurer that he amassed several Thousand pounds to himself.

Not everybody was convinced of his honesty though; in his Portraits, memoirs, and characters, of remarkable persons of 1819 the author and publisher James Caulfield sketched Fawkes as a fraudster:

Fawkes whose christian name (if ever he had any) has not been handed down to posterity, made a distinguished figure in the reign of George the First, and, by his slight (sic) of hand, and other ingenious devices, contrived to ease as many fools as he could find, or make, of their pence. (Note: Fawkes' Christian name was forgotten until 1904 when the details of his burial were discovered by Harry Houdini in the records of St. Martin-in-the-Fields.)

Fawkes was a regular at the Southwark and Bartholomew fairs, where he gave up to six shows a day, but his rising popularity allowed him to establish himself in London outside the fair season. Early in 1723 he was working from the Long Room at the French Theatre next to the Opera House, Haymarket, where he gave a performance to the Prince and his retinue and was "handsomely rewarded". By April 1723 he had moved to premises in Upper Moorfields, where he held performances from a large booth three times a day (at three, five and seven o'clock). After the fair season he had a booth at Tower Hill and by December he had moved back to the Haymarket under the same roof as John James Heidegger's masquerades and Handel's operas. He allowed the operas to take precedence and did not perform on Tuesdays and Saturdays, but by setting up alongside the masquerades he had established himself at the hub of the fashionable London entertainments.

He was not embarrassed by his success; late in 1723 a newspaper advertisement appeared boasting of his fame and wealth:

The famous Mr Fawks, as he modestly styles himself, has since Bartholomew and Southwark-Fairs, put seven hundred Pounds into the Bank...

He challenged any of his competitors to prove that they could deposit a similar amount. Fawkes made extravagant use of this sort of self-promotion through newspapers, journals, broadsheets and playbills; he kept the public informed not only of his forthcoming shows but also of his performances for the rich and famous, his successes, and his developing career. He also employed a flexible pricing structure for his entertainments: the entrance fees for his shows varied between sixpence and two shillings depending on the audience and the location.

== Hogarth's satires ==
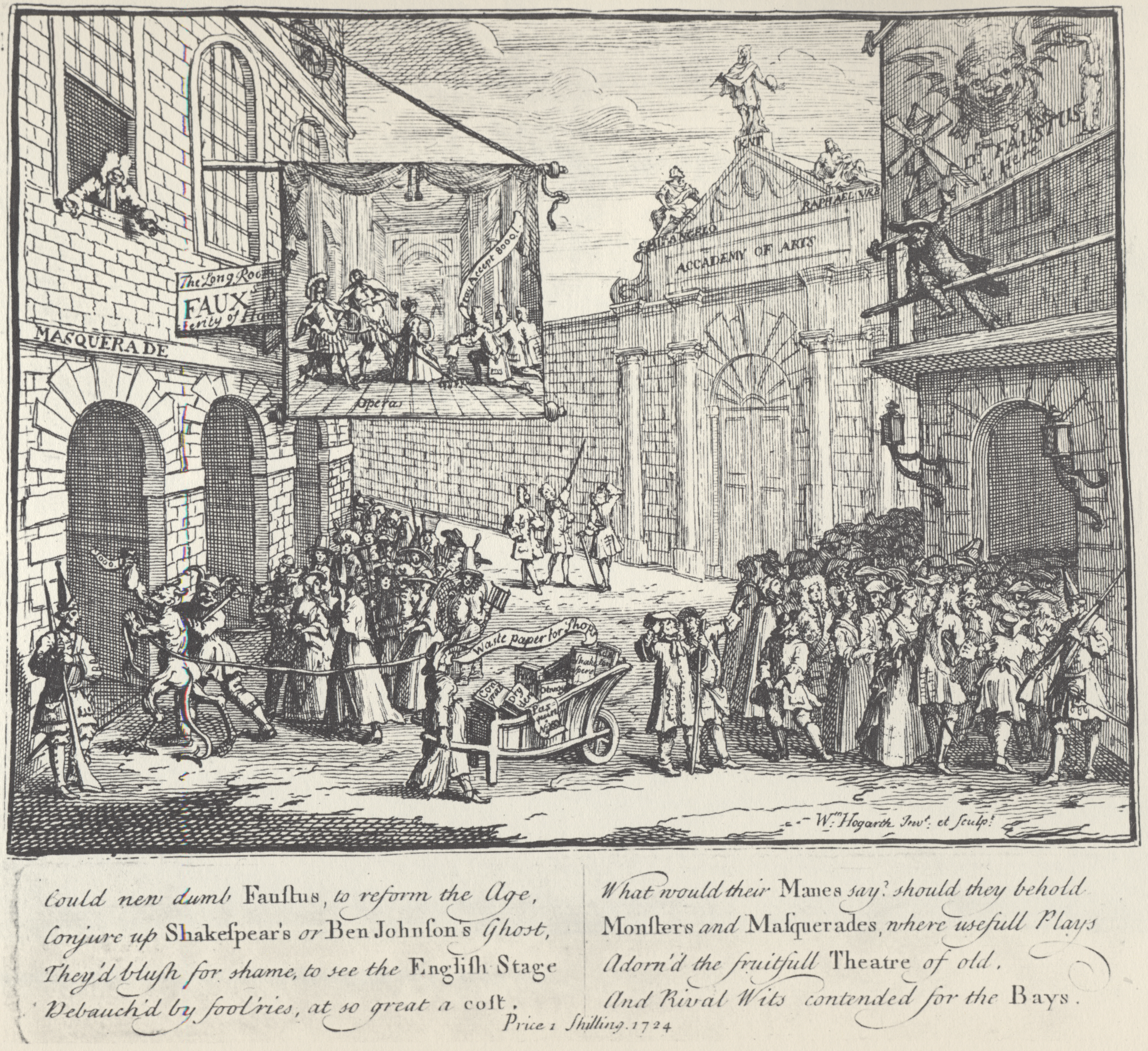
Masquerades and Operas (or the Bad Taste of the Town). Hogarth's 1723 satirical print shows that Fawkes (Faux) is established in the Long Room at the Haymarket alongside Heidegger and Rich. Fawkes does not appear in the picture himself (the man seen in the upper window is supposed to be Heidegger).

William Hogarth regarded the trend away from high art in favour of low theatrical entertainments such as those of Fawkes and Heidegger with disdain. Allusions to Fawkes' show feature prominently in his first issued print Masquerades and Operas (or the Bad Taste of the Town) of 1723 in which he mocks the public for their taste for an "English Stage, Debauch'd by fool'ries". Hogarth regarded Fawkes' popularity as indicative of the mentality of the public; as part of his act Fawkes produced money from thin air by an act of sleight-of-hand, which Hogarth may have seen as analogous to the exceptions of the investors in the South Sea Bubble (whom Hogarth had mocked earlier in his Emblematical Print on the South Sea Scheme). Fawkes' show appears again in Hogarth's Southwark Fair a print of which was issued together with A Rake's Progress in 1735. Fawkes himself was dead by this time, and though it is generally considered that Hogarth used a little artistic license in depicting Fawkes' booth as it had appeared in earlier times, it is impossible to say whether it is Fawkes or his son that appears in the scene, though Hogarth scholar Ronald Paulson thinks it more likely to be the father. (Note: Fawkes' daughter-in-law, Belle Fawkes, who briefly flourished as an actress in the early 1740s has been suggested as a possible model for the girl with the drum in the centre of this scene.)

Hogarth's satire seems to have had little effect on Fawkes' trade. By the time it appeared he had made enough money to no longer need to rely on the income from performing and in February 1724 had announced in the London Evening Post that he would retire at the end of that year's fair season. This proposed retirement may have been to connected to a problem he was suffering with one of his legs. Nothing further came of his threat to quit the business and in July he was proposing visiting Bristol with his show.

== Expanding his show ==
One of Fawkes' advertisements described his routine in some detail:

He takes an empty bag, lays it on the Table and turns it several times inside out, then commands 100 Eggs out of it and several showers of real Gold and silver, then the Bag beginning to swell several sorts of wild fowl run out of it upon the Table. He throws up a Pack of Cards, and causes them to be living birds flying about the room. He causes living Beasts, Birds, and other Creatures to appear upon the Table. He blows the spots of the Cards off and on, and changes them to any pictures.

He established himself at the Old Tennis Court playhouse in James Street between Haymarket and Whitcomb Street for several years, long enough for it to become known popularly as "Fawkes' Theatre", and announcements for his show while there showed that he was expanding its scope. He was always willing to give private shows and to take on pupils, but he was not complacent in his position at the forefront of London's popular entertainments. One of his pupils, William Phillips, was considered a better magician, and Fawkes sought to expand his repertoire beyond sleight-of-hand and contortionism. He formed a close professional partnership with the Fleet Street clock and automata maker, Christopher Pinchbeck. Pinchbeck was responsible for much of the apparatus that Fawkes employed from the late 1720s onwards. The earliest record of Pinchbeck's work appearing in Fawkes show is from a 1727 advertisement for the "Temple of Arts":

... with two moving pictures, the first being a Consort of Musick performed by several figures playing on various instruments with the greatest Harmoney and truth of time, the other giving a curious prospect of the City and Bay of Gibraltor, with ships of war and transports in their proper motions, as tho' in real action; likewise the Spanish troops marching thro' Old Gibraltor. Also the playing of a Duck in the river and the Dog diving after it, as natural as tho' alive. In this curious piece there are about 100 figures, all of which show the motions they represent as perfect as the life; the like of it was never seen in the world.

Fawkes' famous trick of producing an apple tree from seed which "bore ripe apples in less than a Minute's Time" relied on Pinchbeck's work and Fawkes slowly began to introduce demonstrations of some Pinchbeck's automata into his show alongside his sleight-of-hand conjuring and his son's contortionist display. Among Pinchbeck's works were the "Venetian Machine" or "Venetian Lady's Machine" which appears to have been a forerunner of the scrolling dioramas that would become popular in London in the 19th century. Pinchbeck usually received little or no billing in Fawkes' act and if he attended any of the performances or shows he did not do so on a regular basis, but the relationship between the two men seems to have been close as Fawkes slowly shifted the focus of his show towards demonstrations of Pinchbeck's designs. He continued to appear at the London fairs and continued to perform his conjuring act, but rather than stressing his feats of dexterity he concentrated on tricks based around Pinchbeck's designs and on displays of Pinchbeck's automata and clocks in shows with various flowery titles such as the "Grand Theatre of the Muses" or "Multum in Parvo".

Then Ralph upon Dobbin and Joan upon Ball,
Jog away to the Fair both the Great and the Small;
But be sure don't forget this strange Man to behold,
Who turns Cards into Mice, and from nothing makes Gold.

— St James's Evening Post, 21 July 1726

Fawkes adoption of Pinchbeck's creations as part of the show allowed him to further distance himself from black magic and witchcraft. In the public's eye he was more closely aligned to the travelling natural philosophers – early scientists who often demonstrated recent discoveries in the sciences in touring shows that were part education and part entertainment. Fawkes would still invoke spirits for promotional effect though; a 1726 advertisement for an appearance at Bristol Fair jokingly referred to his "whole Equipage" which included "auxiliary Spirits and Demons, shut up in a Bottle for Conveniency of Carriage".

His relation with Pinchbeck did not stop him exploiting opportunities in the market when he got the chance; Mist's Weekly Journal reported on 1 June 1728 that:

Some considerable Persons, who are reputed Artists in Legerdemain, are preparing to go into the Country for the Vacation; on the contrary Mr Fawkes is just arrived in Town to play his juggling Tricks in their Absence, expecting to have all the Practice to himself.

Fawkes also added an occasional Punch and Judy show (which at the time was billed as "Punch and his wife Joan") to his act and in this he worked with the son of the famous puppeteer Martin Powell, though he and Powell were also sometime rivals for the audiences at the fairs.

By 1726 Fawkes' show included his Posture Master, the automata of Pinchbeck, Powell's puppet show, and giant waxwork figures:

first his surprising Dexterity of Hand, in which he far exceeds all that ever pretended to the same Art, with his Cards, Eggs, Mice, Money, and several curious Birds from divers Parts of the World that never were seen here before. 2d. His Famous Posture Master, who is allowed to be the best in Europe of that kind. 3d. His Musical Clock that plays Variety of Tunes of Tunes on the Organ, Flute and Flagelet, with Birds whistling and singing as natural as Life. 4th. His Puppet Show, with the Comical Humours of Punch and his wife Joan: Like-wise a Court of the richest and largest Figures ever shown in England, being as big as Men and Women.

He also added a "Horned Woman", Elizabeth French:

Mr Fawks, the famous Hocus Pocus, shews at present in Pall-Mall, a wonderful Woman, having a beautiful Rams-Horn growing out of her Head, and divers strange Nodes which 'tis thought may produce Horns.

French, who had a 10-inch (25 cm) horn-like growth on the back of her head, remained in Fawkes' employ for several years, but she eventually knocked the growth from her head when she fell down some stairs; the horn was sold to Sir Hans Sloane.

Fawkes' success continued; in 1730 he performed for "Indian Princes", and in 1731 he gave a show to the visiting Algerian ambassador and his party along with "a great many person of Quality and Distinction" at which he showed the apple tree illusion and a "prospect of Algiers" in the Venetian Machine. He so amazed the visiting party that (according to The Craftsman) after tasting the apples produced from the quick-growing tree, they refused to touch anything else that belonged to him.

== Death and legacy ==
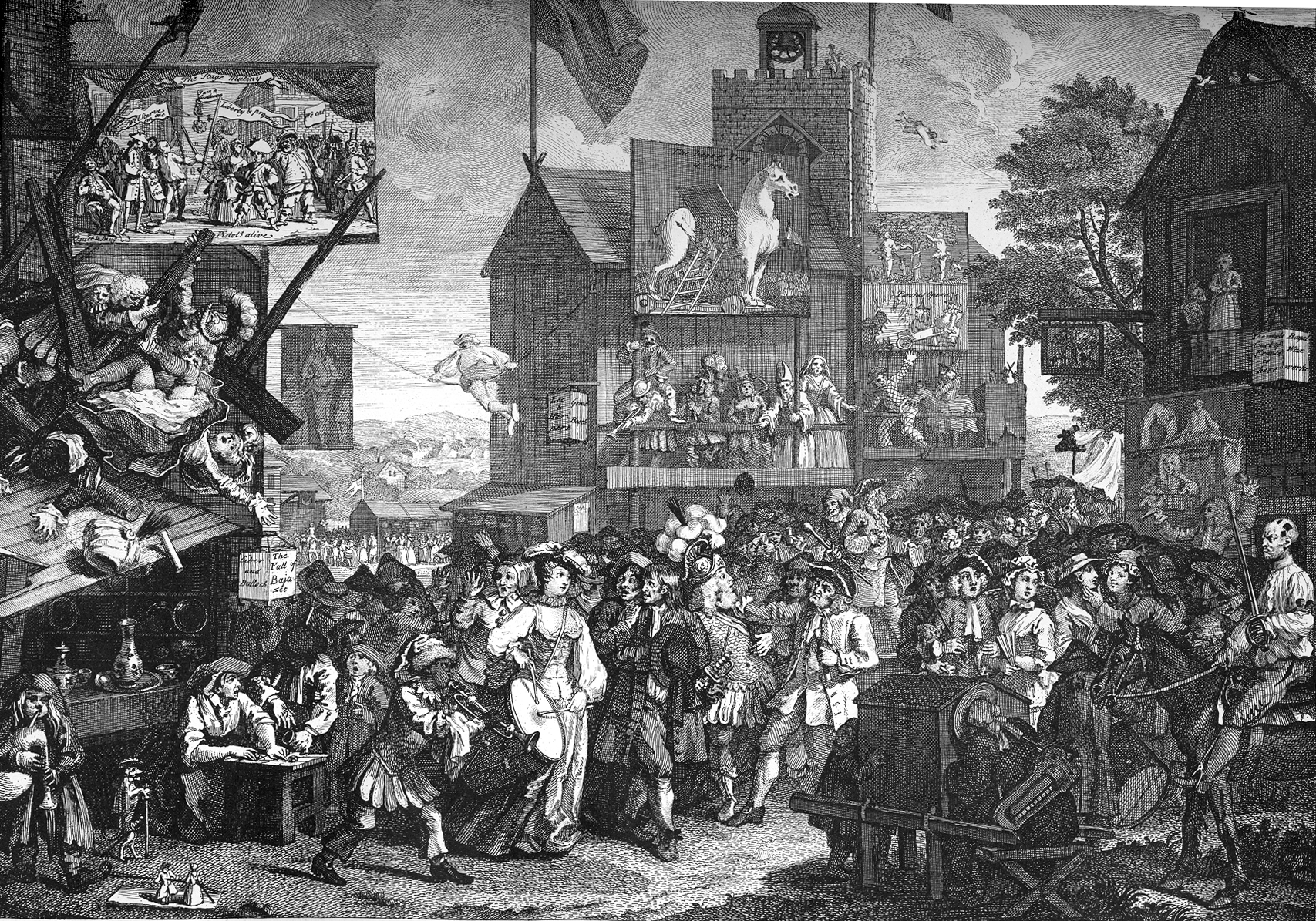
Southwark Fair by William Hogarth 1733. Fawkes' booth can be seen in the centre on the extreme right. The conjurer performing in front of the booth may be Fawkes though in reality he was dead by this time.

While Fawkes was performing at one of the fairs early in 1732 a fire broke out in a neighbouring booth and frightened his wife, Alice, so severely that she had to go into an "early confinement". Whether this fire was connected to Fawkes' death later that year is not known. Fawkes died on 25 May 1732 and was buried at St Martin-in-the-Fields, Westminster three days later. He had amassed a considerable fortune to leave to Alice; reports at the time suggested he "had honestly acquired a fortune of above ten thousand pounds, being no more than he really deserved for his great ingenuity, by which he surpassed all that ever pretended to be art."

Pinchbeck's younger son, Edward, took over the business alongside Fawkes' son. On 17 November, Edward married Fawkes' widow, Alice, at most a few days before his father died (reports vary between 18 and 22 November). Fawkes' show appears to have initially continued to flourish under the management of his son and Pinchbeck – in 1733 they exhibited clocks and automata again as the "Grand Theatre of the Muses" at Bartholomew Fair – but they slowly moved towards producing shows of puppetry and working as puppeteers and, although they were still advertising their booth at Southwark Fair in 1741, they seem to have ceased performing after 1746.

Aside from his possible appearance in Southwark Fair there are few images of Fawkes; there is a broadsheet by Sutton Nichols which includes a panel featuring Fawkes and this basic line sketch is used again in one of his extant advertisements, but the best-known portrait is a detail from a Bartholomew Fair souvenir fan – possibly painted by Thomas Loggon in around 1740 – which features an image of Fawkes on the promotional show-cloth of his stand.
