= The Bad Taste of the Town =

Artistic print by William Hogarth

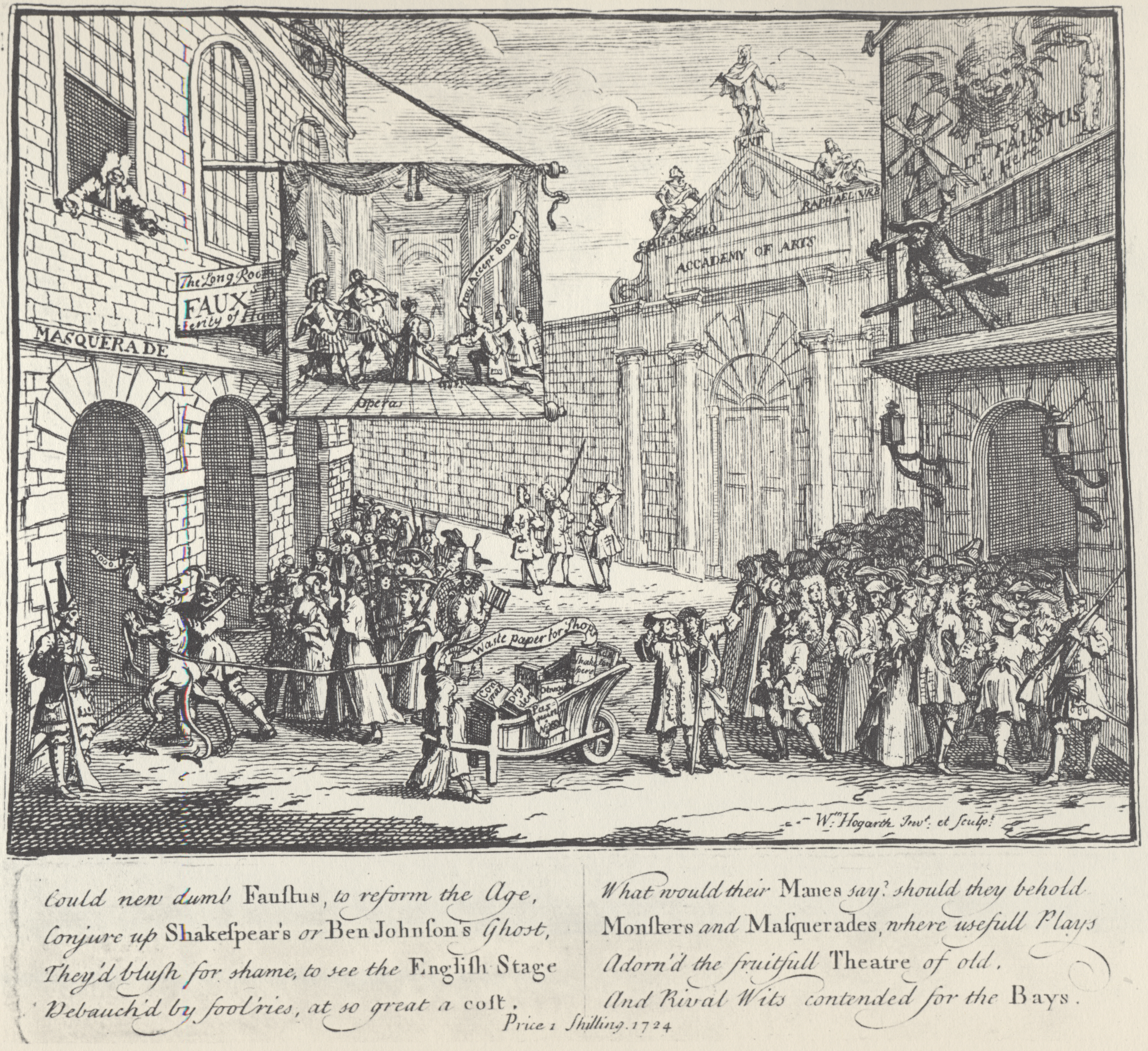
First state of print (see reference to "Pasquin" in the wheelbarrow)

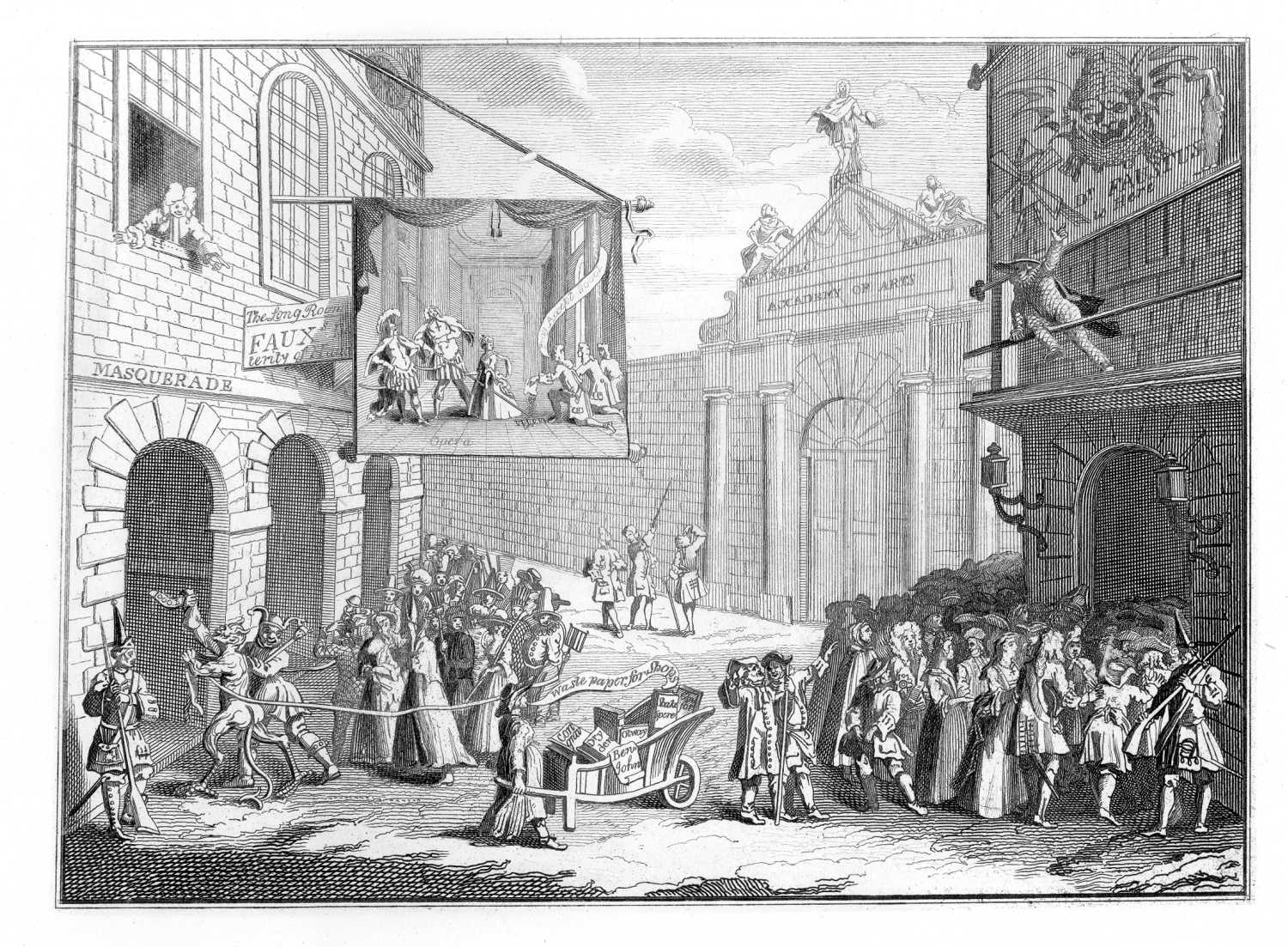
Later state of the print ("Pasquin" replaced by "Ben Johnson").

The Bad Taste of the Town (also known as Masquerades and Operas) is an early print by the British artist William Hogarth, first published in February 1723. The small print – 5 by 6 inches (13 by 15 cm) – mocks the contemporary fashion for foreign culture, including Palladian architecture, pantomimes based on the Italian commedia dell'arte, masquerades (masked balls), and Italian opera. The work combines two printmaking techniques – etching and engraving – with etched lines made in the plate using acid and engraved lines marked using a burin.

== Description ==
Outside the building to the left – probably King's Theatre, Haymarket – a queue of masked people is being led to a masquerade ball by a devil or satyr bearing aloft a bag containing £1,000 accompanied by a figure wearing a jester's cap and bells with a garter round his right leg (possibly intended to be the Prince of Wales, later George II, who was said to enjoy masquerades).

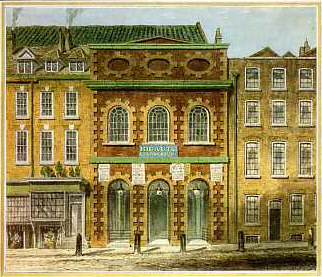
King's Theatre, Haymarket before a fire in 1789

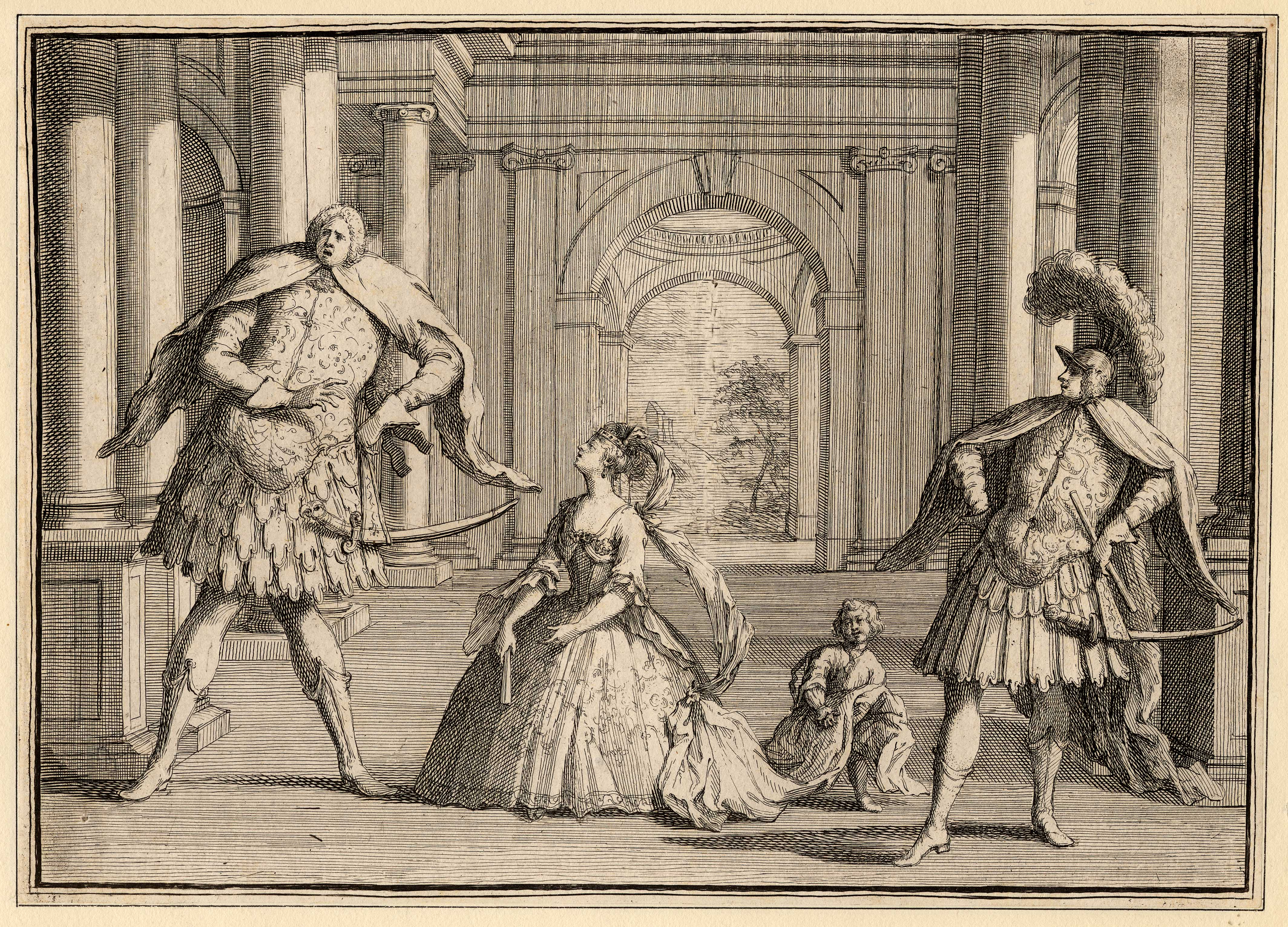
Caricature of Cuzzoni, Berenstadt and Senesino.

A banner hanging above the entrance shows Charles Mordaunt, 3rd Earl of Peterborough and two other noblemen kneeling before the Italian soprano opera singer Francesca Cuzzoni, asking her "pray accept £8,000" to perform in London. The Earl is pouring money on the floor, and she draws it towards her with a rake, while two male singers stand behind. The banner is based on a 1723 caricature by another engraver of a performance of Handel's opera Flavio which featured Cuzzoni as Emilia, with Berenstadt as Flavio, and Senesino as Guido.

Another sign advertises the conjuring act of Isaac Fawkes in the building's "Long room". John James Heidegger, Swiss impresario, manager of the King's Theatre, Haymarket, and introducer of the masquerades to London, leans out of a window, identifiable by the letter "H" on the window ledge under him.

To the right, another crowd waits outside Lincoln's Inn Fields Theatre to see John Rich's commedia dell'arte pantomime Harlequin Doctor Faustus. The mitred soldiers guarding the buildings also hint at the patronage of George I, a monarch born in Germany who did not speak English. A countryman with his staff looks on incredulously, as one of the city dwellers tries to interest him in the play.

In the background, Hogarth depicts the gate to Burlington House – the London house of Richard Boyle, 3rd Earl of Burlington in Piccadilly – labelled "Accademy [sic] of Art", topped by a sculpture of Burlington's favoured architect William Kent (KNT), lifted above Michelangelo and Raphael. Hogarth preferred the old English Baroque style over the new Palladian style preferred by Burlington and Kent, as exemplified by Burlington's residence at Chiswick House. In the street outside, a trio of connoisseurs admire the prospect – one may be intended to be Burlington.

Hogarth contrasts the fashion for foreign entertainments with the neglect of their British equivalents. A woman in the centre foreground is pushing a wheelbarrow filled with the works of great English dramatists – William Congreve, John Dryden, Thomas Otway, William Shakespeare, and Joseph Addison – being sold as "waste paper for shops". The first state of the print includes a reference to Anthony Pasquin, replaced in later versions by Ben Jonson.

A verse underneath the first version of the print comments:

Could new dumb Faustus, to reform the Age,
Conjure up Shakespear's, or Ben Johnson's Ghost,
They'd blush for shame, to see the English Stage
Debauch'd by fool'ries, at so great a cost.

What would their Manes say? should they behold
Monsters and Masquerades, where usefull [sic] Plays
Adorn'd the fruitfull [sic] Theatre of old,
And Rival Wits contended for the Bays.

== Reception ==
Hogarth attempted to publish the print himself, to avoid the monopoly of the Stationers' Company, and sold the print for cost one shilling. The print was popular, but not a commercial success for Hogarth as half-price unauthorized copies appeared soon after its publication. Hogarth's problems with copyright infringement of his prints made him an advocate for copyright reform, which ultimately led to the Engraving Copyright Act 1734.

Later in 1724, Hogarth published A Just View of the British Stage, in which Ben Jonson's ghost rises through a trapdoor and literally pisses on the idiocies of the theatre managers.

He followed up with his Emblematical Print on the South Sea Scheme – a similar composition with crowds between buildings to either side – and another 1724 engraving entitled The Lottery, sold through the printsellers Mrs Chilcott in Westminster Hall and R Caldwell in Newgate Street.

== See also ==
- List of works by William Hogarth
