= Les Grandes Misères de la guerre =

1633 series of etchings by Jacques Callot

The Great Miseries of War
- Les Grandes Misères de la guerre (French)
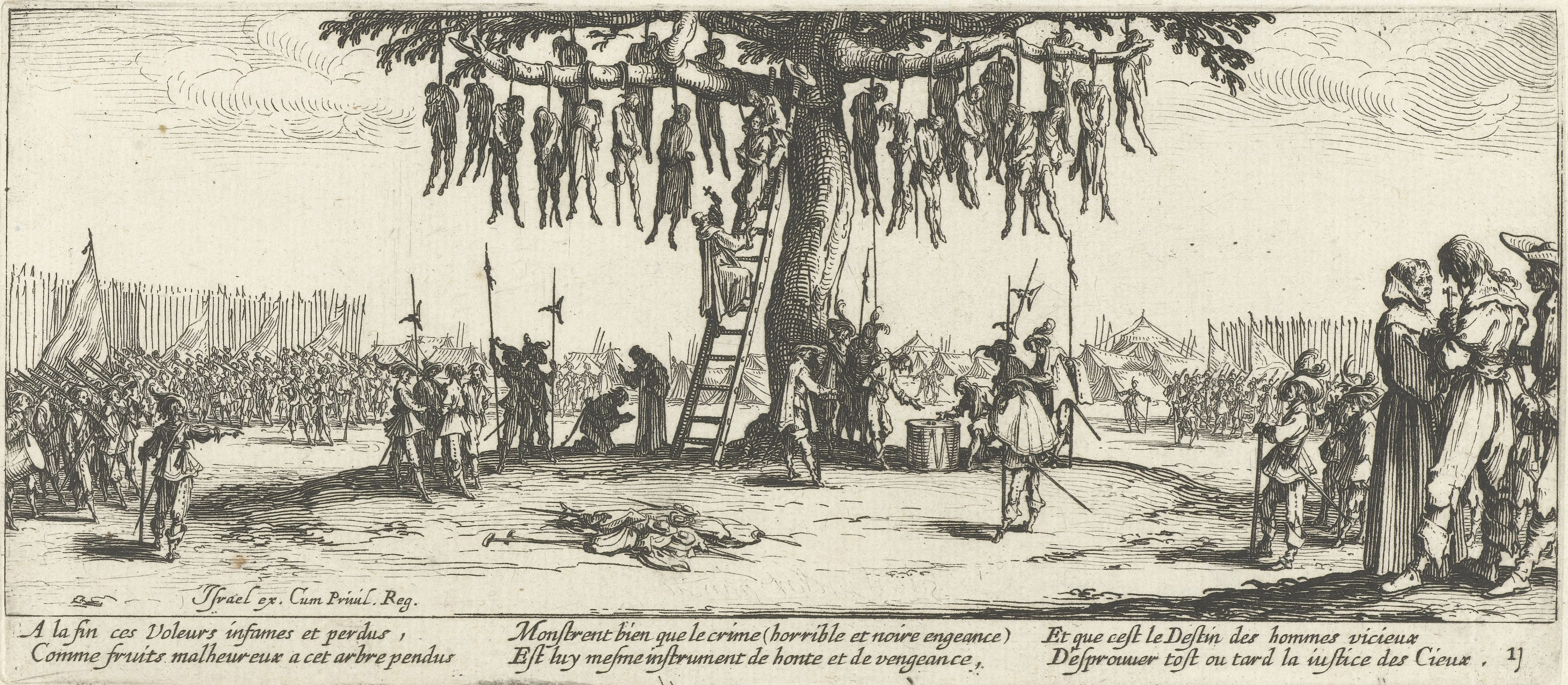
- La Pendaison (The Hanging), the 11th and most famous plate in the series
- Artist: Jacques Callot
- Year: 1633
- Medium: etching
- Dimensions: 8.3 cm × 18 cm (3.3 in × 7.1 in)

Les Grandes Misères de la guerre (French: [lɛ ɡʁɑ̃d mizɛʁ də la ɡɛʁ]; English: The Great Miseries of War or The Miseries and Misfortunes of War) are a series of 18 etchings by Lorrainian artist Jacques Callot (1592–1635), titled in full Les Misères et les Malheurs de la Guerre. Despite the grand theme of the series, the images are in fact only about 83 mm × 180 mm (3.25 x 7 inches) each, and are called the "large" Miseries to distinguish them from an even smaller earlier set on the same subject. Published in 1633, the series is Callot's best-known work and has been called the first "anti-war statement" in European art.

The images are panoramic views with many small figures, and they feature gradation from light to dark that was typical of Callot's etchings. In sequence, the images recount the story of soldiers as they enroll in an army, fight in a battle, and rampage through the civilian community, only to then be arrested and executed. The etchings can also be considered as an early prototypical French comic strip, within the text comics genre, since the illustrations are accompanied by a descriptive text beneath the images.

== Description ==
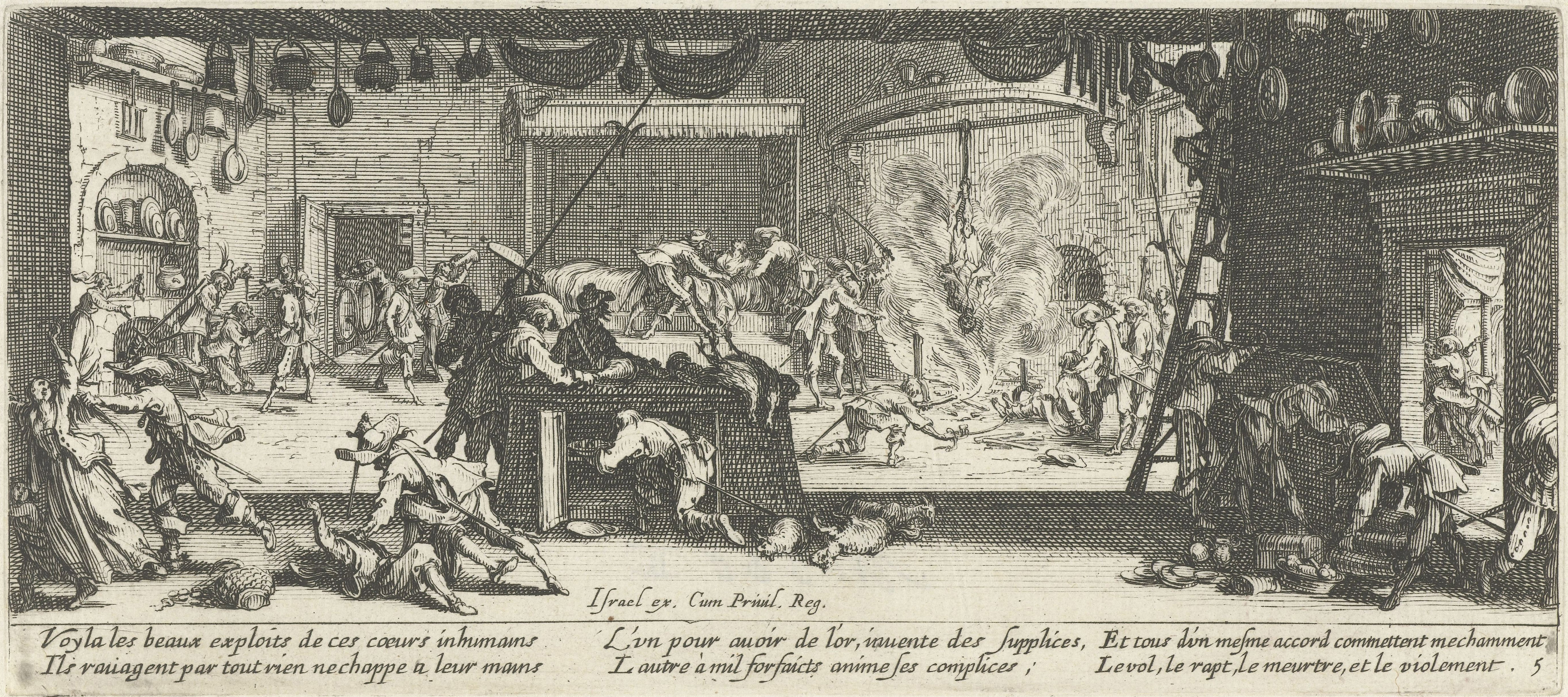
Plate 5, Le pillage, the soldiers pillage a house

Les Grandes Misères depict the destruction unleashed on civilians during the Thirty Years' War; no specific campaign is depicted, but the set inevitably recalls the actions of the army that Cardinal Richelieu sent in 1633 to occupy Callot's native Lorraine before annexing it to France. Callot was living in the capital, Nancy, at the time, though the prints were published, like most of his work, in Paris, with the necessary royal licence. The plates still exist, in a museum in Nancy, as do seven drawings of whole compositions, and many tiny studies for figures, with a large group in the Hermitage Museum.

The series begins with a florid title page, followed by an enrollment parade and a battle scene. Plates 4–8 show bands of the victorious soldiers successively attacking a farm, convent, and coach, and burning a village. In plates 9–14 they are rounded up and subjected to various methods of public torture and execution. Plate 15 shows crippled soldiers in a grand neo-classical hospital, Plate 16 unemployed soldiers dying in the street, and Plate 17 the peasants taking revenge on a group they have captured, killing them with flails. Plate 18 shows an enthroned king distributing rewards to the victorious generals.

Each print has a six-line verse caption below the image, written by the famous print-collector Michel de Marolles. All show wide panoramic views, with many tiny figures, as is typical of Callot's work. The technique of using multiple bitings of acid on the plate, with different areas "stopped-out", was perfected by Callot. This method allows gradations in the strength of the line, with distant parts of the scene usually lighter.

The general structure of the work and the details of the individual images can be interpreted as propagating the just, law-enforcing and crime-fighting regime of the Catholic French monarchy.

== Legacy ==
The central image in what might be the first editorial cartoon is a parody of La Pendaison. In William Hogarth's early engraving Emblematical Print on the South Sea Scheme, the hanging tree is replaced by a wheel of fortune. Francisco Goya probably owned a set of Callot's etchings, and they are believed to have influenced his similar series, Los Desastres de la guerra (The Disasters of War), almost two centuries later.

== Gallery ==
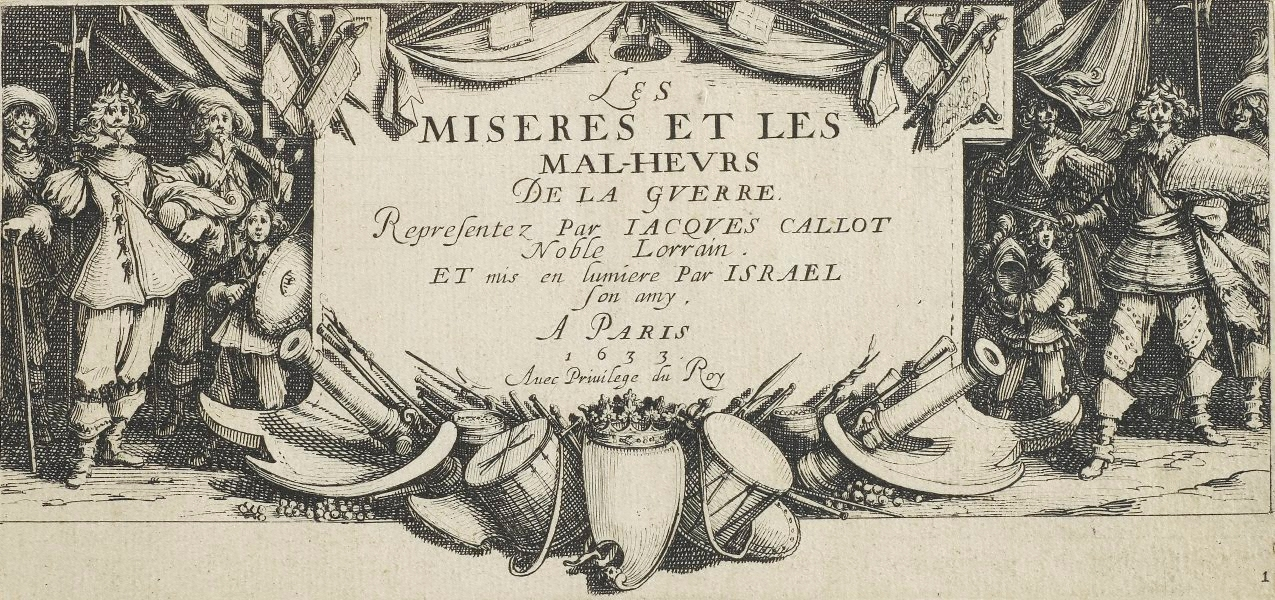
Plate 1: Frontispiece

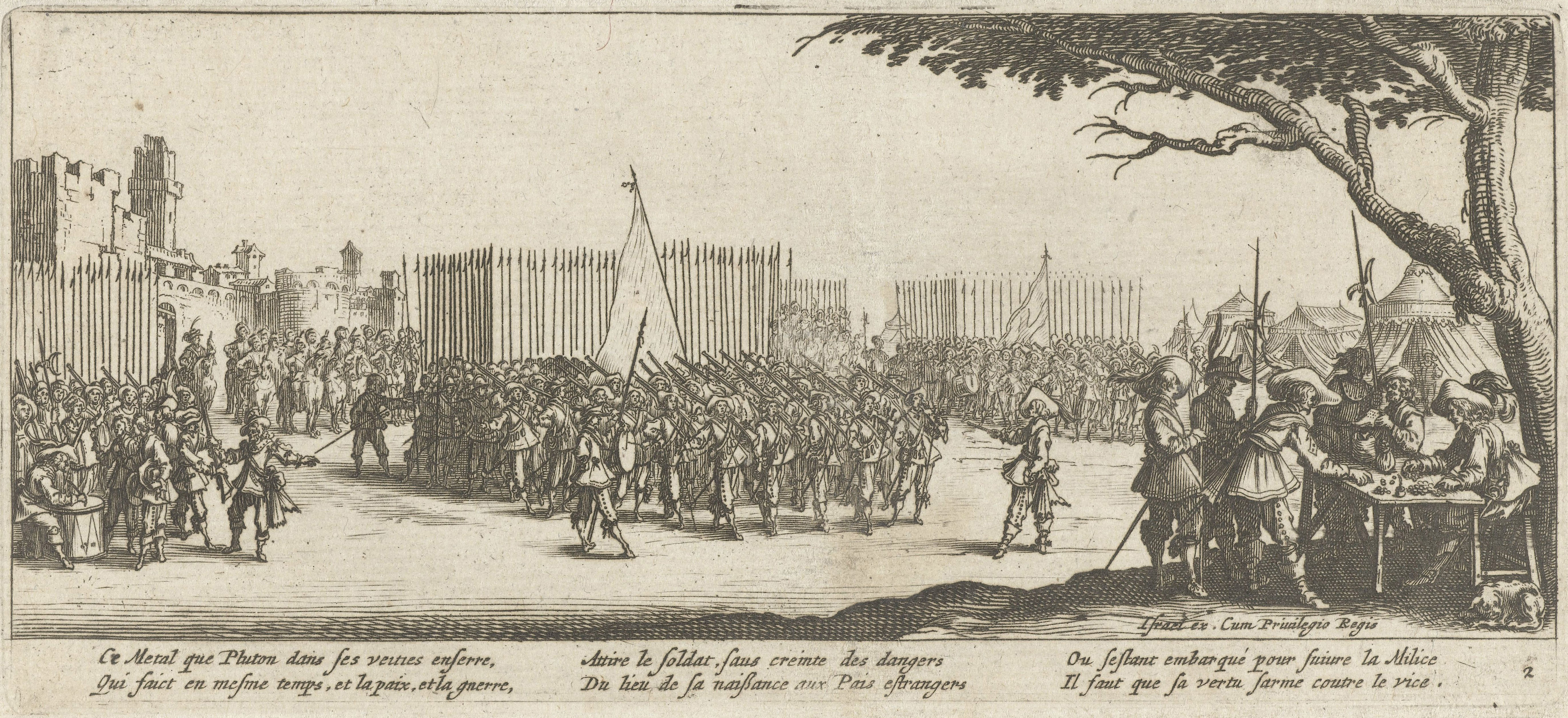
Plate 2: L'enrôlement des troupes (Enrolling the troops)

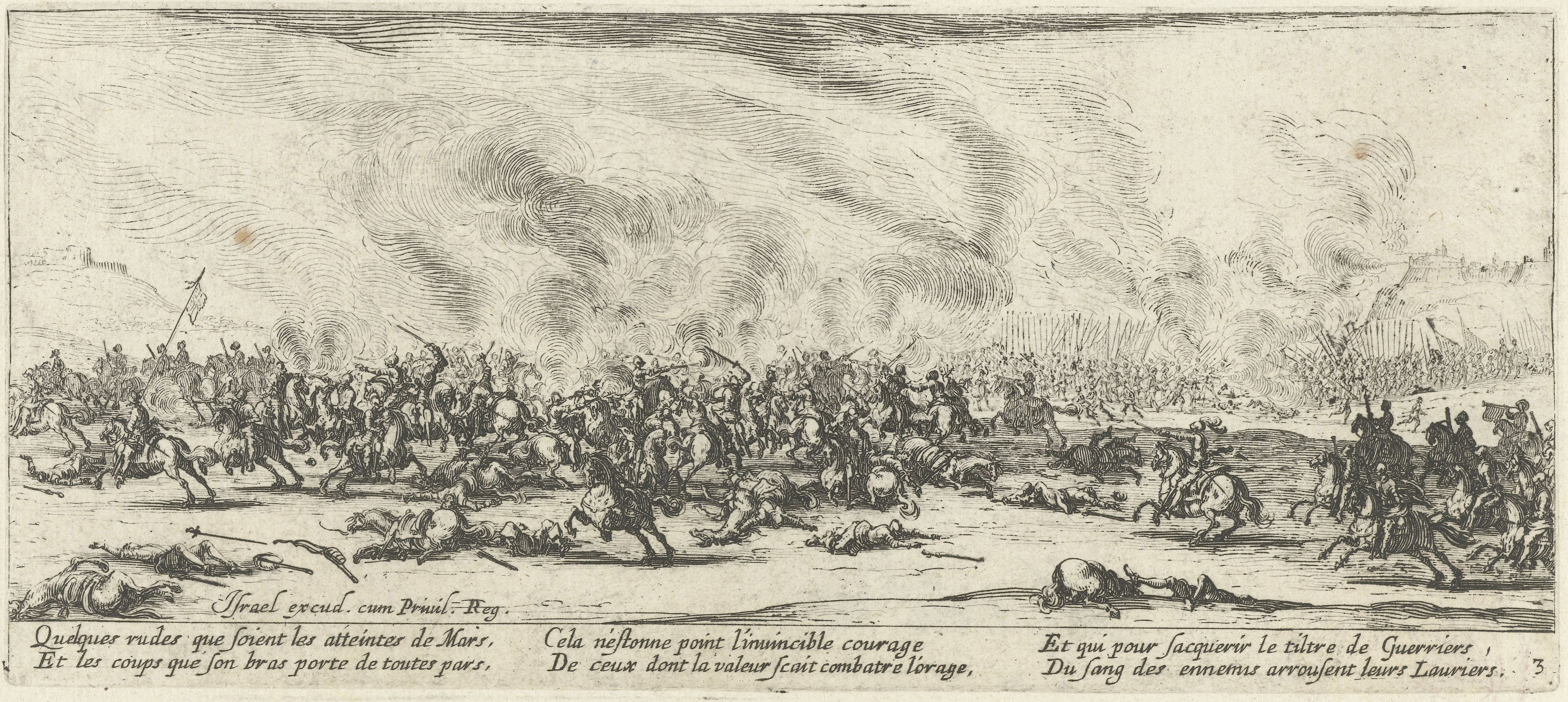
Plate 3: La bataille (The battle)

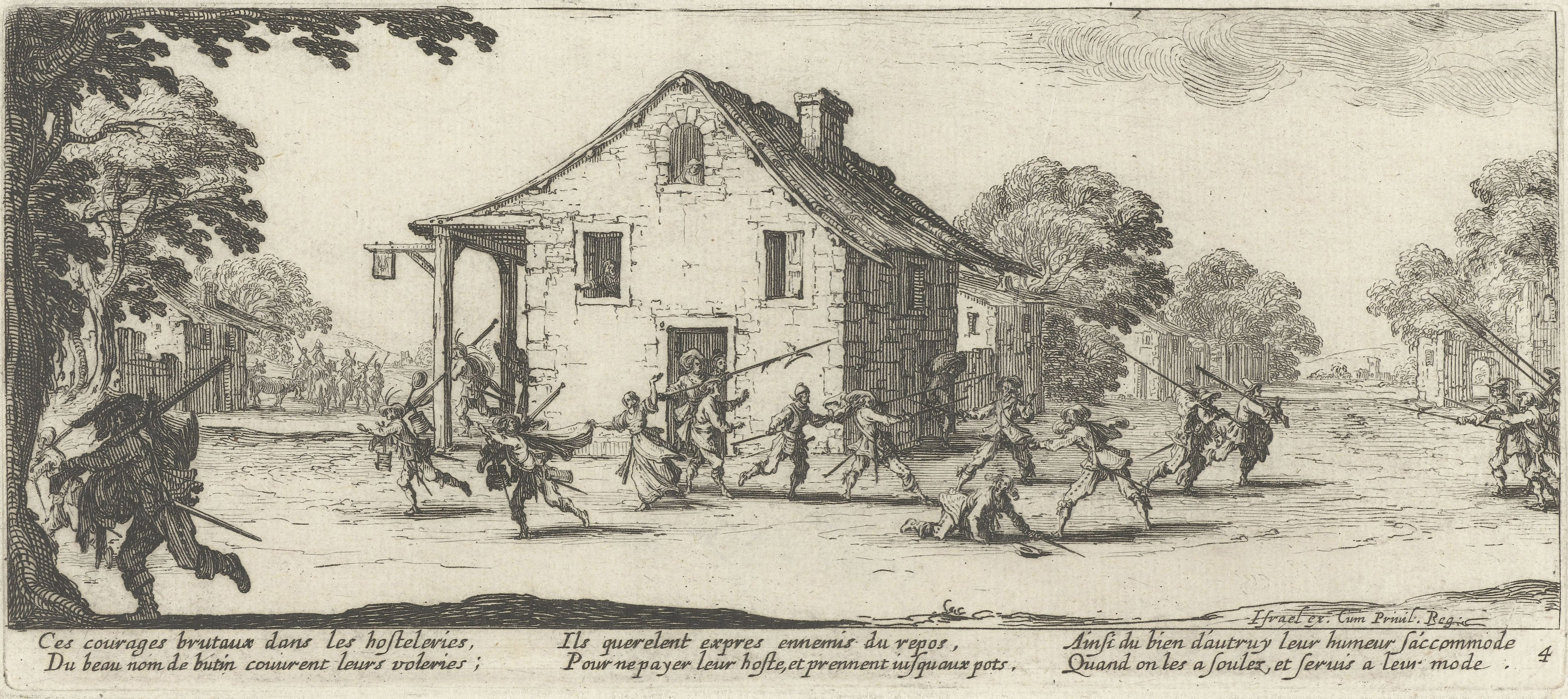
Plate 4: La maraude (The raid)

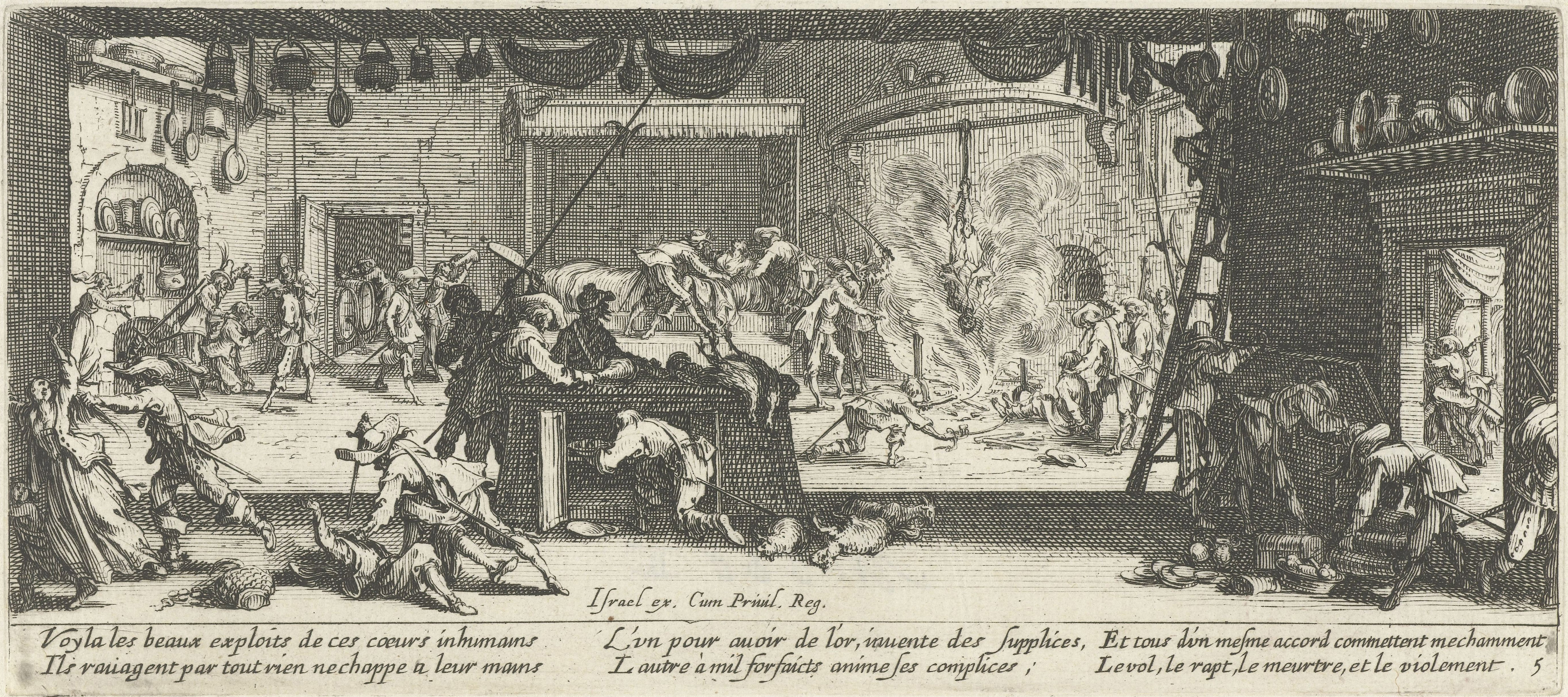
Plate 5: Le pillage (Pillaging a house)

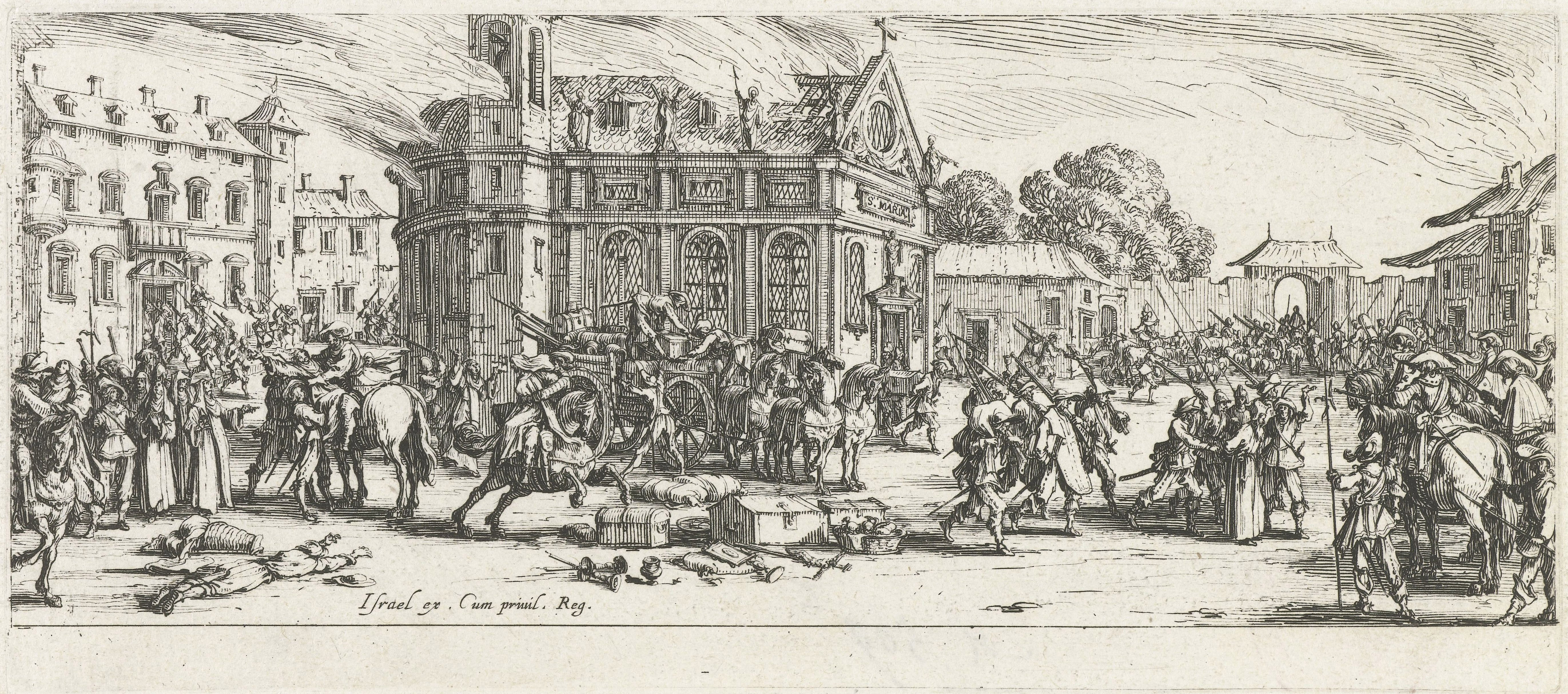
Plate 6: Dévastation d'un monastère (Looting a monastery)

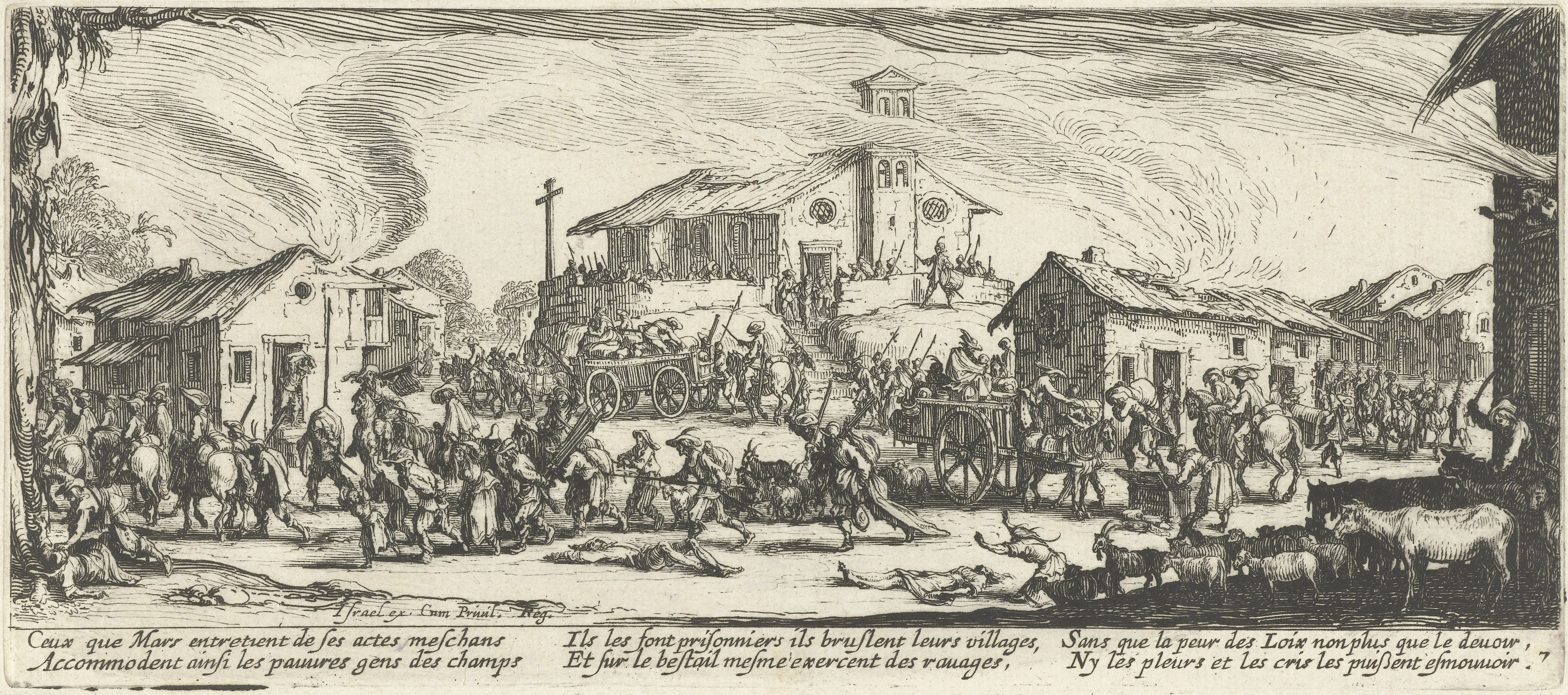
Plate 7: Pillage et incendie d'un village (Looting and burning a village)

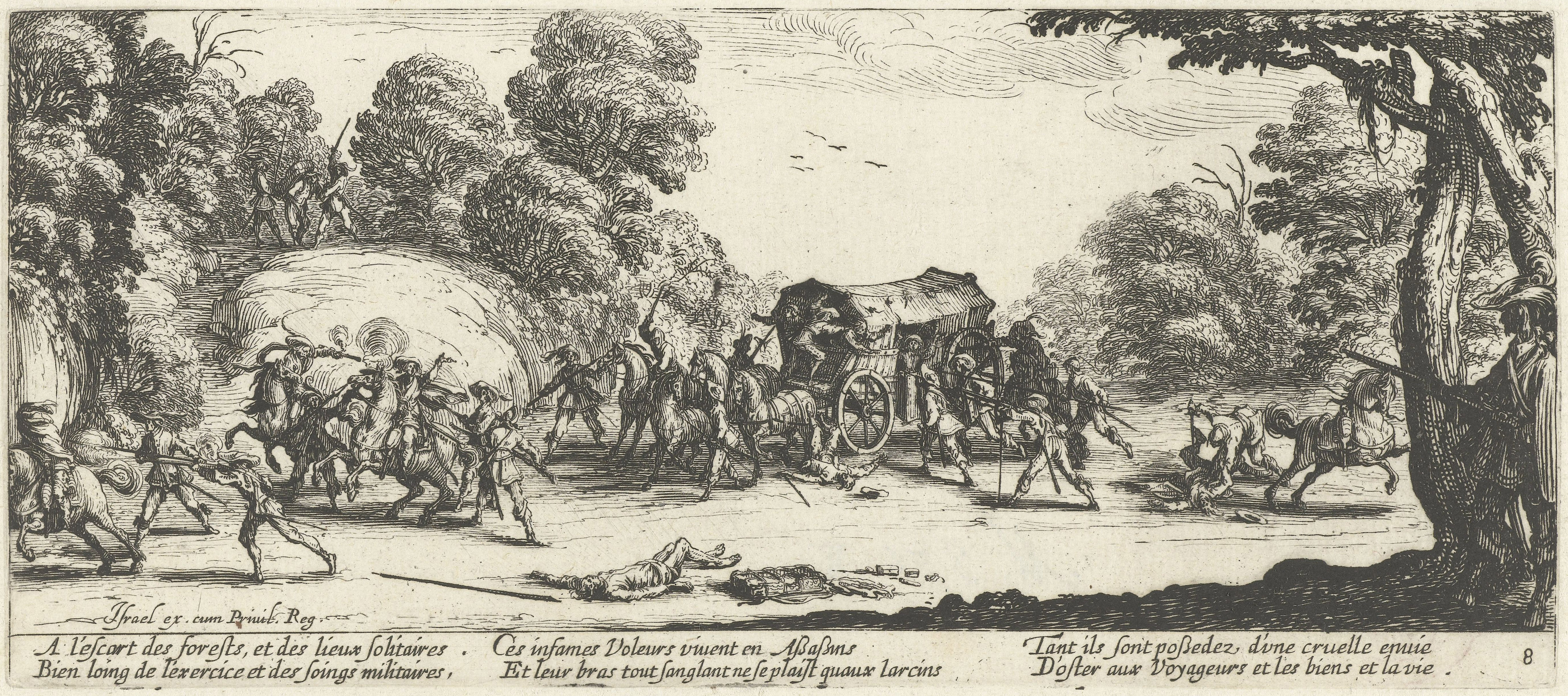
Plate 8: Vol sur les grandes routes (Highway robbery)

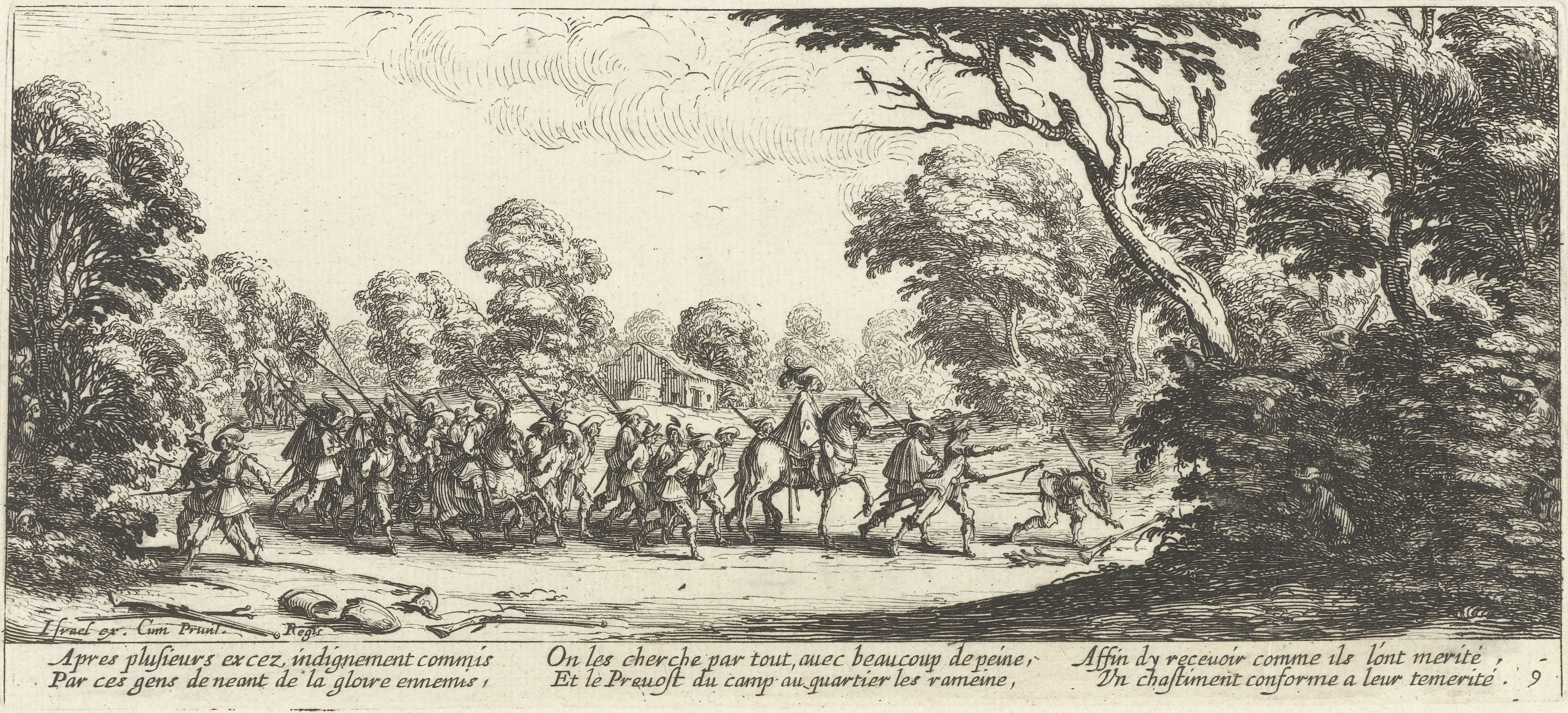
Plate 9: Découverte des malfaiteurs (Arrest of the offenders)

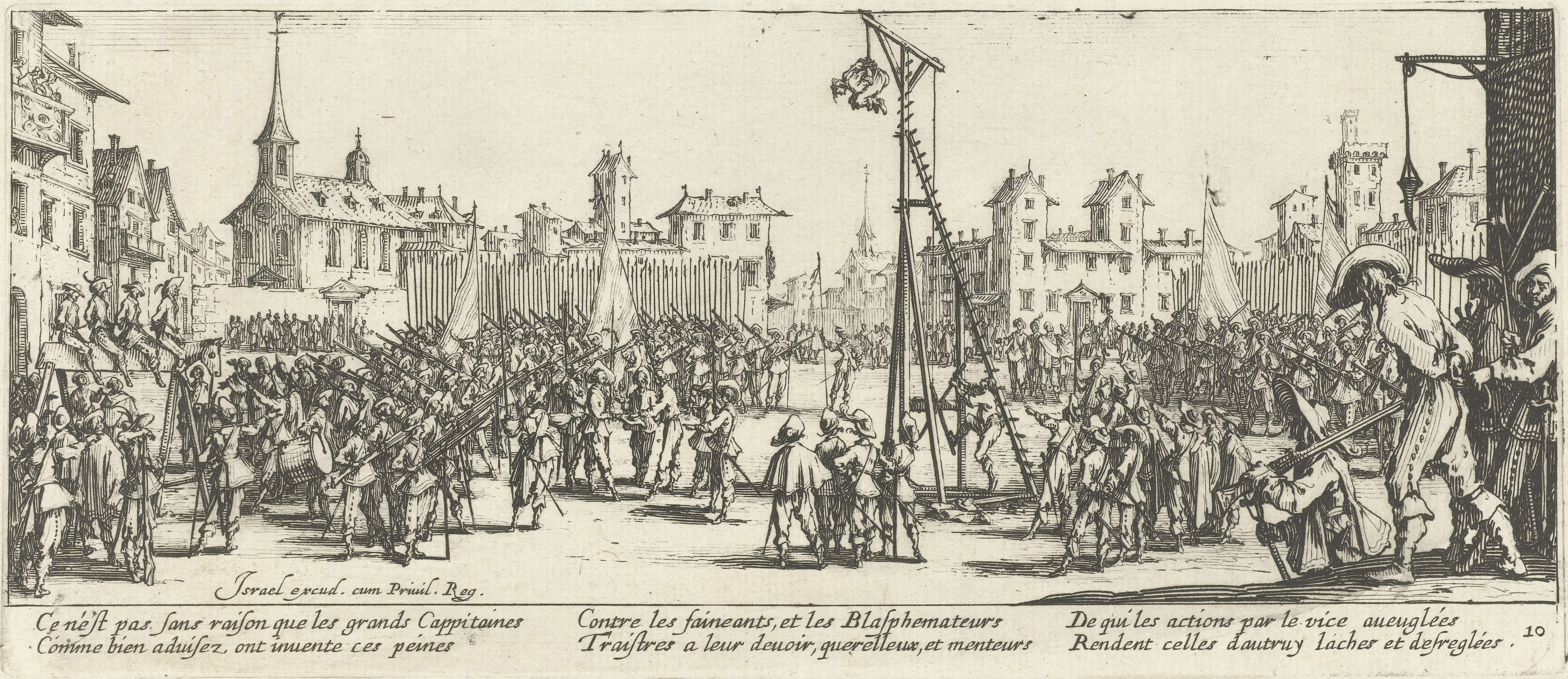
Plate 10: L'estrapade, or Strappado

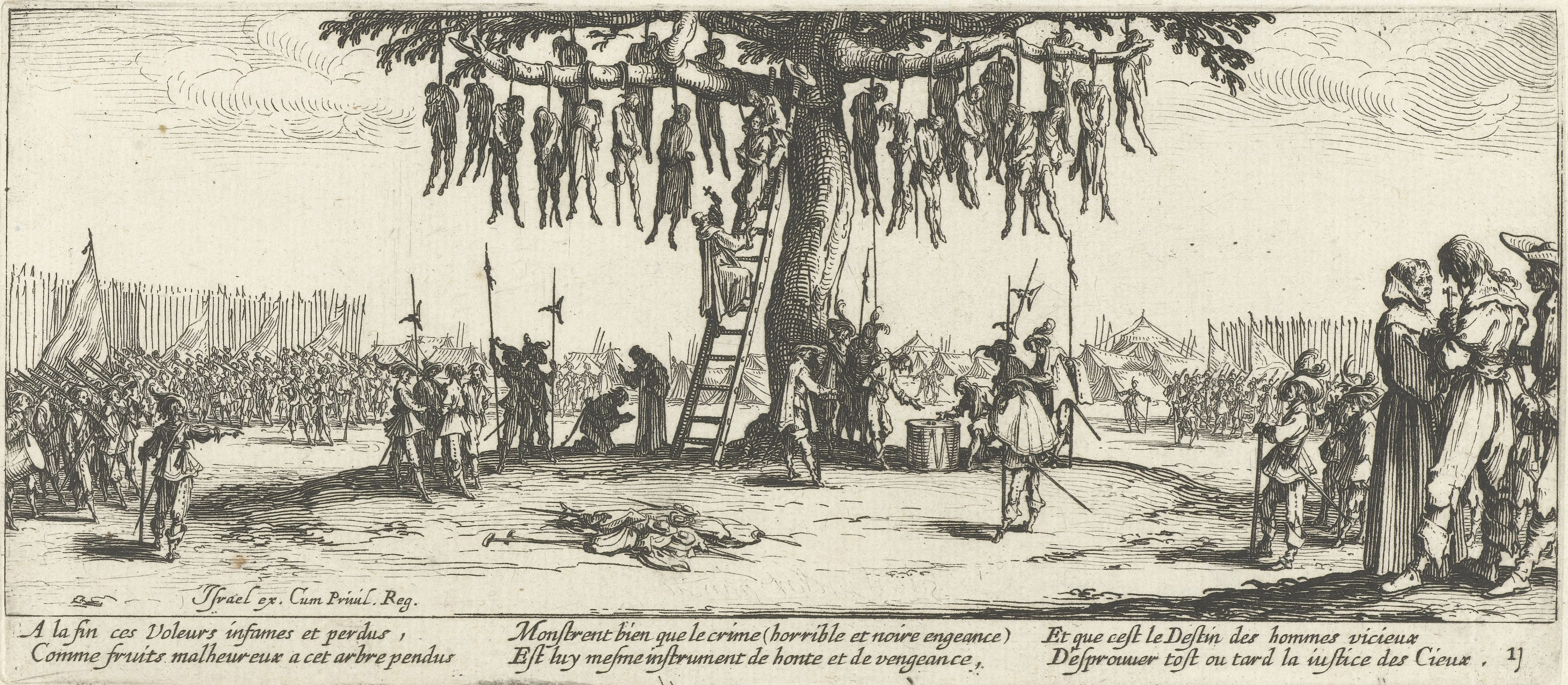
Plate 11: La pendaison (The Hanging)

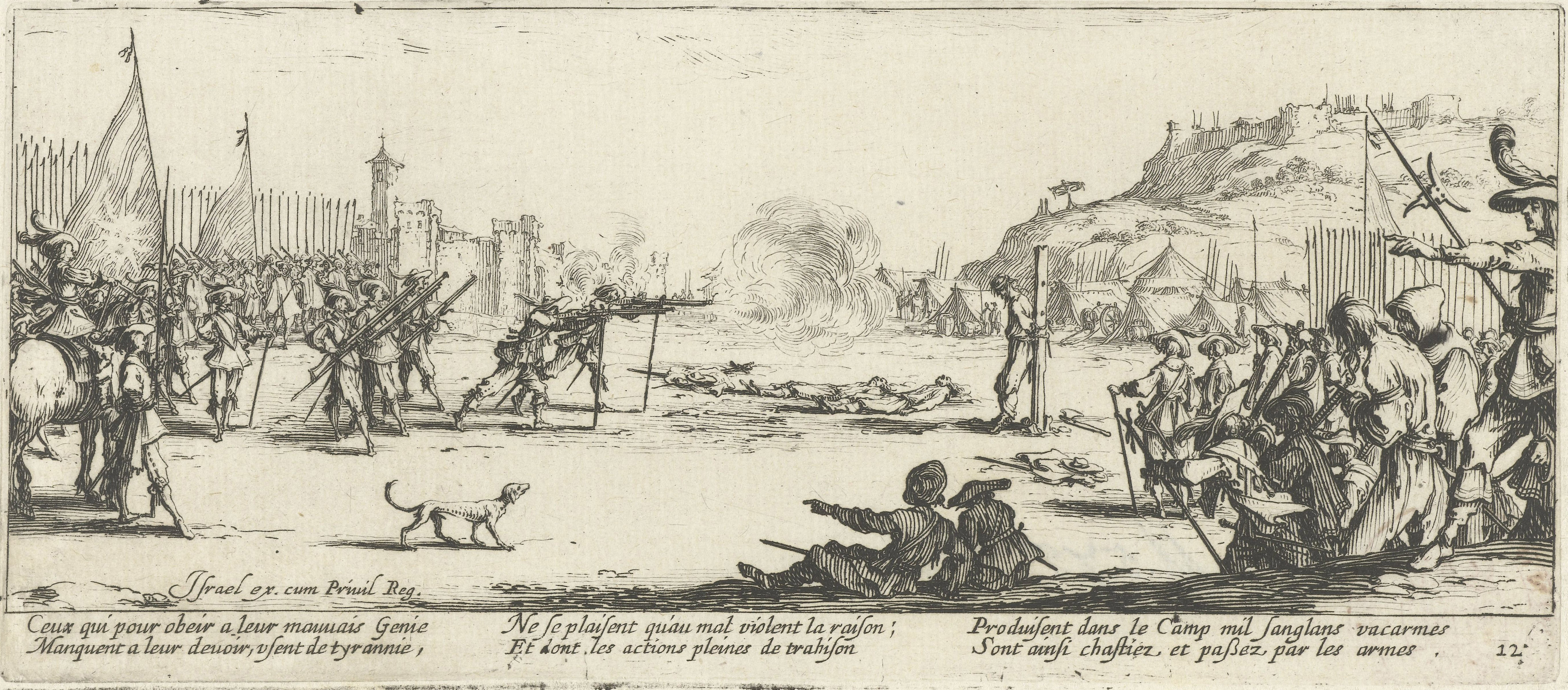
Plate 12: L'arquebusade, or Firing squad

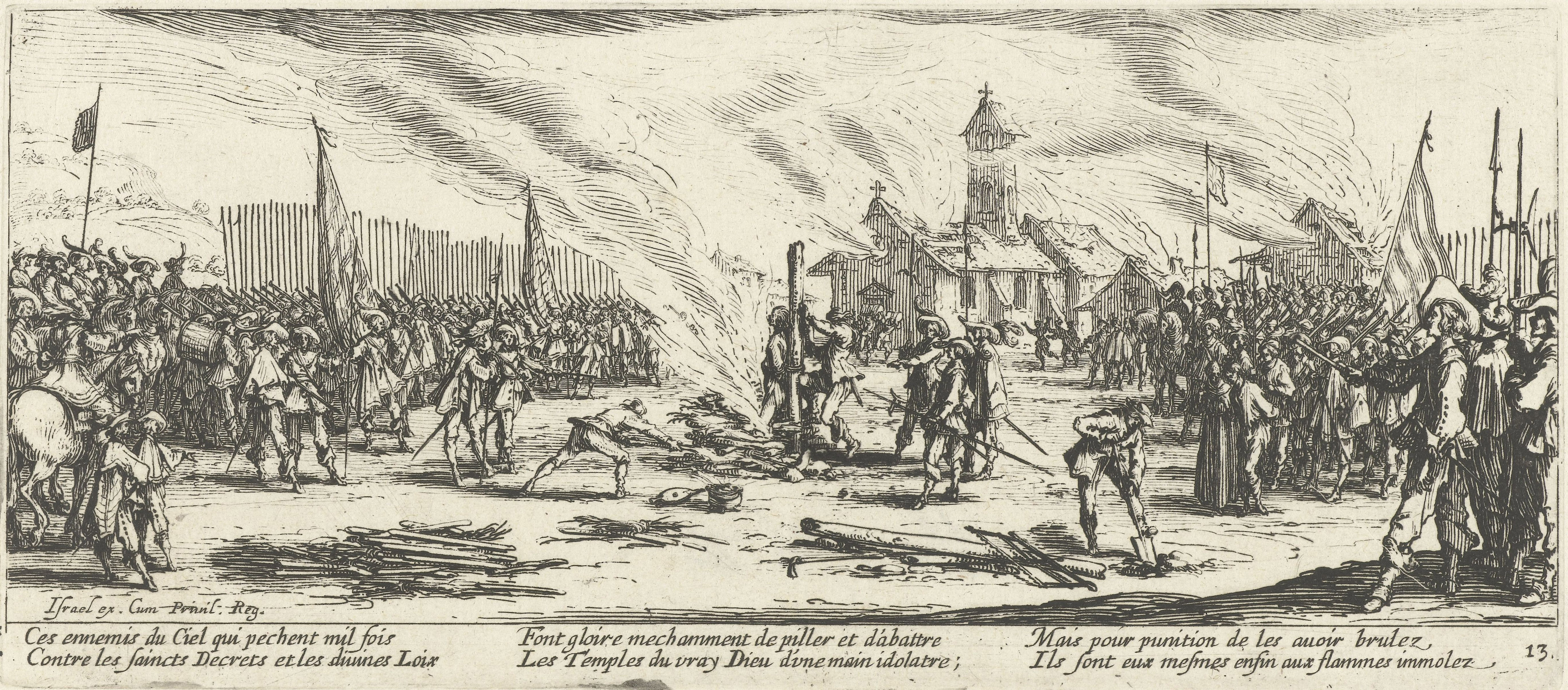
Plate 13: Le bûcher, or Burning at the stake

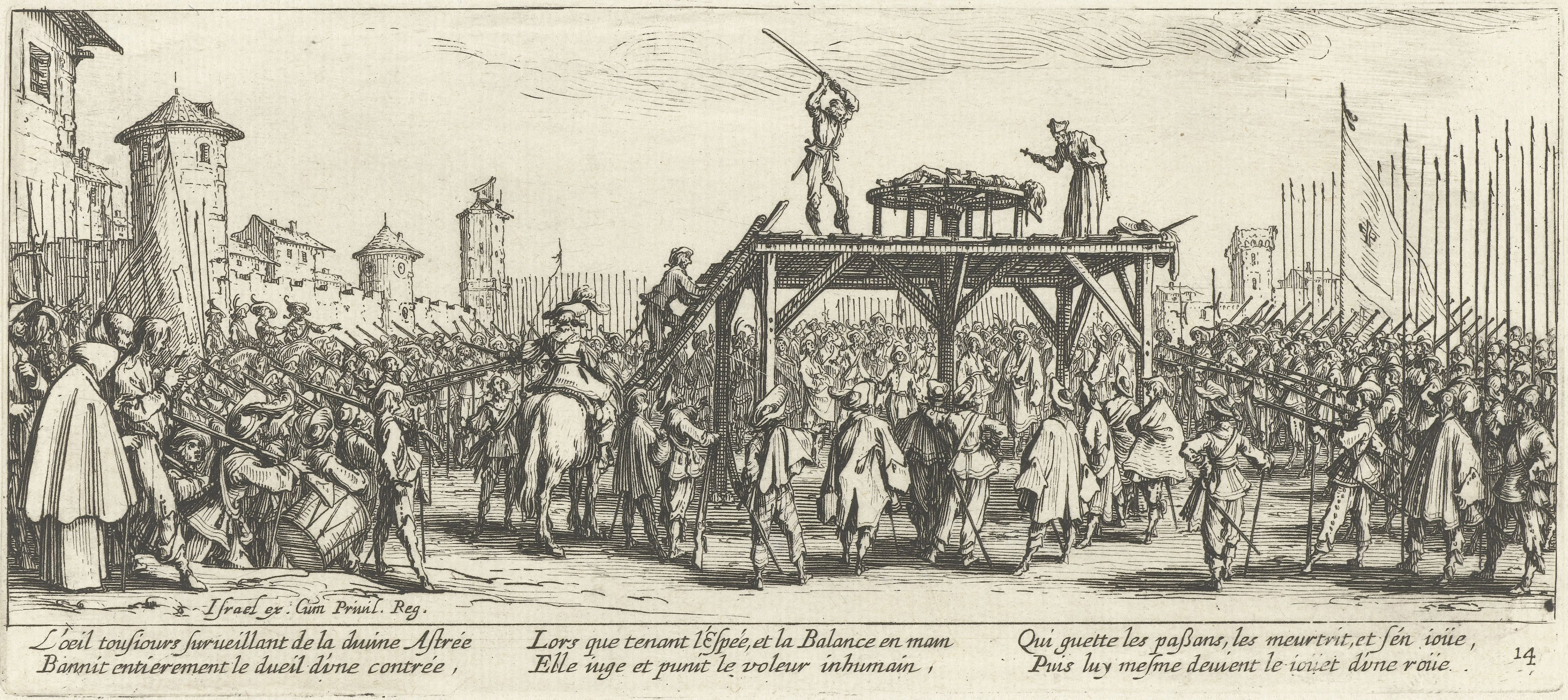
Plate 14: La roue, or Breaking wheel

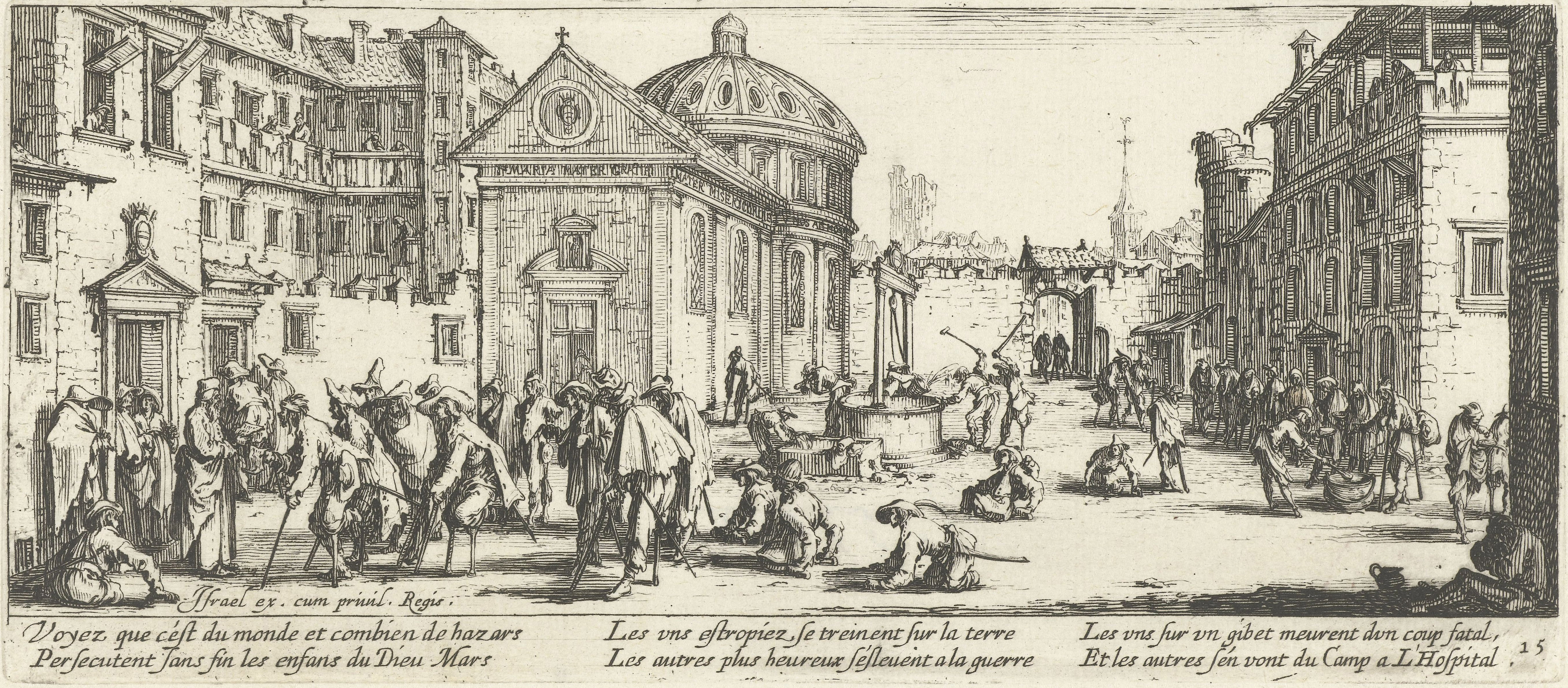
Plate 15: L'hôpital (The hospital)

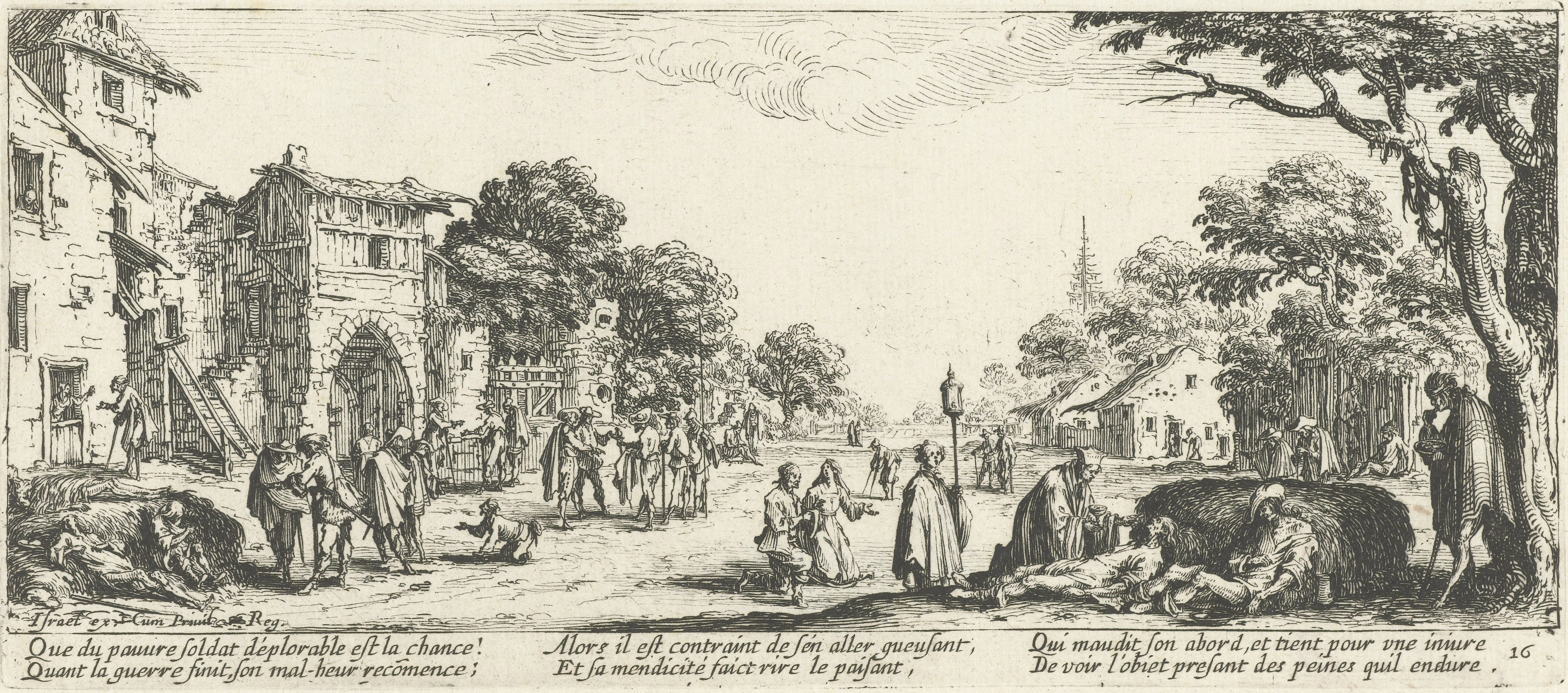
Plate 16: Les mendiants et les mourants (The beggars and the dying)

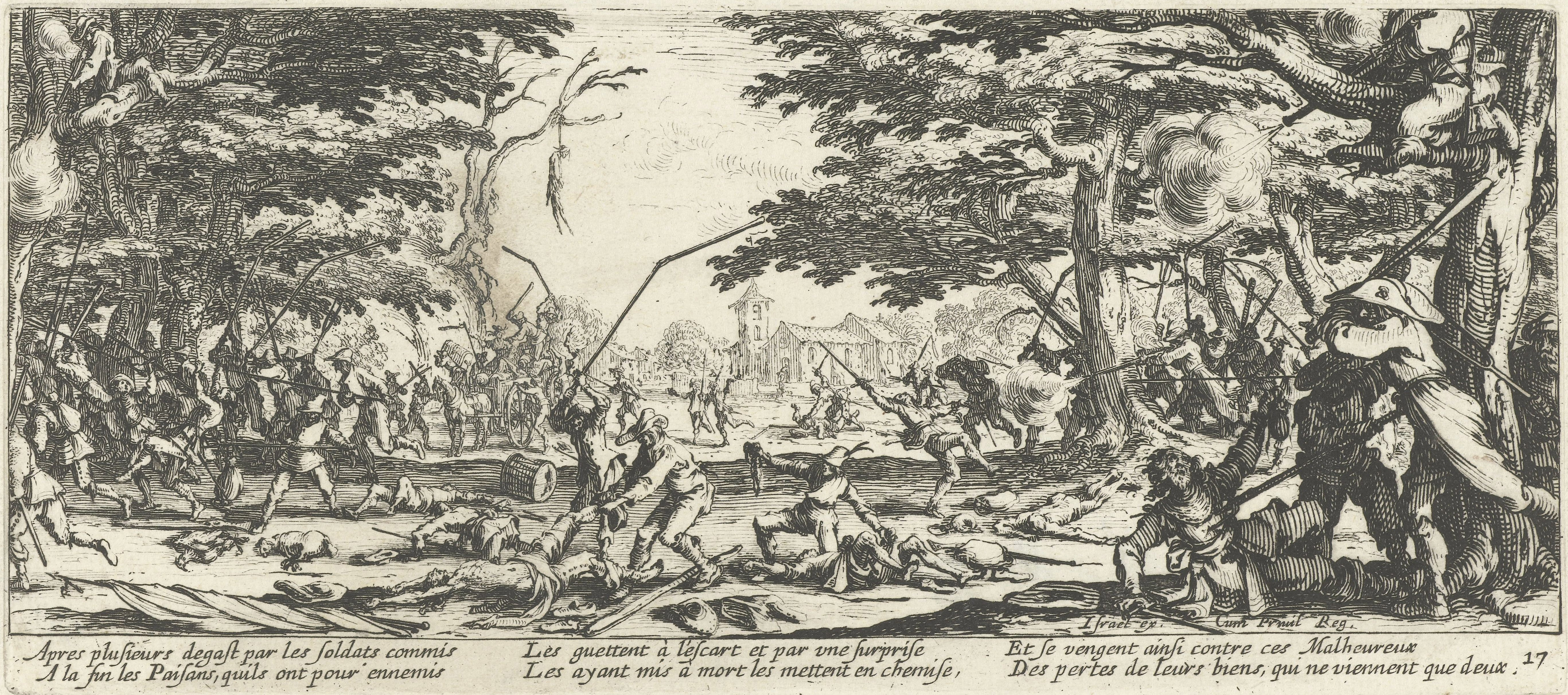
Plate 17: La revanche des paysans (The peasants fight back)

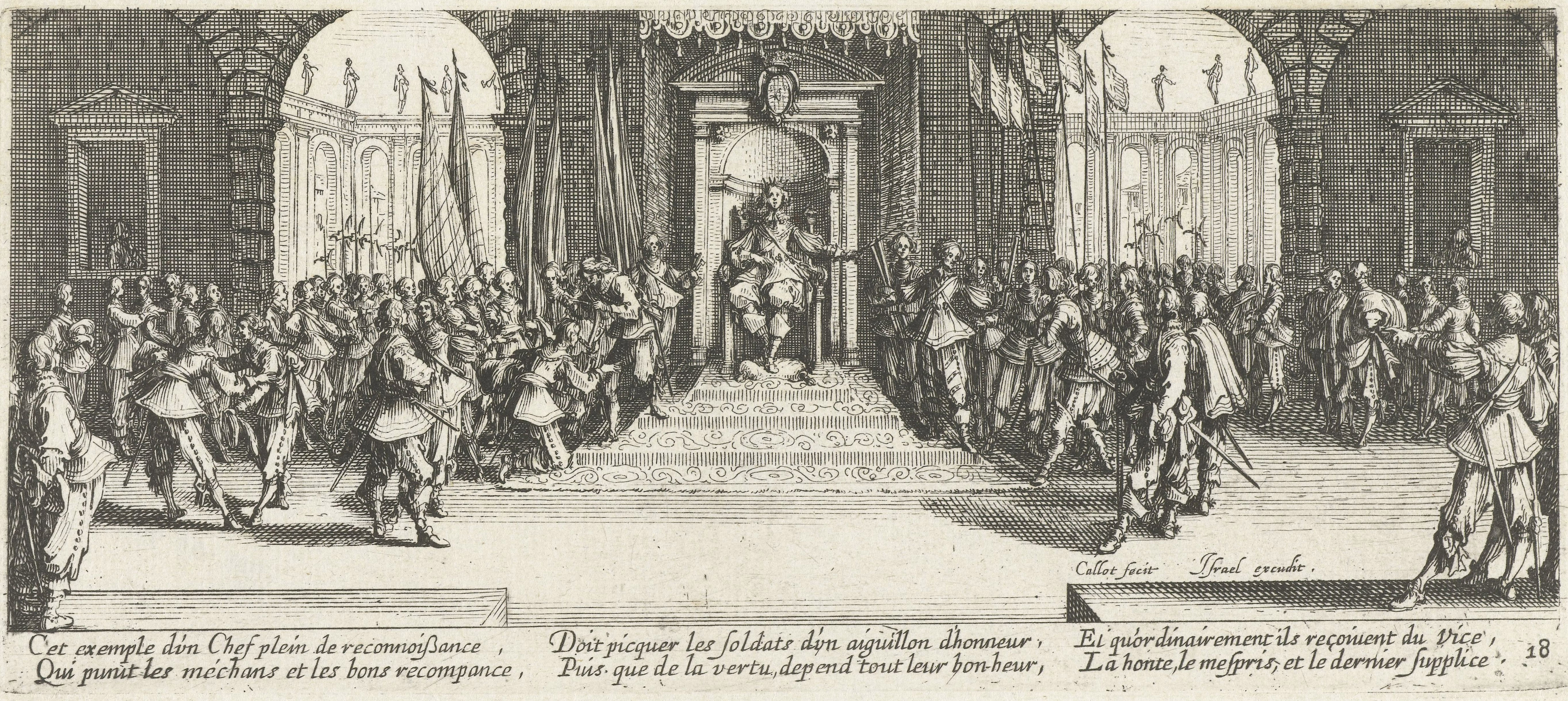
Plate 18: Distribution des récompenses (Distribution of rewards)

== Bibliography ==
- DP Becker in KL Spangeberg (ed), Six Centuries of Master Prints, Cincinnati Art Museum, 1993. ISBN 0-931537-15-0
- Hans-Jürgen Buderer. "Bilder vom Krieg als Mittel der Propaganda. „Die Schlacht am Weißen Berg“ (1620) von Pieter Snayers und „Les Misères et les Malheurs de la Guerre“ (1633) von Jacques Callot" [Images of war as a means of propaganda. ‘Die Schlacht am Weißen Berg’ (1620) by Pieter Snayers and ‘Les Misères et les Malheurs de la Guerre’ (1633) by Jacques Callot]. In: Jörg Kreutz, Wilhelm Kreutz, Hermann Wiegand (eds), Die Kurpfalz im Dreißigjährigen Krieg (1618–1648), Rhein-Pfalz-Kreis, Heidelberg, 2020. ISBN 978-3-932102-41-7, pp. 265–281.
- Fatal Consequences: Callot, Goya, and the Horrors of War, Hood Museum of Art, Dartmouth, 1990. ISBN 0-944722-04-0
- Ann Sutherland Harris, Seventeenth-century art & architecture, Laurence King Publishing, 2005. ISBN 1-85669-415-1
