= A Just View of the British Stage =

1724 engraving attributed to William Hogarth

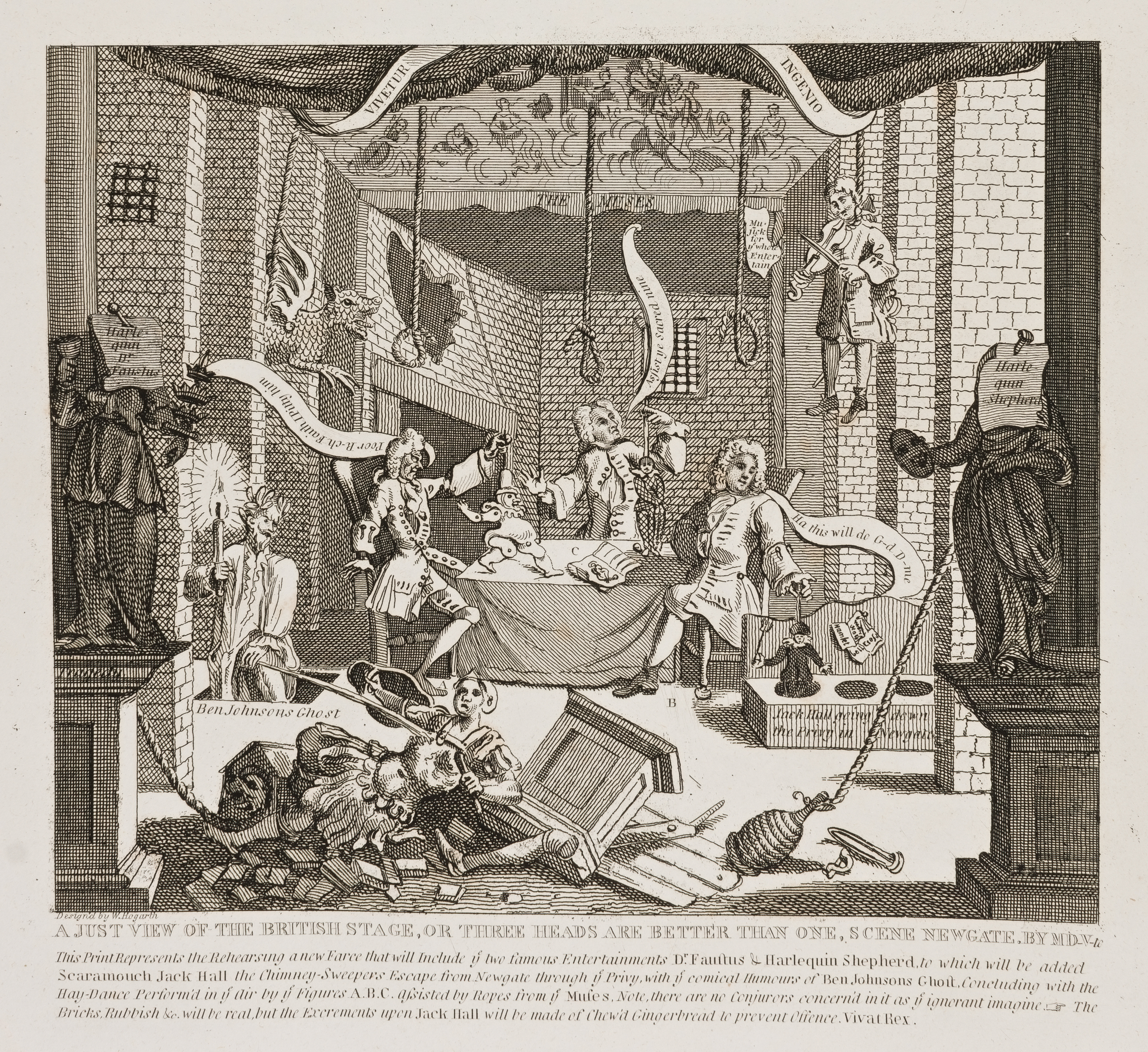
- Artist: William Hogarth
- Year: 1724

A Just View of the British Stage or Three Heads are Better than One is an unsigned 1724 engraving attributed to the English artist William Hogarth. It is a satirical view of the management of British plays and mocks the subjects as degenerate. It forms part of an attack on the tastes of the theatre which Hogarth mounted in earnest between 1723 with Masquerades and Operas and 1727 with Masquerade Ticket (and which would continue to some extent in later works including Charmers of the Age in 1740–41).

== Background ==
The staging of Harlequin Sheppard — a play by John Thurmond based around the exploits of the famed criminal and escape-artist Jack Sheppard — by the three impresarios of the Theatre Royal, Drury Lane: Colley Cibber, the actor Barton Booth, and Robert Wilks, in November 1724, spurred Hogarth into immediate action.

== Print ==
The picture was issued at sixpence, announced as Just Published in the Daily Post on 10 December 1724. It was advertised as "A Print representing the Rehearsal of a new Farce, call'd three Heads are better than one...." It shows some of the popular print conventions Hogarth usually dropped, such as speech banners and labelling of the principal characters, and has parallels to the anonymous British Stage published the same year.

In the print, the production of popularist plays are taken to an extreme by suggesting that the three impresarios are planning a spectacle which combines Dr Faustus with Harlequin Sheppard. To make it more ridiculous "comical humours" are added from Ben Johnson's Ghost and the exploits of "Scaramouch" Jack Hall, who here is depicted as escaping Newgate by lowering himself down the privy. Whether Jack Hall actually escaped this way is unknown; there are few surviving records of Hall aside from the sensationalist Memoirs of the Right Villainous John Hall, and the account of Hall in The Newgate Calendar does not mention any escape. It is possible that this was added as another absurdist element, to deride the fashion for glamorising the exploits of criminals. The caption mocks the players further suggesting that in the conclusion to the play the three men will perform the "Hay Dance" while suspended from ropes hanging from the painted depiction of the nine muses above, and concludes: "The Bricks, Rubbish &c will be real, but the Excrements upon Jack Hall will be made of Chew'd Gingerbread to prevent Offense". The concluding "Vivat Rex" (Long Live the King) suggests the satirical thrust extends past the theatre managers to what was perceived as the source of the fashion for popularist theatre, the king himself.

Throughout the scene Hogarth litters the trappings of the pantomime and objects representative of the arts obscured or defaced by the detritus of the production. There is a dragon ready to be swung in from the wings, a dog appearing from a kennel, and various farcical props scattered on the stage. Ben Johnson's Ghost wearing laurels, promised in the commentary below, rises from a trapdoor urinating on the broken statue of a Roman soldier (the soldier's detached leg may be a reference to a scene in Dr. Faustus). The statues on either side of the picture probably refer to the death of Tragedy and Comedy, their faces obscured by the titles of the entertainments under rehearsal. On the model privy pages from Shakespeare's Macbeth, Julius Caesar, Hamlet and Congreve's The Way of Ye World hang as toilet paper. Above the scene is the title, which places the action at a Newgate created by the scene-painter Devoto.

The three principals endure the brunt of Hogarth's satire. Wilks (to the left of the picture) declares "Poor R—ch, Faith I pitty him" as he sits dangling a puppet of Mr. Punch, a none-too subtle suggestion that he exceeds Rich in his desire to pander to the lowest denominator. Cibber looks heavenward to the painted Muses and entreats "Assist, ye Sacred Nine", while Booth dangles the puppet of Jack Hall and says "Ha, This will do G—d D—me". The ropes above the impresarios mirror the puppets they dangle below, and suggest that the managers will go to any lengths to entertain, even stringing themselves up in a fashion similar to the unhappy fiddler who dangles in the wings (The Music for ye What Entertainment which hangs close by, probably refers to John Gay's The What D'Ye Call It, another satire on the theatrical fashions).

== See also ==
- List of works by William Hogarth
