= John James Heidegger =

Swiss-born British impresario (1666–1749)

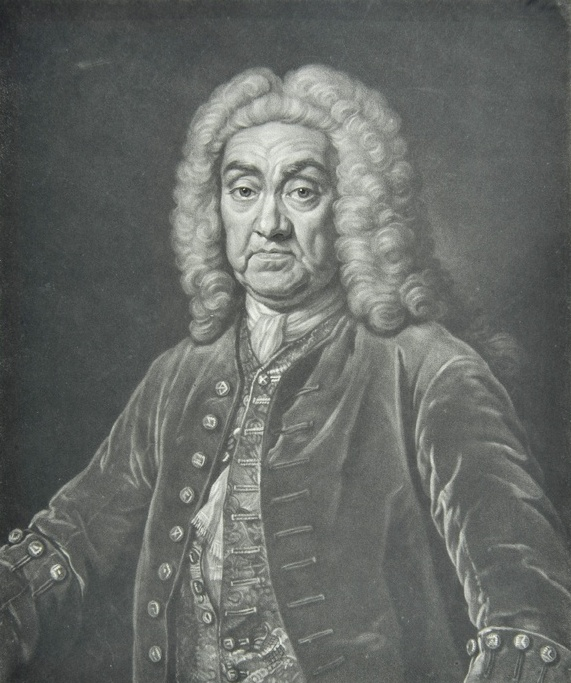
Engraved portrait of Heidegger by John Faber the Younger after a Jean-Baptiste van Loo portrait

John James Heidegger (born Johann Jacob Heidegger; 19 June 1666 – 5 September 1749) was a Swiss-born British impresario of masquerades in England in the early part of the 18th century. The son of Zürich clergyman Johann Heinrich Heidegger, Johann Jacob Heidegger came to England in 1708 as a Swiss negotiator. He failed in his undertaking, and was involved in difficulties. Heidegger subsequently enlisted in the British Army as a private in the Foot Guards, and afterwards became influential in the management of the opera. In 1709 he made five hundred guineas by furnishing the spectacle for Peter Anthony Motteux's opera Thomyris, Queen of Scythia.

From 1710 on, as part of a new commercial public entertainment, he promoted masquerade balls at the Haymarket Theatre. The fashionable world of London was enthusiastic about it and called Heidegger 'the Swiss Count'. Though moralists protested and clergymen preached against such activities, the carnivalesque phenomenon became a trend throughout 18th-century London. In 1724, William Hogarth published a satire on Heidegger in his print, Masquerades and Operas. By that time, masquerades were equally reputed for their great popularity and immoral influences. Indeed, much of the occasion's popularity resulted from the aura of sexual danger and mystery, as women of pleasure were also constantly present.

In 1727, during the coronation of King George II in Westminster Hall, he provided a spectacle of lighting 1800 candles in under three minutes. He had used a burnable connector that ran from candle to candle. According to the poet Thomas Gray, the Queen and her ladies "were in no small terror" as trains of flax were set alight and flames ran swiftly from candle to candle. The expiring flax fell in large flakes upon the heads of those beneath but did no harm. In 1728 Heidegger was called in to nurse the Opera, which throve by his bold puffing. In 1729 Handel and Heidegger were permitted to produce operas at the King's Theatre by The Royal Academy in London. "I was born," Heidegger himself said, "a Swiss, and came to England without a farthing, where I have found means to gain 5000 a year, — and to spend it. Now I defy the ablest Englishman to go to Switzerland and either gain that income or spend it there."
