= FAK =

FAK may refer to:

== People ==
- Erich Fak (born 1945), Austrian footballer
- Jakov Fak (born 1987), Croatian-Slovenian biathlete

== Other uses ==
- Fang language (Cameroon)
- Fawkner railway station, Melbourne
- Federasie van Afrikaanse Kultuurvereniginge, a South-African cultural organisation
- FK Austria Wien, an Austrian football club
- Focal adhesion kinase, a protein
- Kosovo Athletic Federation (Albanian: Federata e Atletikës së Kosovës)
- FAK, abbreviation for Forsvarsakademiet, the Royal Danish Defence College
- Fak, surname of several characters on The Bear TV series
