= Emblematical Print on the South Sea Scheme =

Print by William Hogarth

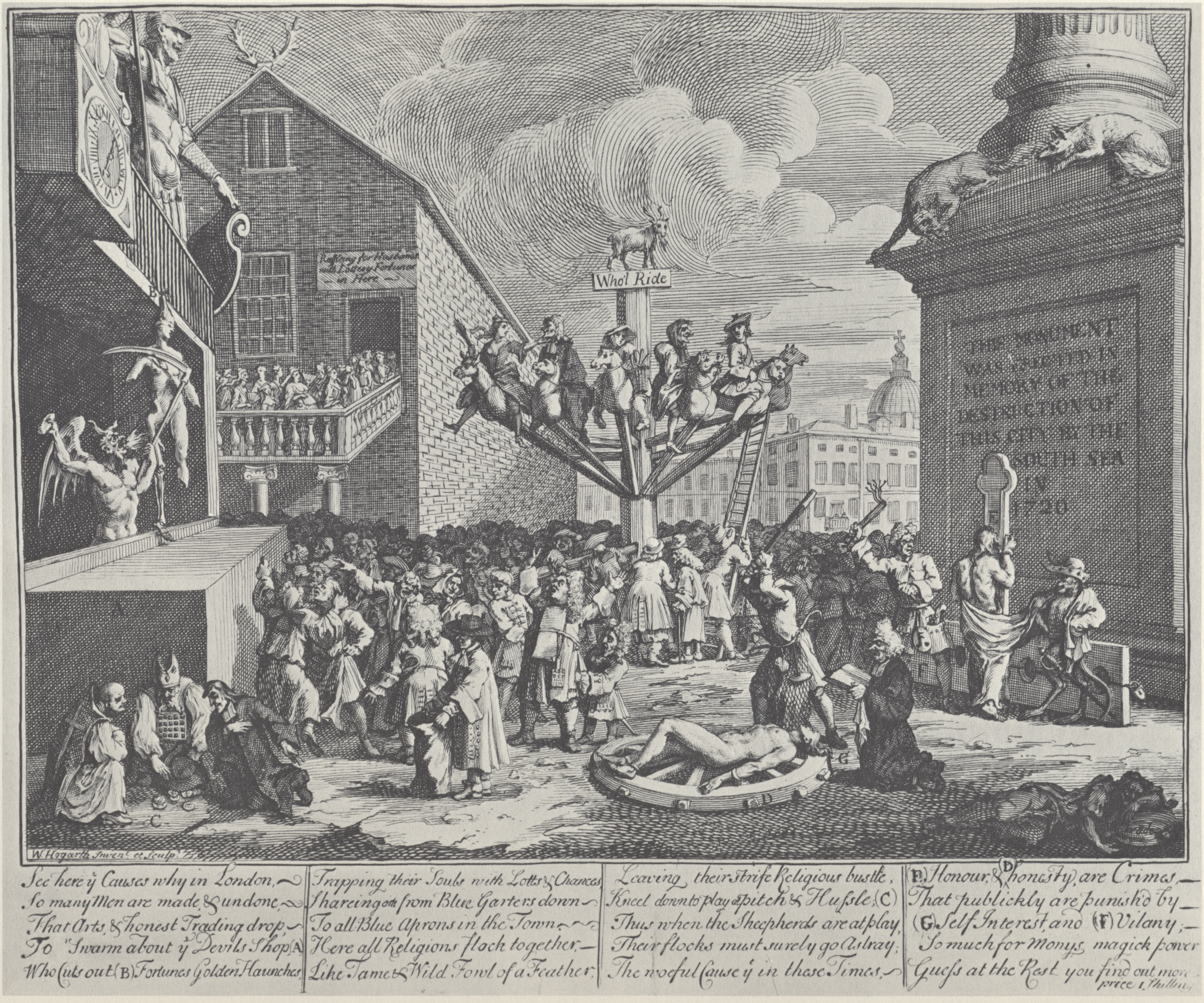
- Artist: William Hogarth
- Year: 1721
- Type: Engraving
- Dimensions: 22.2 cm × 31.8 cm (8.8 in × 12.5 in)

Emblematical Print on the South Sea Scheme (also known as The South Sea Scheme) is an early print by William Hogarth, created in 1721 and widely published from 1724. It caricatures the financial speculation, corruption and credulity that caused the South Sea Bubble in England in 1720–21. The print is often considered the first editorial cartoon or as a precursor of the form.

== Background ==
The South Sea Company was a British joint stock company founded in 1711. It was granted a monopoly to trade with Spain's South American colonies as part of a treaty during the War of Spanish Succession, in return for the company's assumption of the national debt run up by England during the war. Speculation in the company's stock led to a great economic bubble in 1720, with company's shares rising rapidly in price from around £100 to over £1,000. Many investors were ruined when the bubble burst and the value of stock in the South Sea Company crashed. Political scandal ensued when fraud among the company's directors and corruption of cabinet ministers became clear.

The event triggered several satirical engravings by foreign artists that were widely published in English newspapers, including in particular a version of A Monument Dedicated to Posterity by Bernard Picart adapted by Bernard Baron, which depicted Folly drawing Fortune in a cart while she showered a crowd of hopeful investors with bubbles of air and worthless shreds of paper rather than with the riches for which they hoped. Hogarth's print was created in 1721 as a response to the foreign engravings. The events had personal piquancy for Hogarth, given his father's detention as a debtor in Fleet Prison from 1707–12 and his early death in 1718. The South Sea Scheme is an early essay in engraving by Hogarth, who had set up on his own as a copperplate artist and painter after his apprenticeship with silver engraver Ellis Gamble came to an early end in 1720.

== Description ==
The print shows a London scene, with the Guildhall and its monumental statue of the giant Gog (or Magog) to the left, a classical column based on The Monument to the Great Fire of London to the right, and the dome of St Paul's Cathedral rising behind the buildings in the background. The base of the column bears an inscription which states: "This monument was erected in memory of the destruction of the city by the South Sea in 1720", while foxes fight above. It is no coincidence that in Hogarth's scene the monument, a symbol of the City's greed, dwarfs St Paul's, a symbol of Christian charity.

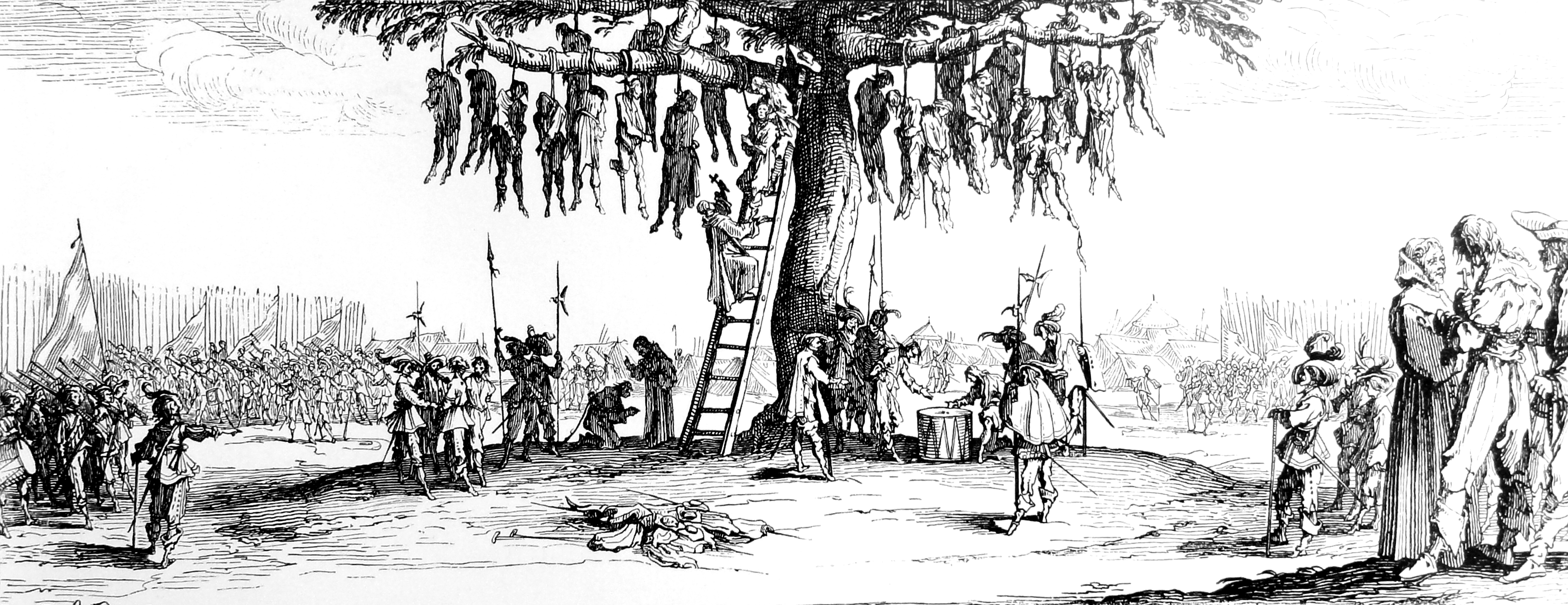
Plate 11: "La pendaison" (The Hanging), from The Miseries and Misfortunes of War

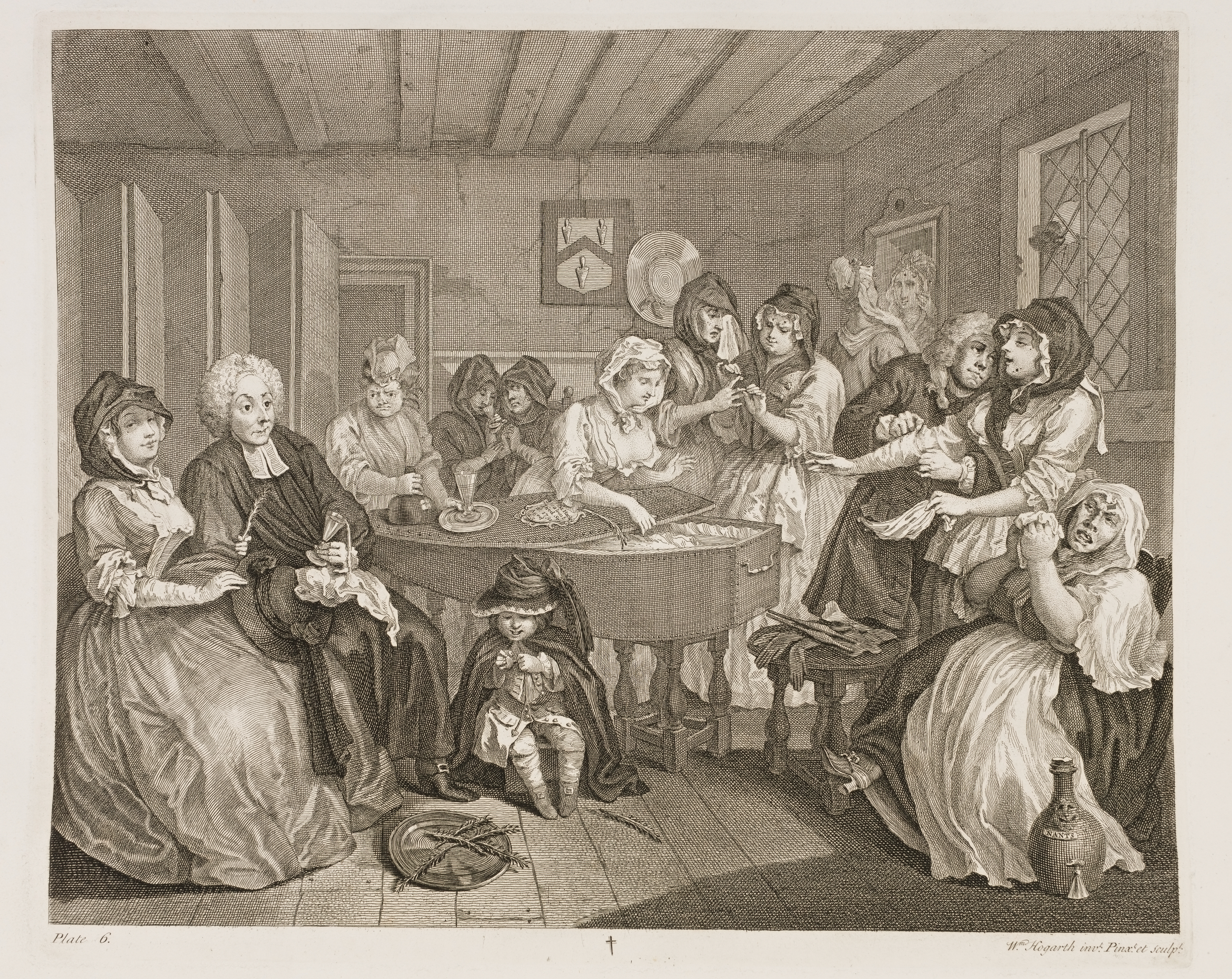
Plate 6 of Hogarth's A Harlot's Progress

The centre of the print is occupied by a financial wheel of fortune or merry-go-round ridden by figures easily recognized in society, including a whore and a clergyman on the left, then a housewife and a hunchback, and a Scottish nobleman to the right on a fat-faced horse. The ride is surmounted by a goat and the slogan "Who'l Ride" and surrounded by a jostling crowd below. To the front of the crowd, a short pickpocket rifles through the pockets of a larger gentleman. Paulson identifies the first as a caricature of Alexander Pope, who profited from the South Sea Scheme; and speculates that the other is John Gay, who, refusing to cash in enough of his stock to enable himself to have "a clean shirt and a shoulder of mutton every day for life", lost his investment and all his imagined profits. The image of the wheel is a parody of Jacques Callot's La Pendaison from the series The Miseries and Misfortunes of War, and the crowd has elements taken from his La Roue. Women line a balcony to the upper left, queuing to enter a building surmounted by stag's antlers, under a sign which offers "Raffleing for Husbands with Lottery Fortunes in Here".

The satire is accentuated by a series of allegorical figures, identified by letters explained in the verse below. To the left, a blindfolded Fortune hangs by her hair from the balcony of the Guildhall (the devil's shop) while a winged devil cuts off parts of her body with a scythe and throws the bloody chunks into the baying crowd. In the bottom left corner, distinctive clothing identifies a Catholic, a Jew and a Puritan, who are ignoring the tumultuous scene to concentrate on their game of chance. To their right, the naked figure of Honesty is broken on the wheel by Self-interest while an Anglican priest looks on; further right, Villainy – who has removed his fair mask which now hangs upside down between his legs – scourges Honour beneath the column. Standing nearby is a monkey (a symbol of mimicry or "aping") who wears a gentleman's sword and a baronial hat, and wraps himself in Honour's cloak. In the lower right corner, the figure of Trade lies asleep or dead, ignored by all.

Underneath, a verse reads:

See here y^{e} Causes why in London,
So many Men are made, & undone,
That Arts, & honest Trading drop,
To Swarm about y^{e} Devils shop, (A)
Who Cuts out (B) Fortunes Golden Haunches,

Trapping their Souls with Lotts and Chances,
Shareing em from Blue Garters down
To all Blue Aprons in the Town.
Here all Religions flock together,
Like Tame and Wild Fowl of a Feather,

Leaving their strife Religious bustle,
Kneel down to play at pitch and Hussle; (C)
Thus when the Sheepherds are at play,
Their flocks must surely go Astray;
The woeful Cause y^{t} in these Times

(E) Honour, & (D) honesty, are Crimes,
That publickly are punish'd by
(G) Self Interest, and (F) Vilany;
So much for monys magick power
Guess at the Rest you find out more.

Hogarth may have tried to sell copies of the print in 1721, but no advertisements for the issue of the print are known. In 1724, following his unsuccessful attempt to break the printmakers' monopoly by self-publishing his popular print The Bad Taste of the Town (also known as Masquerades and Operas), Hogarth sold his South Sea print, and another 1724 engraving entitled The Lottery, through the printsellers Mrs Chilcott in Westminster Hall and R Caldwell in Newgate Street. Prints were sold for 1 shilling each. Various states of the print exist; between the first and second state some minor corrections were made, including a change from "And Swarm" to "To Swarm" in the fourth line of the verse, but all other states only change the publication line to reflect a corresponding change in the printseller. The last known state, produced sometime after 1751, has the publication line erased completely. An early sketch, noted in Oppe's catalogue, omits St Paul's, the Guildhall, and various figures on the merry-go-round, shows Honesty as a woman, and has different wording for the inscriptions on the monument and raffle house.

== Reception ==
Ronald Paulson has described Emblematical Print on the South Sea Scheme as "the one original Bubble print by an English artist". John J. Richetti, in The Cambridge history of English literature, 1660–1780, states that "English graphic satire really begins with Hogarth's Emblematical Print on the South Sea Scheme".

== See also ==
- List of works by William Hogarth
