= A Critical Review of the Publick Buildings, Statues and Ornaments in and about London and Westminster =

Architectural tract on public buidlings

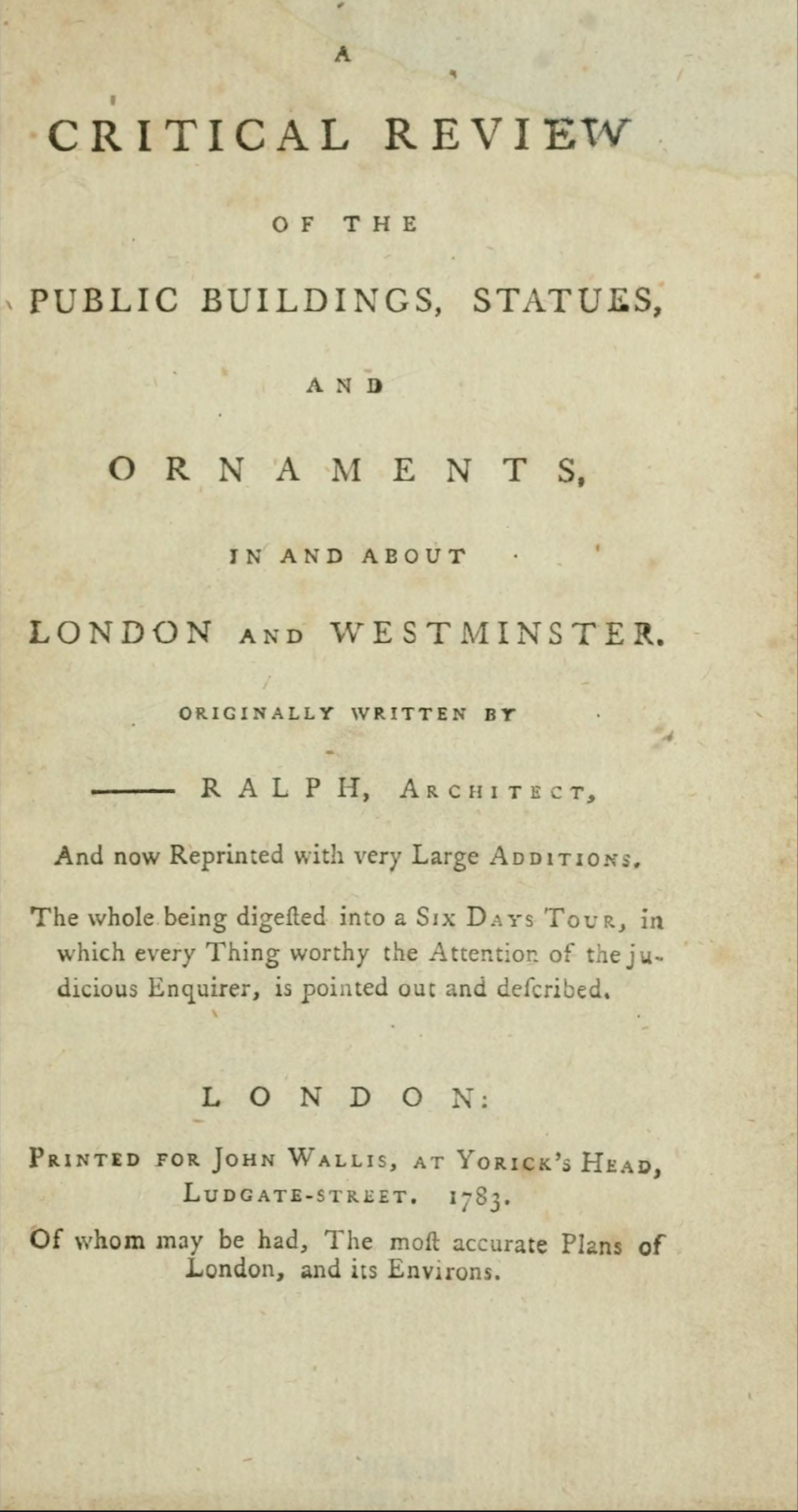
- Author: attributed to James Ralph (disputed; see Authorship)
- Language: English
- Genre: Architectural criticism, satire
- Publisher: Printed for J. S. (London)
- Publication date: 1734 (1st ed.)
- Publication place: Great Britain
- Media type: Print (octavo)
- Pages: 119 pp. (1st ed.)

A Critical Review of the Publick Buildings, Statues and Ornaments in and about London and Westminster is a 1734 architectural tract, printed anonymously in London. Expanded from a twenty-part series in the Weekly Register (13 October 1733 – 6 April 1734), it surveys public buildings, bridges, streets, and monuments in and around London. The pamphlet opens with an “Essay on Taste” advancing a Burlingtonian classicism informed by Shaftesburian aesthetics, then proceeds district by district; its tone is generally severe toward city churches and fashionable funerary monuments, while allowing occasional praise for urban compositions such as the vistas around Hanover Square. Although authorship was long disputed, the work is now commonly attributed to the poet and political journalist James Ralph.

The Review was reissued in a second edition in 1736, with later issues in 1763 and an expanded posthumous edition of 1783.

On publication it provoked a lively press controversy: weekly papers attacked it, and the exchange helped to make the merits of specific London buildings a matter of public debate. Later commentary treats the tract as polemical journalism rather than academic theory. The debate it sparked fed into mid-eighteenth-century discussions of civic taste and liberty and is often read as an early step toward the period's stylistic pluralism.

== Background and publication ==
The essays first appeared anonymously in a twenty-part series in the Weekly Register from 13 October 1733 to 6 April 1734. Ralph collected and expanded them into a 119-page octavo published anonymously in London in 1734. It was reissued in a second edition in 1736 and reprinted several times over the following decades. Later editions appeared in 1763 and 1783; the 1783 issue identifies the author as “---- Ralph, architect” and describes itself as “reprinted with very large additions.”

The tract's dedication addresses Lord Burlington and opens, “The design of this dedication is not to do honour to you, but myself; neither is it made by choice, but necessity ...”. The dedication has also been read as seeking noble endorsement for the project, and as giving verbal form to Burlington's example—if buildings could be read “as easily as books,” there would be no need of such commentary. No documentary response from Burlington is known; it remains uncertain whether he even met Ralph, and he did not publicly associate himself with the pamphlet. In relaunching the Weekly Register, Ralph nevertheless claimed that his efforts had “found admittance into the studies of the most learned” and had been “fathered by some of the noblest and most eminent names in the Kingdom.”

Ralph framed the venture as an adaptation of established periodical literary criticism to buildings, painting, and sculpture, aimed at a wider public. Conceived for a broad newspaper-reading audience, the series and pamphlet urged architects and private patrons to anticipate public verdicts on their buildings within the civic realm; the project cast patrons’ authority as something to be earned by serving the civic good, presenting London as a city that ought to reflect the aspirations of its citizens. Ralph also implied that the example he held up had not been widely heeded among peers, despite occasional “converts”.

After the pamphlet appeared, Ralph defended the project in a run of follow-up essays in the Weekly Register.

Promotion overlapped with other ventures: a notice for The Builder's Dictionary—to which Ralph contributed the introductory essay—appeared in the Review itself, and the dictionary was advertised in the Weekly Register. Publishers also issued a sister reference, the Dictionarium Polygraphicum, advertised alongside the dictionary and supplying an expanded technical vocabulary for readers.

== Contents ==
The pamphlet opens with an “Essay on Taste” attacking Burlingtonian classicism, then surveys London district by district.

- St Paul’s Cathedral – praises Wren’s dome but faults the west-front statues.
- City churches – many condemned as “Barns with steeples.”
- Squares – singles out George Street and Hanover Square for visual symmetry and “entertaining” vistas, including the portico of St George's, Hanover Square.
- Bridges & streets – censures the unfinished Westminster Bridge and the narrow approaches around Temple Bar.
- Funerary monuments – dismisses “marble pageantry” that glorifies private vanity over civic virtue; includes an attack on the Cavendish family's monument to the Duke of Newcastle in Westminster Abbey.

== Authorship debate ==
In 1898, W. A. Shaw, writing in the Dictionary of National Biography, attributed the tract to a government surveyor named James Ralph (d. 1743), citing the pamphlet's technical detail. As a result, most twentieth-century accounts of the writer James Ralph (c. 1705–1762) ignored the work. Robert W. Kenny was an exception, attributing the pamphlet to the writer James Ralph but suggesting he drew on his own surveying experience to produce it, thereby conflating details from the surveyor's career with those of the writer.

In 1969, literary historian John B. Shipley presented new evidence. He cited a Bodleian Library copy of the 1734 first edition whose dedication is signed “JAMES RALPH”, and a run of unsigned follow-up essays in the Weekly Register—which, Shipley notes, was then edited by James Ralph—in which the author calls himself the Review’s “sole author”. Taken together, Shipley argued, this evidence placed him “on firm ground” in concluding that the pamphlet was written and edited by the writer rather than the surveyor. Elizabeth R. McKinsey likewise treated the tract as Ralph's.

Later scholarship has strengthened the attribution. Historian Matthew S. R. Jenner showed near-verbatim overlap between the tract and articles Ralph published in the Weekly Register.

== Reception ==
Commentary has long noted the tract's reach: it has been called “a very popular guide to London”, and described as one of the most quoted, plagiarized, and reprinted architectural texts of the mid-eighteenth century.

The work was controversial. Contemporary weeklies—the Grub Street Journal, Weekly Miscellany, and Universal Spectator—attacked it, and at least fifty replies in articles or pamphlets followed. Its notoriety and success were linked: the publication set out to provoke public debate about architectural taste when printed criticism of specific buildings and monuments in England was rare, and it cast earlier writers as mere “routine historians”.

A letter signed “Atticus” in the Grub Street Journal (23 May 1734) opened the attack, calling the work “impudent” and complaining that, when Ralph extended his strictures to private houses, he “encroaches a little too much on the possessor's property”; critics faulted him for flouting social decorum even when he stopped short of naming patrons outright. Atticus illustrated the charge with Ralph's barb at a Grosvenor Square “Triple House”, called a “wretched attempt” seemingly designed to ensnare “some young heir” at a high price.

Ralph defended the venture as breaching deferential norms to bring particular buildings, monuments, and patrons’ choices under public scrutiny, packaged his “impudence” in a rhetoric of politeness and public improvement (defining good taste as “decency and elegance”), argued that his pamphlet was his own “property” and livelihood against which critiques “invaded” as surely as he was said to invade a gentleman's house, and maintained that taste was teachable and widely distributed. He framed his right to public criticism as an Englishman's liberty and linked “British taste” to civic freedom while adopting an anti-aristocratic, anti-cosmopolitan stance associated with the St Martin's Lane circle.

Rival papers responded in kind, and the quarrel slid into “Billingsgate” invective: the editor of the Grub Street Journal blamed the descent into personal slander on Ralph's tactics, while writers on all sides disclaimed responsibility and accused opponents of lowering standards. In subsequent Weekly Register pieces Ralph sharpened the tone—denouncing Montagu House as “a strange instance of mistaken grandeur” and needling the dean and chapter of Westminster Abbey over the sale and care of monument spaces—moves read as sensational as well as commercial. The quarrel petered out in 1735; Ralph dropped the subject thereafter, and the weekly press reverted to occasional arts pieces when politics or literary and theatrical news were thin.

Running alongside was a “language wars” thread: Ralph's lack of practical experience became a Grub Street Journal joke (“the man of imagination” who “builds high castles in the air”), the Weekly Miscellany faulted the marketing of The Builder's Dictionary, rivals accused him of hiding thin knowledge behind “favourite unmeaning terms”, and “plain dealer” jibes urged him to consult “Brother Bailey” (Nathan Bailey's Universal Etymological English Dictionary), touting Bailey's deferential antiquarianism as an alternative.

Modern scholarly assessment emphasizes the tract's polemical character rather than theoretical originality, and describes its tone as consistently severe with rare exceptions (e.g., Hanover Square). Eileen Harris judged it inconsistent and lacking in theoretical originality when measured against French academic writers such as Perrault and Laugier, a standard later criticized as inapt for a newspaper-derived work.

== Influence ==
Debate over standards broadened into first principles. The text linked civic merit to restraint—patrons were to be judged less for status display than for providing an appropriate civic environment for a public attuned to disdain luxury—and invoked Shaftesburyan aesthetics (e.g., legibility “from a prospect”) rather than any written doctrine by the patron it praised; Ralph also suggested his exemplar had found only limited adherence among peers. Opponents cast the dispute as a matter of civic liberty, arguing that taste was preference rather than authority and defending London's heterogeneous fabric as the product of gentlemen's freedom to spend as they pleased. Modern assessments read the controversy as a precursor to mid-century stylistic pluralism, with “Modern French”, Gothic, Roman classical, Grecian, and Chinese idioms coexisting among architects and patrons.

As part of that pluralizing effect, the Grub Street Journal commissioned Batty Langley (“Hiram”) to mount a counter-programme that offered one of the first widely read intellectual defences of Gothic modes and championed Nicholas Hawksmoor and “Gothic” master masons; the series also shifted the terms of debate toward “principles” grounded in mathematics and geometry and toward the training of practitioners rather than deference to public opinion.

The controversy exposed a metropolitan public pulled between an appetite for connoisseurship and a suspicion of connoisseurial pretension—a split editors found commercially useful. It both supports and complicates the idea of a mid-eighteenth-century “discovery” of the visual arts: Ralph assumed a new polite public eager to display knowledge and demand a more tasteful city, while opponents argued that Londoners preferred to leave architecture to practitioners versed in principles. As public participation grew, aesthetic consensus weakened; in a commercial culture where fashions rose and fell, Burlingtonian example became one influence among many.

== Sources ==
- Coley, W. B.; Shipley, John B. (Spring 1969). "Fielding and the "Cabal" Against Amigoni: A Rebuttal". Eighteenth-Century Studies. 2 (3): 303–311. JSTOR 2737692.
- Craske, Matthew (2004). "From Burlington Gate to Billingsgate: James Ralph's attempt to impose Burlingtonian classicism as a canon of public taste". In Arciszewska, Barbara; McKellar, Elizabeth (eds.). Articulating British Classicism: New Approaches to Eighteenth-Century Architecture. Aldershot: Ashgate. pp. 97–118. ISBN 978-0754637356.
- Harris, Eileen (1992). British Architectural Books and Writers, 1556–1785. Cambridge: Cambridge University Press.
- Jenner, Mark S. R. (2017). "Print Culture and the Rebuilding of London after the Fire: The Presumptuous Proposals of Valentine Knight". Journal of British Studies. 56 (1): 189–213. doi:10.1017/jbr.2016.115. JSTOR 26598969.
- Kenny, Robert W. (1940). "James Ralph: An Eighteenth-Century Philadelphian in Grub Street". The Pennsylvania Magazine of History and Biography. 64 (2): 218–242. JSTOR 20087279.
- McKinsey, Elizabeth R. (1973). "James Ralph: The Professional Writer Comes of Age". Proceedings of the American Philosophical Society. 117 (1): 57–66. JSTOR 985948.
- A Critical Review of the Publick Buildings, Statues and Ornaments in and about London and Westminster. London: Printed for J. S. 1734.
- —— Ralph, Architect (1783). A Critical Review of the Publick Buildings, Statues and Ornaments in and about London and Westminster. London.
- Shaw, W. A. (1898). "Ralph, James (d. 1743?)". Oxford Dictionary of National Biography (online ed.). Oxford University Press. (Subscription, Wikipedia Library access or UK public library membership required.)
- Shipley, John B. (1968). "Ralph, Ellys, Hogarth, and Fielding: The Cabal Against Jacopo Amigoni". Eighteenth-Century Studies. 1 (4): 319–338. doi:10.2307/2737854. JSTOR 2737854.
- Summerson, John (1978). Georgian London (3rd ed.). London: Barrie & Jenkins. ISBN 978-0-214-20460-9.
