= The Weekly Register (18th-century periodical) =

18th-century periodical edited by James Ralph

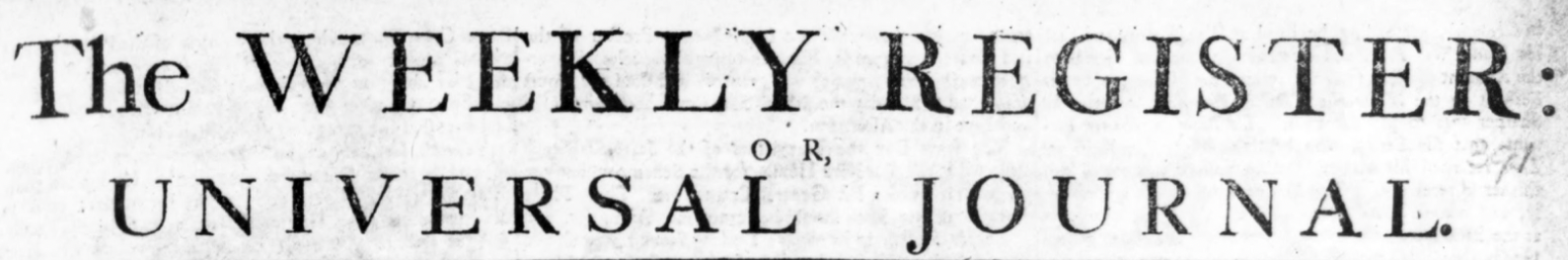
- Masthead, 22 April 1732 (The Weekly Register; or, Universal Journal)
- Type: Weekly newspaper
- Format: Four-page folio
- Publisher: Thomas Warner (1730–1735); J. Hodges (1732–1735)
- Editor: James Ralph
- Price: 2 d.
- Founded: April 19, 1730
- Ceased publication: December 6, 1735
- Language: English
- Headquarters: London, England
- OCLC number: 1022758347

The Weekly Register was a four-page London weekly published from 1730 to 1735, with antecedents cited in 1729. Issued under several mastheads before adopting The Weekly Register; or, Universal Journal in April 1732, it mixed a methodical news digest with essays and took a “Patriot” opposition line during the ministry of Robert Walpole. From early 1731 James Ralph was principal writer and de facto editor.

Beyond domestic and foreign news, shipping tables, tides, and market data, the paper mounted two high-profile cultural campaigns. Between October 1733 and April 1734 it serialized A Critical Review of the Publick Buildings, Statues and Ornaments in and about London and Westminster, casting architectural taste as a matter of public concern and civic utility. In spring 1734 it pivoted to the visual arts with a five-week critique of Jacopo Amigoni’s London paintings. These runs sparked a sustained paper-war with the Grub Street Journal (linked to Alexander Pope’s circle), notably through Batty Langley’s “Hiram” columns defending Gothic and praising Nicholas Hawksmoor, and widened into debates over liberty versus authority in matters of taste and over favouring foreign versus native artists.

Publishers included Thomas Warner and J. Hodges, with printing associated with Charles Ackers. By late 1735 the Register had wound down its arts campaign; the highest-numbered surviving issue is No. 301 (6 December 1735), and no successor series is known. Later commentators have variously criticized the paper’s mixture of miscellany and politics and, conversely, read its cultural offensives as commercial journalism aimed at shaping public taste rather than academic theory.

== Publication history ==
A version titled Weekly News and Register is cited as early as 3 July 1729. Before James Ralph’s editorship the paper regularly covered Westminster gin prosecutions: Justice John Gonson appeared in the Weekly News and Register on 3 July 1729 and 4 September 1730, and again in the Weekly Register on 30 January 1731.

By 22 May 1730 the masthead read The Weekly News and Daily Register and numbered the issue as No. 6. With issue No. 9 (12 June 1730), “Daily” was removed, shortening the title to The Weekly News and Register. With issue No. 27 (17 October 1730) the masthead was shortened again, to The Weekly Register.

The paper presented itself as a digest, gathering domestic and foreign reports from the preceding week into a single, methodically arranged summary. Alongside essays, it carried commercial matter for traders: the back page initially printed a detailed table of shipping movements—later curtailed as the paper’s balance shifted. Its closing tabular matter commonly included tide times at London Bridge, abstracts of the Bills of mortality, lists of bankrupts from the Gazette, a current stock quotation, and—more erratically—prices of grain and other commodities recorded at Bear Key.

From early 1731 Ralph assumed editorial leadership and sharpened the paper’s reformist voice. In the summer of 1731 the polemical press traded charges of ministerial subsidy: on 31 July the Craftsman alleged that the Weekly Register was among essay-papers supported by the administration; on 7 August Read’s Weekly Journal printed a denial. No direct evidence substantiates such payments.

On 22 April 1732 (issue No. 106) the paper restyled itself as The Weekly Register; or, Universal Journal, a title retained for the remainder of its run.

Between 13 October 1733 and 6 April 1734 the paper ran a twenty-part serial column titled A Critical Review of the Publick Buildings, Statues and Ornaments in and about London and Westminster, printing portions prior to separate publication. These surveyed notable buildings and public monuments and coupled aesthetic judgments with appeals to “publick” utility, using the city’s fabric to comment on office-holding, maintenance, and civic priorities; later readers have taken the series as treating rebuilding and improvement as a metaphor for moral and political reform.

In April–July 1734, the Register broadened this program. On 13 April it told “the builders of London” that “a way is open’d of introducing their performances to the world, with such advantages as may effectively excite an attention in their favour, and secure them a portion of the approbation they deserve”; on 16 April it announced a relaunch oriented to architecture and the visual arts, promising “an entertainment of the most peculiar kind” that would “be a service to the Publick in general”, even if then “particular … to the proprietors of this paper only”, and adding that “our taste is not universal as we flatter ourselves it is, and many of the first figure have no taste at all … our modern fine gentlemen are entirely out of the question.”

Over the next five Saturdays (20 April – 25 May 1734) it pivoted to history painting: setting out principles; trailing forthcoming critiques; examining Jacopo Amigoni’s frescoes at Lord Tankerville’s house in St James’s Square (Palamedes detecting Ulysses’s madness; The Prophecy of Tiresias; Ulysses with Deidamia); criticising the auditorium ceiling of the first Theatre Royal, Covent Garden—The Muses presenting Shakespeare to Apollo—a predecessor building on the site of today’s Royal Opera House; and attacking a Powis House cycle. It urged patrons not to prefer foreigners without “undeniable Evidence” of superior ability, and compared Amigoni unfavourably with Rubens (while still judging him preferable to Antonio Verrio).

Editorial leaders in June–July 1734 elaborated the rationale. On 8 June an essay titled “Of Painting” argued that “all persons, as Mr Pope well observes, have the seats of judgment in their minds, and a taste for painting descends to the meanest of the people, but there are very few among the greatest that have cultivated their minds enough to have a complete knowledge of that divine art,” adopting an Addisonian tone and closing with a warm commendation of William Hogarth—then early in his oil-painting career—which aligned the paper with the St Martin's Lane/Old Slaughter’s Coffee-House circle; on 15 June it denounced Montagu House as “a strange instance of mistaken grandeur”, its interiors “a scene of grandeur … intended to glut the eye with entertainment”; on 29 June it cast the project as extending familiar newspaper book-criticism to “building, paintings &c”, arguing that readers “seem to understand books much better than statues, architecture and painting”; and on 13 July it stated an aim to “make taste and elegancy of mind universal”. The paper’s subsequent attacks on Amigoni’s London murals coincided with Hogarth’s pursuit of the St Bartholomew's Hospital staircase commission; the Register later reported that Hogarth had secured the job.

The campaign cast private building as a civic duty: a “great city” should mirror the aspirations of its citizens, and rank conferred no authority beyond a willingness to furnish an appropriate public environment and resist luxurious display. While invoking Burlington as exemplar, the paper aligned his “taste” with Shaftesburian aesthetics—judging buildings by the legibility of major forms at a prospect and pictures by the immediate prominence of a “principal figure”, a criterion pressed in “Of Painting”. Answering criticism from the Weekly Miscellany, it defended its outspokenness in expressly political terms: “I avow myself an Englishman, and free by nature to have opinions and sentiments of my own.”

Ralph issued the architectural series as a pamphlet in 1734 and dedicated it to Lord Burlington, writing that he had “ventured” to publish “some hints” because “few have a talent of laying out their fortunes in propriety, or making their own private judgment a public ornament.” No evidence survives of Burlington’s response; he made no public endorsement, and it is uncertain whether he had even met Ralph. Follow-up installments did not spare private houses: “The Triple House on the north side [of Grosvenor Square], is a wretched attempt at something extraordinary.” Responding to complaints about offence to private owners and the Abbey’s Chapter, the paper retorted that the dead “pay for their lodging too”.

In tandem with the series, Ralph and his backers coordinated a trade compendium, The Builder’s Dictionary (1734), for which he wrote the introductory essay; the publishers also issued a sister Dictionarium Polygraphicum and advertised the two together.

By late 1735 the Register had wound down its visual-arts campaign, and Ralph’s later newspapers did not centre on the arts. The run appears to have ended soon after: the highest-numbered surviving issue is No. 301 (6 December 1735), and no later issues or successor series are documented.

=== Ownership and production ===
Imprints list the bookseller Thomas Warner as publisher, joined in April 1732 by the London Bridge bookseller J. Hodges. Printing is associated with Charles Ackers, whose shop also produced the short-lived Knight Errant and the monthly London Magazine, but the distribution of shares among proprietors remains obscure. In a crowded market the paper, like other less popular weeklies, occasionally advanced publication from Saturday to Thursday or Friday to meet postal dispatches for country circulation; the masthead sometimes carried “London”, which may indicate dual publication, although surviving runs do not yet allow firm conclusions.

=== Distribution and readership ===
The Register catered in part to a mercantile audience: early ship-news tables were presented as “acceptable to such as are concerned in Trade, or who have Friends on Voyages”, and closing tabular matter regularly provided practical commercial data. In the 1730s the Post Office was the principal channel for dispersing printed material, with local redistribution through Customs and Excise officers; similar arrangements probably applied to newspapers, though surviving records are incomplete.

== Content and themes ==
Essays frequently employed satire, moral instruction, and political critique, with particular attention to corruption, patronage, and social affectation. Contributors often used fictionalized urban characters and stylized moral types to dramatize these concerns, especially in critiques of the political culture surrounding Walpole’s ministry. The paper was one of a small number of weeklies—including the Weekly Medley and the Grub Street Journal—that devoted extended attention to contemporary literature. Its criticism frequently applied Shaftesburian criteria (for example, immediate recognition of a work’s “principal figure”) and evaluated architecture by the clarity of dominant forms viewed at a distance. Set against that, critics of the Register insisted on stylistic pluralism—Gothic, “modern French”, Roman, Grecian, even Chinese—resisting any absolute canon and tying aesthetic freedom to civic liberty.

James Ralph was the principal contributor and de facto editor; other writers likely participated, with Henry Fielding sometimes suggested, though definitive evidence is absent.

== Reception and contemporary debate ==
=== Contemporary reception (1733–1735) ===
Reception unfolded against a long-running animosity between Alexander Pope and James Ralph: after the first edition of The Dunciad (1728), Ralph had published Sawney (1728), and Pope had answered in the 1729 Dunciad Variorum, identifying Ralph in Book III. The Grub Street Journal—described as inspired, and probably funded, by Pope in its first year—followed Pope’s lead in making Ralph and the Register recurring objects of satire. Its contributors riffed on Pope’s couplet (“Silence, ye wolves! while Ralph to Cynthia howls, / And makes Night hideous—answer him, ye owls.”) and adopted taunting personae such as “Timon the Owl-Hater”.

Framing the dispute as liberty versus authority—arguing that “taste” rested on preference and that London’s heterogeneous streetscape expressed English gentlemen’s freedom to spend as they pleased—the Journal mounted a sustained counter-campaign. From mid-1734 into early 1735 it ran near-weekly replies by the architect Batty Langley, writing as the freemasonic “Hiram”, rebutting the Register’s architectural and art criticism. “Hiram” defended Gothic forms and praised Nicholas Hawksmoor—hailing St Anne’s, Limehouse as “a most surprising beautiful structure”—while lampooning the Register’s phrasing, notably its call for an “octangular square”. He also challenged the notion that Inigo Jones and Lord Burlington had set a binding canon for public architecture, urging a plural, tolerant metropolis; in this telling, the city’s “myriad differing tastes” were a fitting outcome of civic liberties, not a defect to be corrected by a single standard. To widen the debate, on 8 May 1735 the Journal republished Captain Valentine Knight’s 1666 rebuilding proposal; Craske judges the “Hiram” series the first widely read defence of Gothic against Ralph’s Shaftesbury-inspired attacks on the “gothique”.

Other weeklies joined in—among them the Weekly Miscellany and the Universal Spectator—and the controversy generated at least fifty published responses in articles or pamphlets.

The Journal also worked to deflate Ralph’s authority. It exploited public suspicion of “instant experts” (a vein familiar from James Bramston’s The Man of Taste (1733)), dubbed Ralph “the man of imagination”, and joked that a poet’s architecture “builds high castles in the air”. It mined his slips on Jacopo Amigoni to paint him as a pretentious connoisseur, concluding that this “man of taste knows nothing of the art of painting but the terms” (27 June 1734); after the Register misidentified several scriptural subjects, “Bavius”—an editorial persona of the Grub Street Journal—told the critic to “read the Bible”, a jab at “free-thinking Ralph” that George Vertue recorded with amusement. To undercut the paper further, the Journal later claimed Ralph was merely ventriloquizing the views of the portrait painter John (“Jack”) Ellys, a Slaughter’s Coffee-House regular (3 September 1735).

A complementary line of attack targeted vocabulary and commercialization. Styling themselves “plain dealers”, the editors told Ralph to consult “Brother Bailey” (A Universal Etymological English Dictionary, 1733) and touted Bailey’s deferential Antiquities of London and Westminster as a safer guide than the Register’s Review; a satirical verse (6 June 1734) joked that wisdom in every science came from mastering “terms of art”—and from Bailey’s Dictionary. The mockery also traded on Ralph’s own marketing—The Builder’s Dictionary promised to explain architectural “terms of art”—while his publishers’ sister Dictionarium Polygraphicum elaborated the lexicon with a long entry on “expression” (after Charles Le Brun) and multiple variants of chiaroscuro (“Claro obscuro”, “Clair Obscure”, “Chiaro scuro”).

=== Later assessments ===
The historian Jeremy Black quotes the literary scholar John B. Shipley’s description of the paper as having “a split personality: part miscellaneous, part political”, but questions such judgments as anachronistic, arguing they apply modern critical criteria and overlook the production imperatives of eighteenth-century newspapers. The art historian Matthew Craske similarly reads the 1733–1735 campaign as provocative, commercial journalism aimed at creating a public for elite taste rather than a consistent theoretical treatise, and he notes its wide mid-century afterlife in quotation and reprint, including a revised 1783 edition of the pamphlet derived from the series.

The architectural historian Eileen Harris faulted Ralph’s Critical Review for privileging “liberty” over “reason”, and for ideas that “spring from sensory impression and therefore are not universally valid”, measuring it against French academic theorists such as Perrault, Cordemoy, and Laugier. Craske counters that judging controversial newspaper writing by those theoretical standards is elitist and anachronistic; as journalism, the campaign sought to shape public taste and in practice did so, given its extensive quotation, plagiarism, reprinting, and revision.

Craske also highlights a tension between the Register’s Burlingtonian (Palladian) classicism in architecture and its St Martin’s Lane affinities in painting: the paper upheld “manly” classical simplicity while socializing with a circle that prized ornate “modern French” décor. On this reading, the Register deployed Burlington as an exemplar to shame lavish patrons and to mobilize bottom-up public judgment on taste—casting nobles as answerable to a coffee-house public—while the Amigoni campaign coincided with Hogarth’s bid for (and, as the paper later reported, attainment of) the St Bartholomew’s Hospital staircase commission. He further links the Register’s 8 June 1734 “Of Painting” essay to Hogarth’s “Britophil” epistle (St James’s Evening Post, 7 June 1736), treating the former as a likely model.

More broadly, Craske cautions against treating Burlingtonian classicism as the period’s normative ideology: the mid-1730s controversy shows how contested “taste” was in practice. In retrospect, the episode reads as an early flashpoint in a liberal, commercially driven pluralism of taste, not a settling around a single classicist norm. As a barometer of metropolitan taste, it reveals a public pulled between acquiring connoisseurship and mistrusting connoisseurial pretension—polarization the editors on both sides learned to commercialize—and marks architecture’s shift into a matter of public debate beyond patrons, with styles multiplying, “classicism” diversifying, and Burlington’s example becoming only one influence among many.

== Sources ==
Black, Jeremy (2001). The English Press 1621–1861. Stroud: Sutton. ISBN 978-0-7509-2524-2.

Coley, W. B.; Shipley, John B. (Spring 1969). "Fielding and the "Cabal" Against Amigoni: A Rebuttal". Eighteenth-Century Studies. 2 (3): 303–311. JSTOR 2737692.

Craske, Matthew (2004). "From Burlington Gate to Billingsgate: James Ralph's attempt to impose Burlingtonian classicism as a canon of public taste". In Arciszewska, Barbara; McKellar, Elizabeth (eds.). Articulating British Classicism: New Approaches to Eighteenth-Century Architecture. Aldershot: Ashgate. pp. 97–118. ISBN 978-0754637356.

Harris, Eileen (1992). British Architectural Books and Writers, 1556–1785. Cambridge: Cambridge University Press.

Harris, Michael (1987). London Newspapers in the Age of Walpole: A Study of the Origins of the Modern English Press. Rutherford, NJ: Fairleigh Dickinson University Press; Associated University Presses. ISBN 978-0-8386-3273-4.

Jenner, Mark S. R. (2017). "Print Culture and the Rebuilding of London after the Fire: The Presumptuous Proposals of Valentine Knight". Journal of British Studies. 56 (1): 189–213. doi:10.1017/jbr.2016.115. JSTOR 26598969.

Mari, William Thomas (2015). "Writer by Trade: James Ralph's Claims to Authorship". Authorship. 4 (2). doi:10.21825/aj.v4i2.1439.

Nichols, John (1812). Literary Anecdotes of the Eighteenth Century. Vol. 4. London: J. Nichols & Son. pp. 95–96.

Okie, Laird (1991). Augustan Historical Writing: Historiography in England, 1688–1750. Lanham, MD: University Press of America.

Pope, Alexander (1729). The Dunciad. With Notes Variorum. London. OCLC 606494274.

Ralph, James (1728). Sawney: An Heroic Poem. Occasion'd by the Dunciad. London: J. Roberts. OCLC 9605970.

Shipley, John B. (1968). "Ralph, Ellys, Hogarth, and Fielding: The Cabal Against Jacopo Amigoni". Eighteenth-Century Studies. 1 (4): 319–338. doi:10.2307/2737854. JSTOR 2737854.

Warner, Jessica; Ivis, Frank (2001). "Informers and Their Social Networks in Eighteenth-Century London: A Comparison of Two Communities". Social Science History. 25 (4): 563–587. JSTOR 1171626. PMID 18792462.

"The Weekly Register; or, Universal Journal". Penn State University Libraries Catalog. OCLC 1022758347.

"The Weekly Register, Issues 6–301 (1730–1735)". Internet Archive.
