= Amigoni =

Amigoni is an Italian surname from Lombardy, ultimately from Latin amīcus 'friend'. Notable people with the surname include:

- Caterina Amigoni Castellini (fl. 1747–1773), Italian pastellist
- Jacopo Amigoni (1682–1752), Italian late-Baroque/Rococo painter
- Ottavio Amigoni (1606–1661), Italian Baroque painter

== See also ==
- Amicone
- Amighetti
