= Keystone (architecture) =

Wedge-shaped stone at the apex of a masonry arch

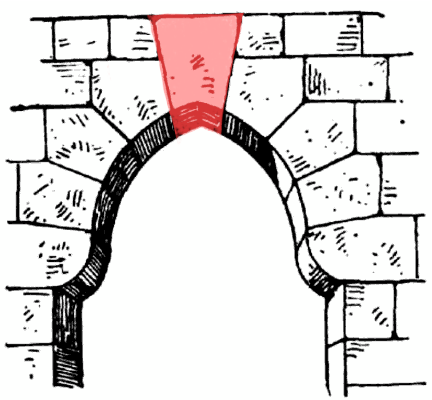
The keystone (shown in red) of an arch

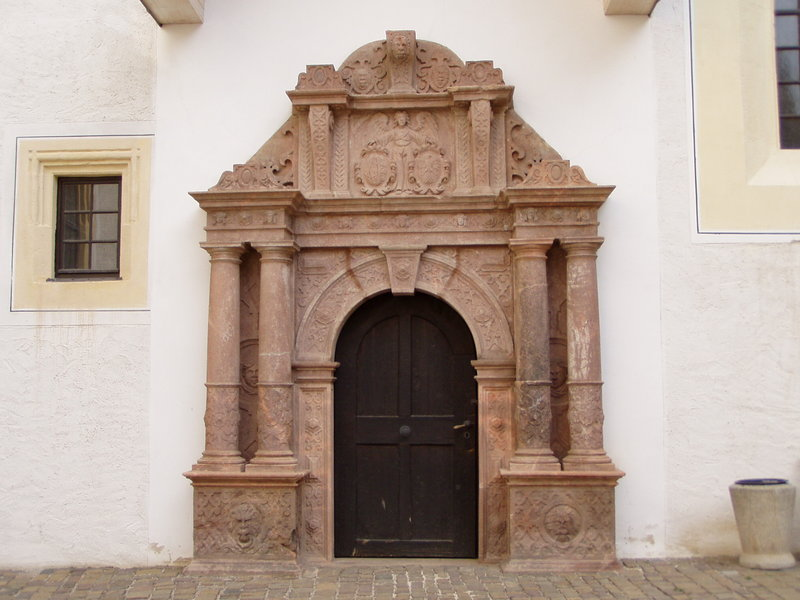
Dropped keystone at Colditz Castle

A keystone (or capstone) is the wedge-shaped stone at the apex of a masonry arch or typically round-shaped one at the apex of a vault. In both cases it is the final piece placed during construction and locks all the stones into position, allowing the arch or vault to bear weight. In arches and vaults (such as quasi-domes) keystones are often enlarged beyond the structural requirements and decorated. A variant in domes and crowning vaults is a lantern. A portion of the arch surrounding the keystone is called a crown.

Keystones or their suggested form are sometimes placed for decorative effect in the centre of the flat top of doors, recesses and windows, so as to form an upward projection of a lintel, as a hallmark of strength or good architecture.

Although a masonry arch or vault cannot be self-supporting until the keystone is placed, the keystone experiences the least stress of any of the voussoirs, due to its position at the apex. Old keystones can decay due to weathering and vibration, a condition known as bald arch.

== Architecture ==
In a rib-vaulted ceiling, keystones commonly mark the intersections of any two or more arched ribs. For aesthetics, keystones are often larger than ribs in vaults and many of the voussoirs (arch stones) in arches, or embellished with a boss.

A "dropped keystone" is one where the keystone projects lower than the other voussoirs. Following Giulio Romano, Mannerist architects of the 16th century often designed arches with enlarged and slightly dropped keystones, as in the "church house" entrance portal at Colditz Castle. Numerous examples are found in the work of Sebastiano Serlio, a 16th-century Italian Mannerist architect.

== Symbolism and metaphor ==
Due to its central position in an arch, the keystone has historically been regarded as symbolically more important than other voussoirs. It is perceived as the binding stone whose weight holds the two halves of an arch together. Beyond its structural utility, the keystone evolved into an important ornamental element, part of a long tradition of using decoration to emphasize portals and wall openings. While keystones were not widely utilized as prominent decorative features until the mid-18th century, their inclusion in architectural pattern books influenced by designers such as Inigo Jones (published by figures including William Kent (1744) and Batty Langley (1746)), transformed them into symbols of prominence and social status. The elaboration of a keystone over a doorway became a conventional way of signalling that a building represented not merely shelter but the elevated standing of its occupants.

In postmodern practice, particularly in the work of Michael Graves, the keystone has been abstracted from its position on an arch and employed as a metaphor that, in Brush's characterization, "seems to have become" an expression of order, authority, and government. Graves also used the keystone to represent the passageway or portal between built form and landscape, and as a device for figuratively joining separate communities or cultural entities. For example, in the Fargo–Moorhead Cultural Center bridge, (missing) keystones reflect the voussoir's original function of uniting the two sides of an arch.

The word keystone is often used metaphorically for an essential part on which the whole depends. The Commonwealth of Pennsylvania calls itself the "Keystone State", because during early American history it held a crucial central position among the Thirteen Colonies geographically, economically, and politically, like the keystone in an arch. A keystone is a symbol of Pennsylvania, being used in the logos of many Commonwealth government departments, state route signs, and on license plates, and the Shoulder Sleeve Insignia of the Pennsylvania National Guard's 28th Infantry Division (United States), a Red Keystone, first adopted during World War I in October 1918.

Referring to the Book of Mormon, Joseph Smith said that it "was the most correct of any book on earth, and the keystone of our religion, and a man would get nearer to God by abiding by its precepts, than by any other book." Ezra Taft Benson, the 13th president of the Church of Jesus Christ of Latter-day Saints, said it "is my prayer that the Book of Mormon may become the keystone of our lives."

In freemasonry, a keystone withe letters HTWSSTKS ("Hiram The Widow's Son Sent To King Solomon") is a mark of the Grand Master and reminds of the story of Hiram Abiff.

== Gallery ==
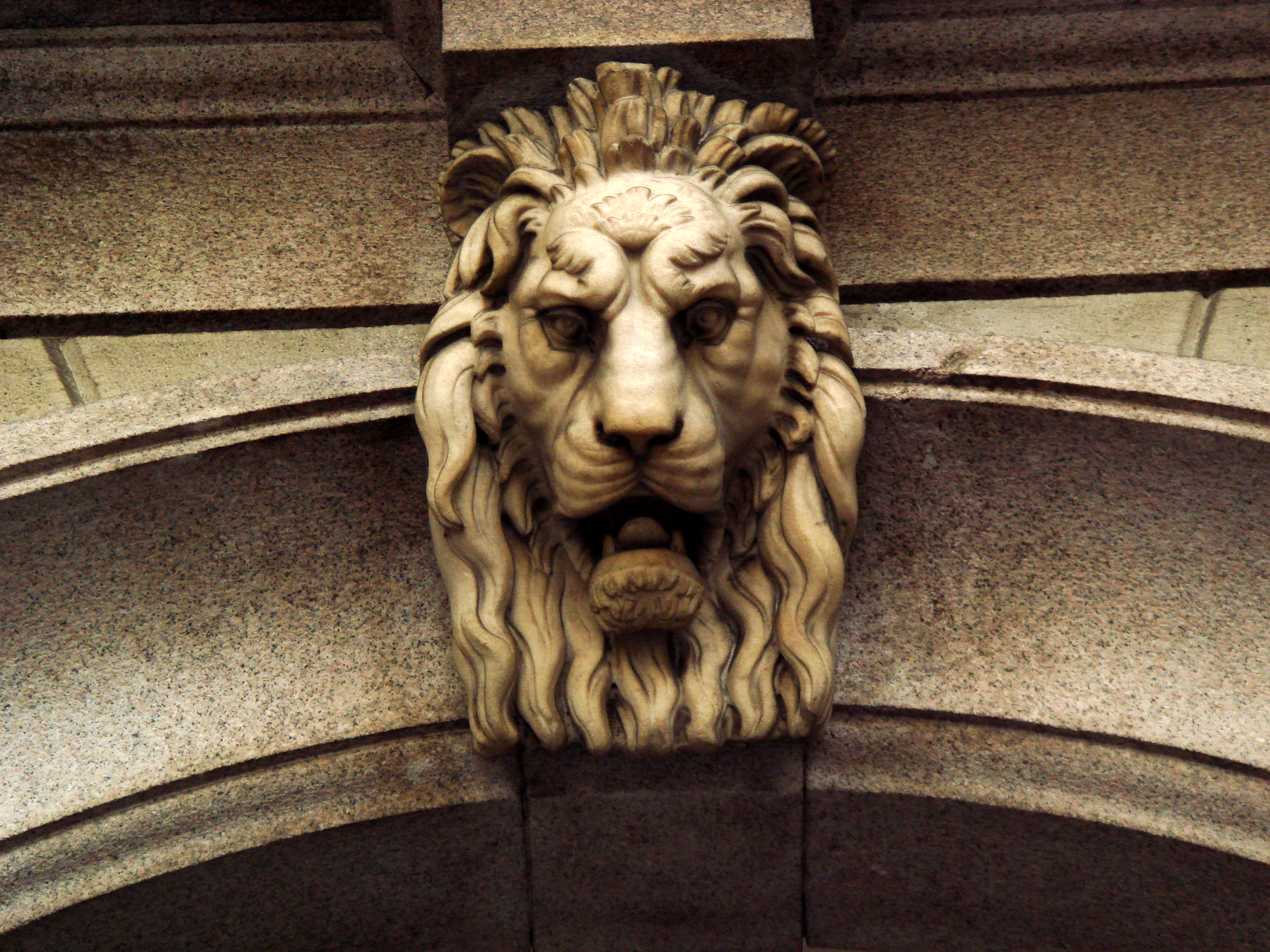
Keystone from the palazzo Borgazzi (Milan, Italy)

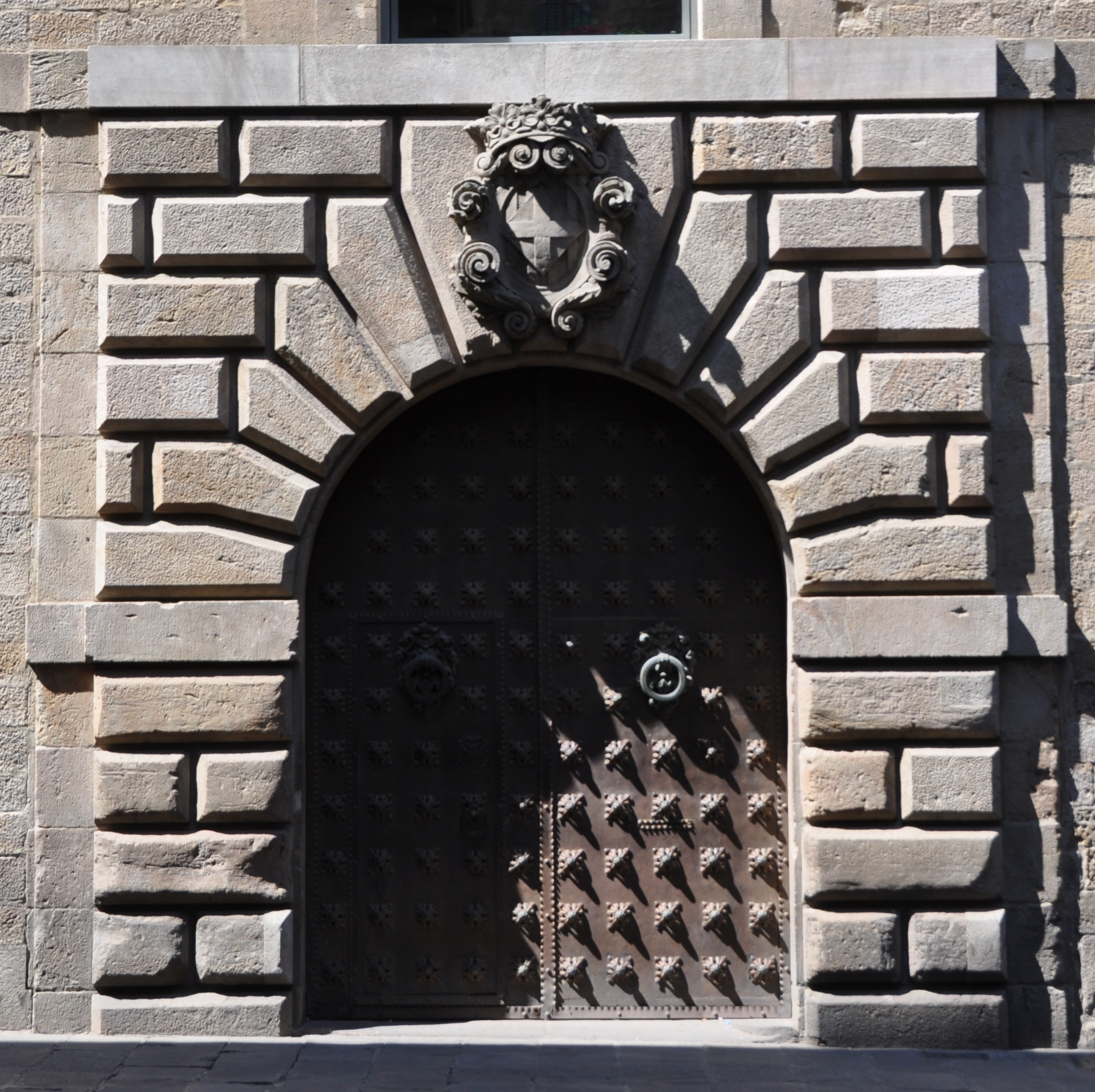
Keystone much enlarged for decorative effect, and carrying a coat of arms, Barcelona

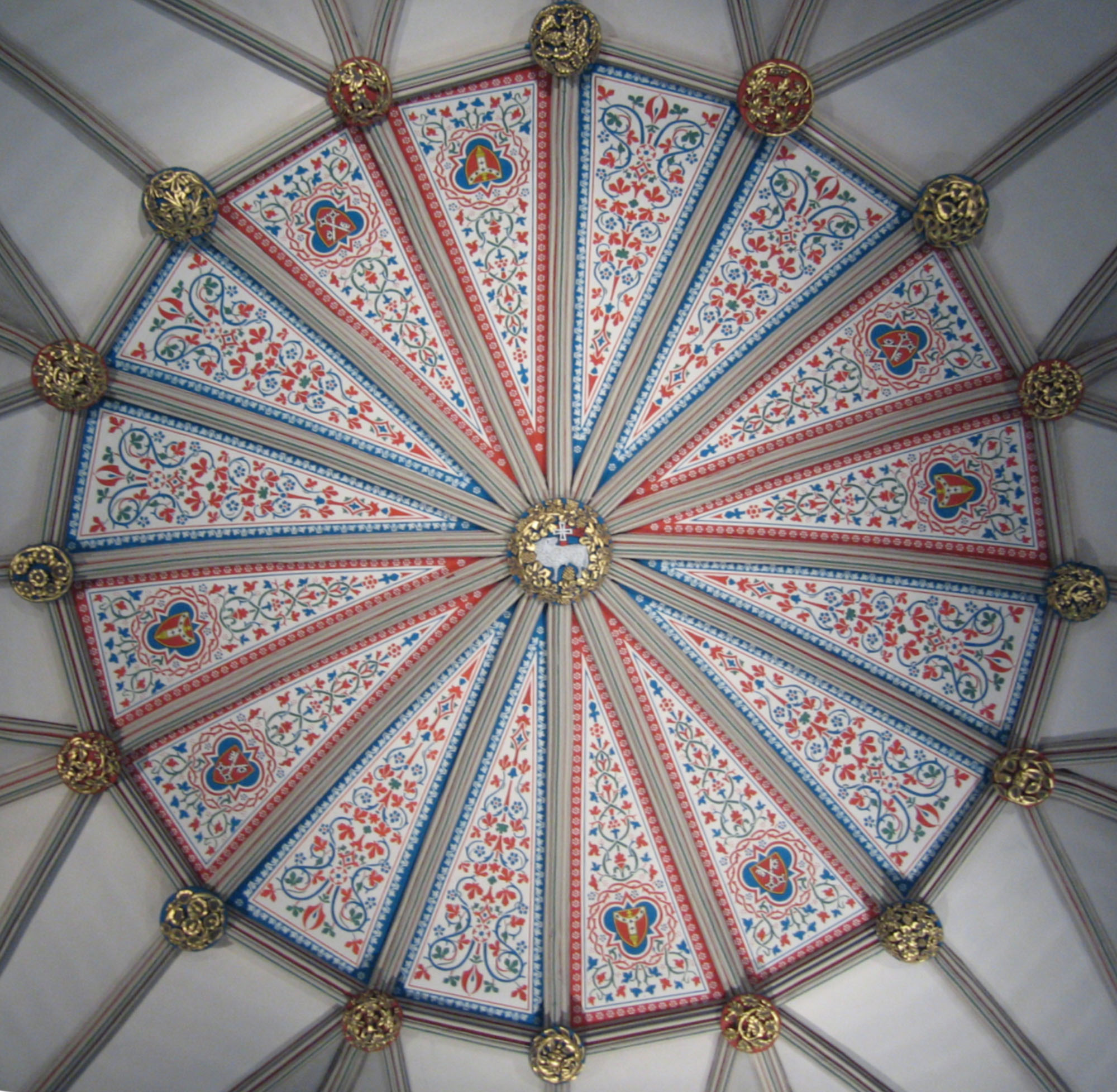
The York Minster Chapter House rib-vault ceiling with central and peripheral keystones

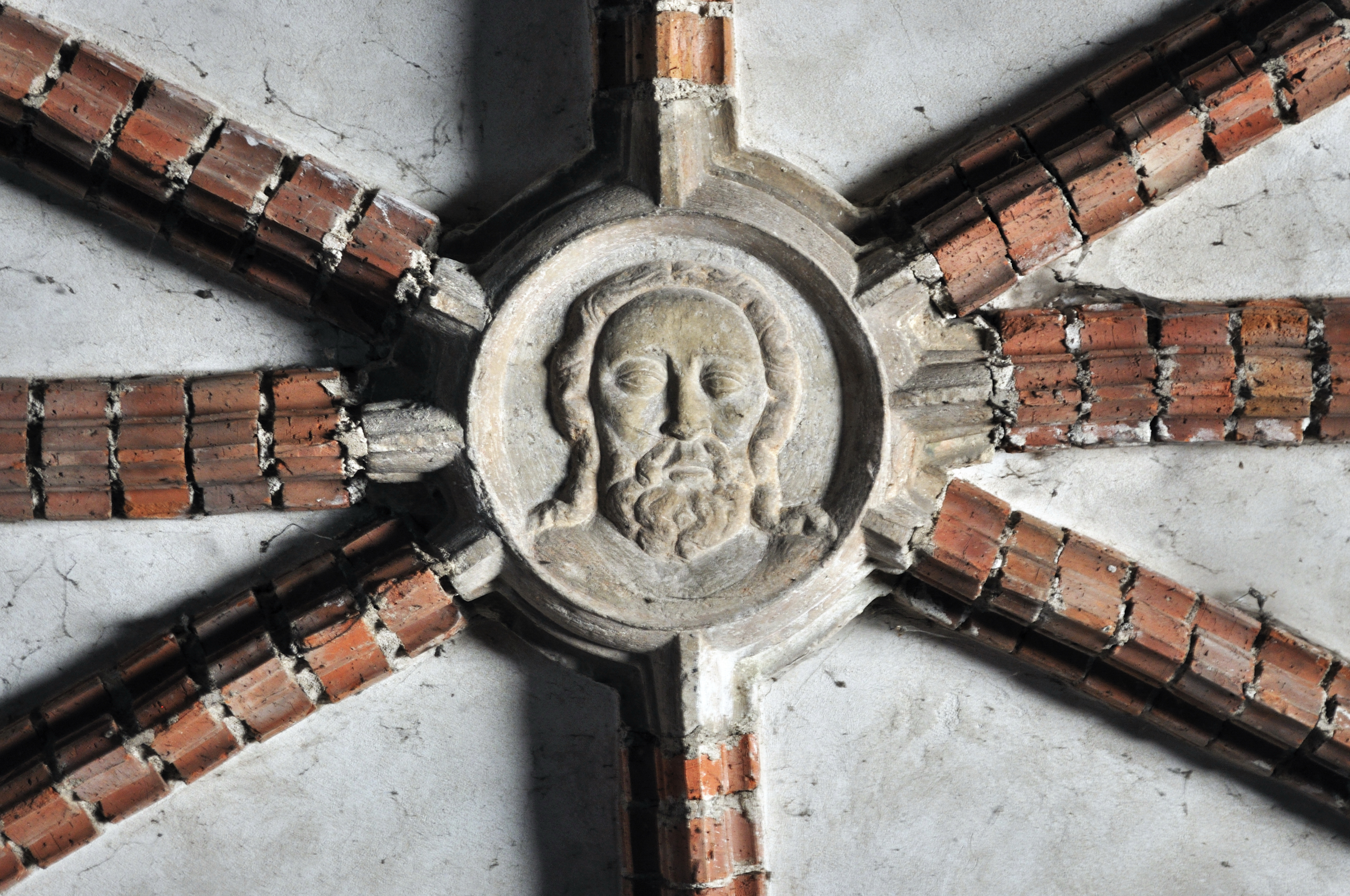
A boss depicting Jesus Christ decorates the keystone in the rib-vaulting at Chapel of St. Anne in Malbork, 14th century.

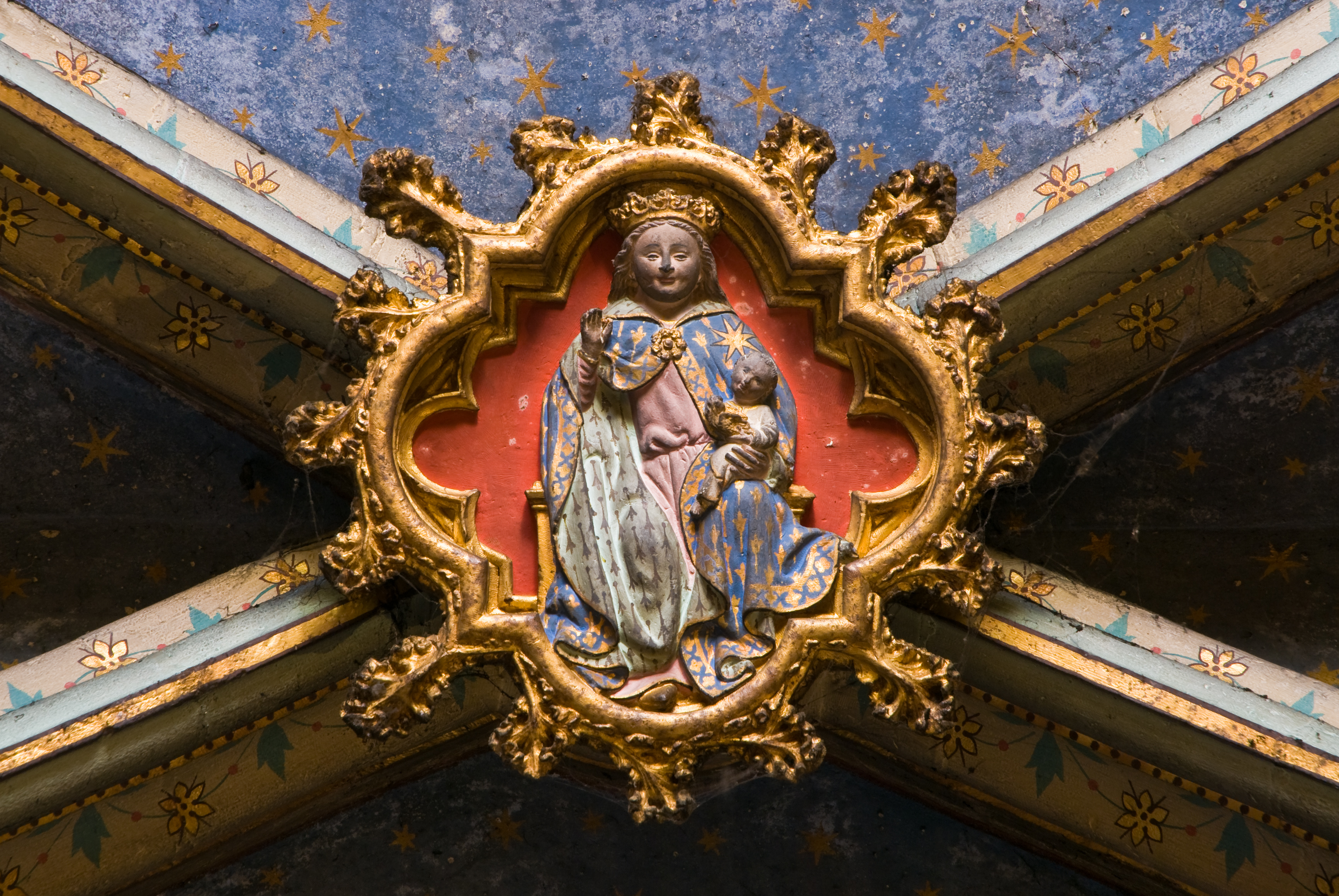
Bossed keystone in the ceiling of an apse chapel (Toulouse Cathedral)

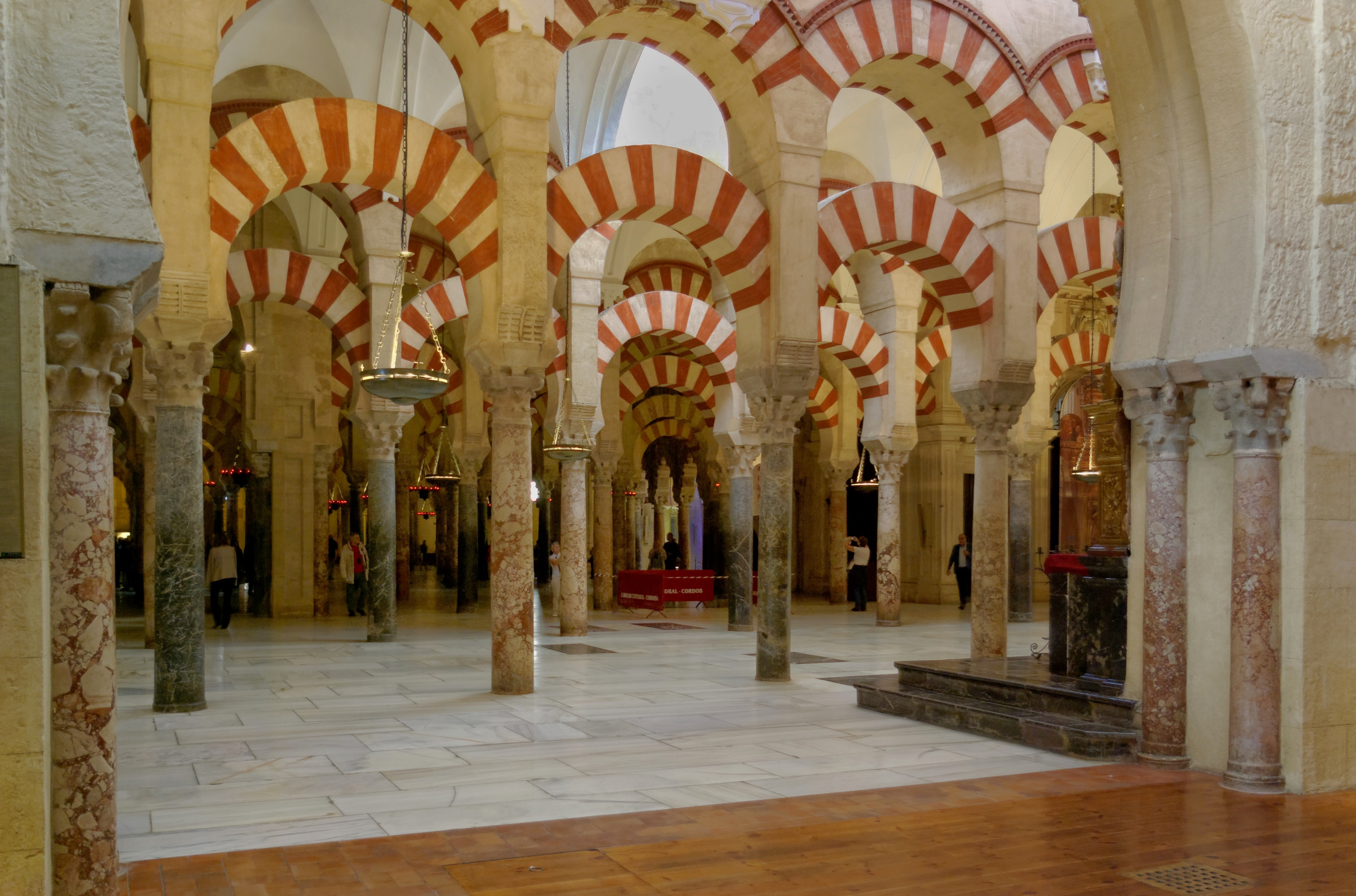
Horseshoe arches with equal-size voussoirs and keystones, Mosque–Cathedral of Córdoba, Spain

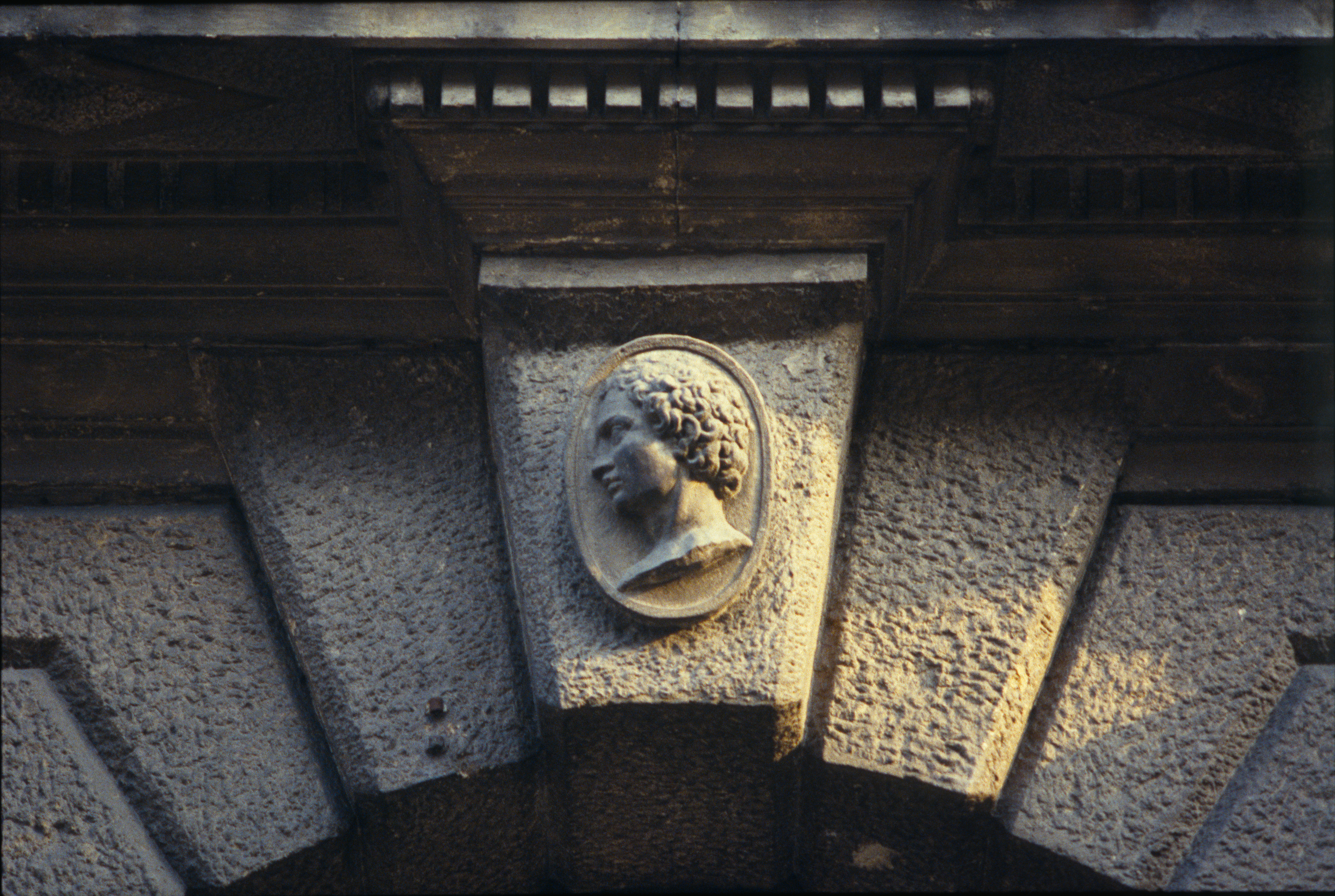
Main entrance Giusti's Palace Keystone, with rustic quoins and face of man

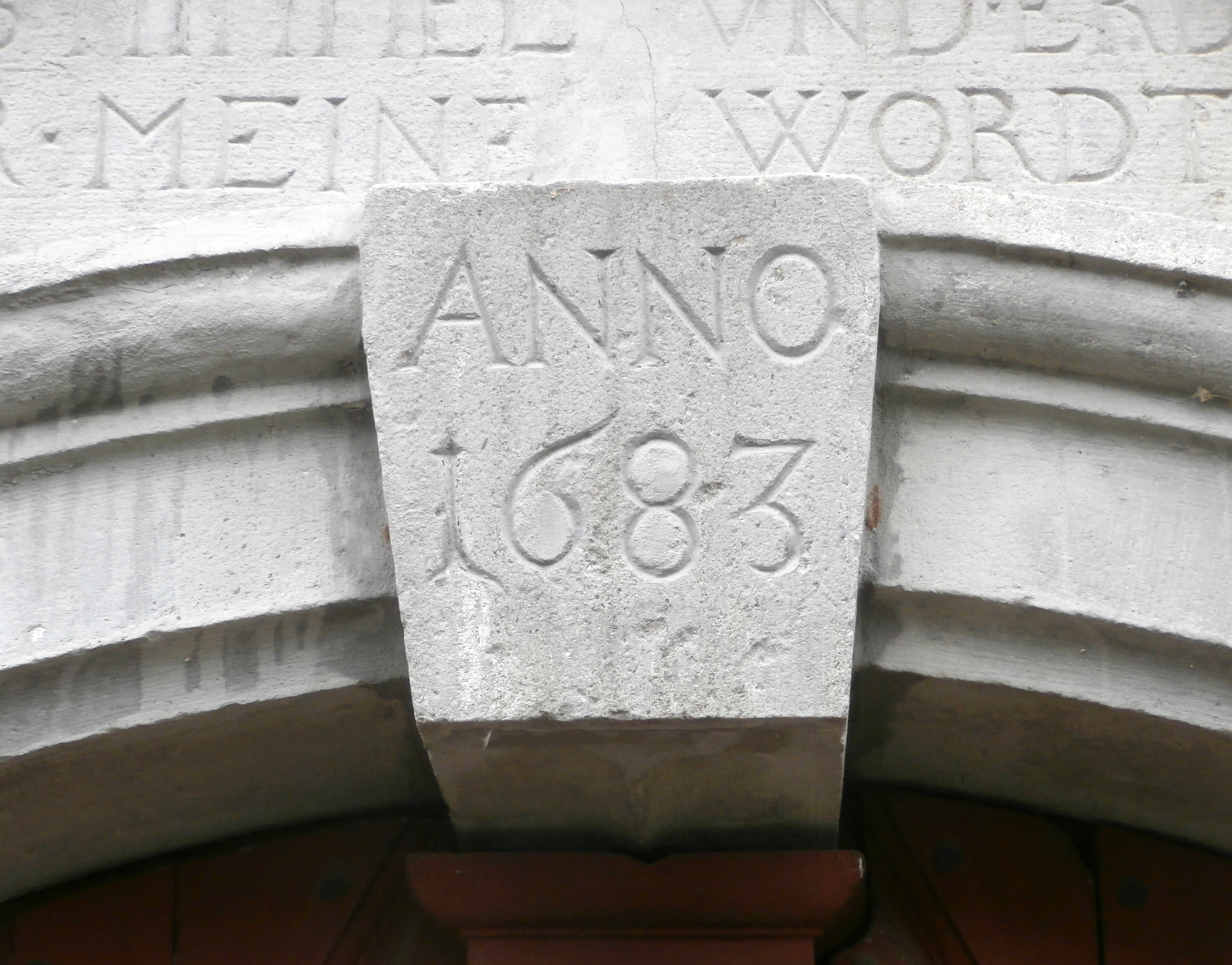
Dropped keystone on a German church

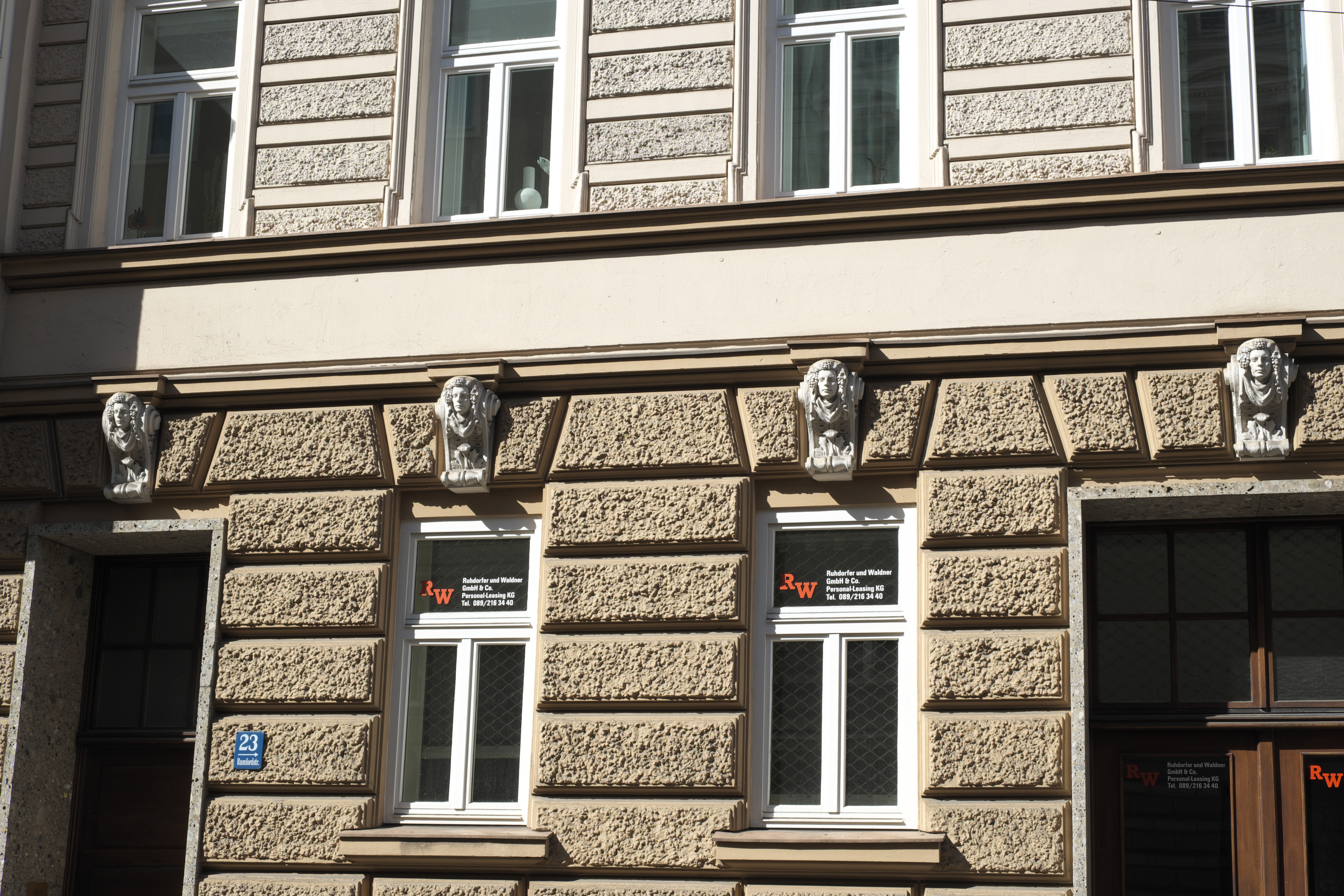
Doors and windows with decorated keystones, Munich

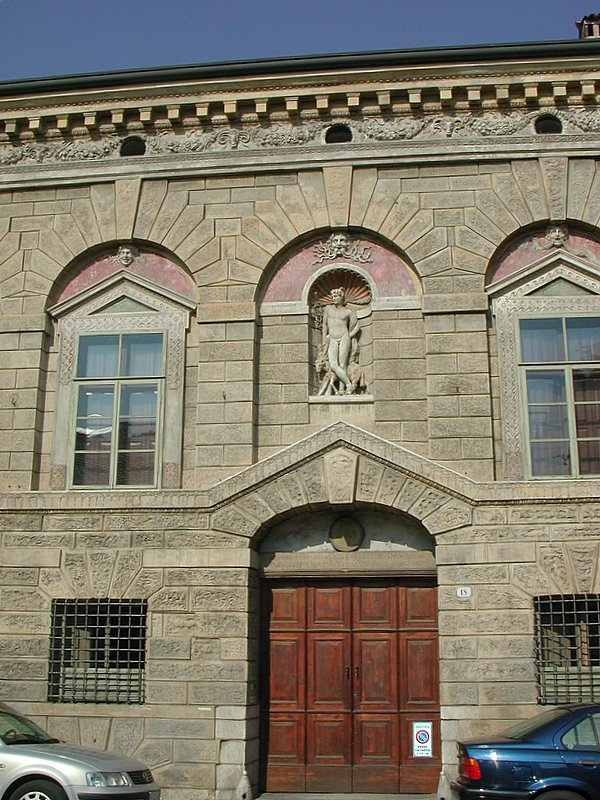
A range of plain but enlarged keystones by Giulio Romano for his house in Mantua

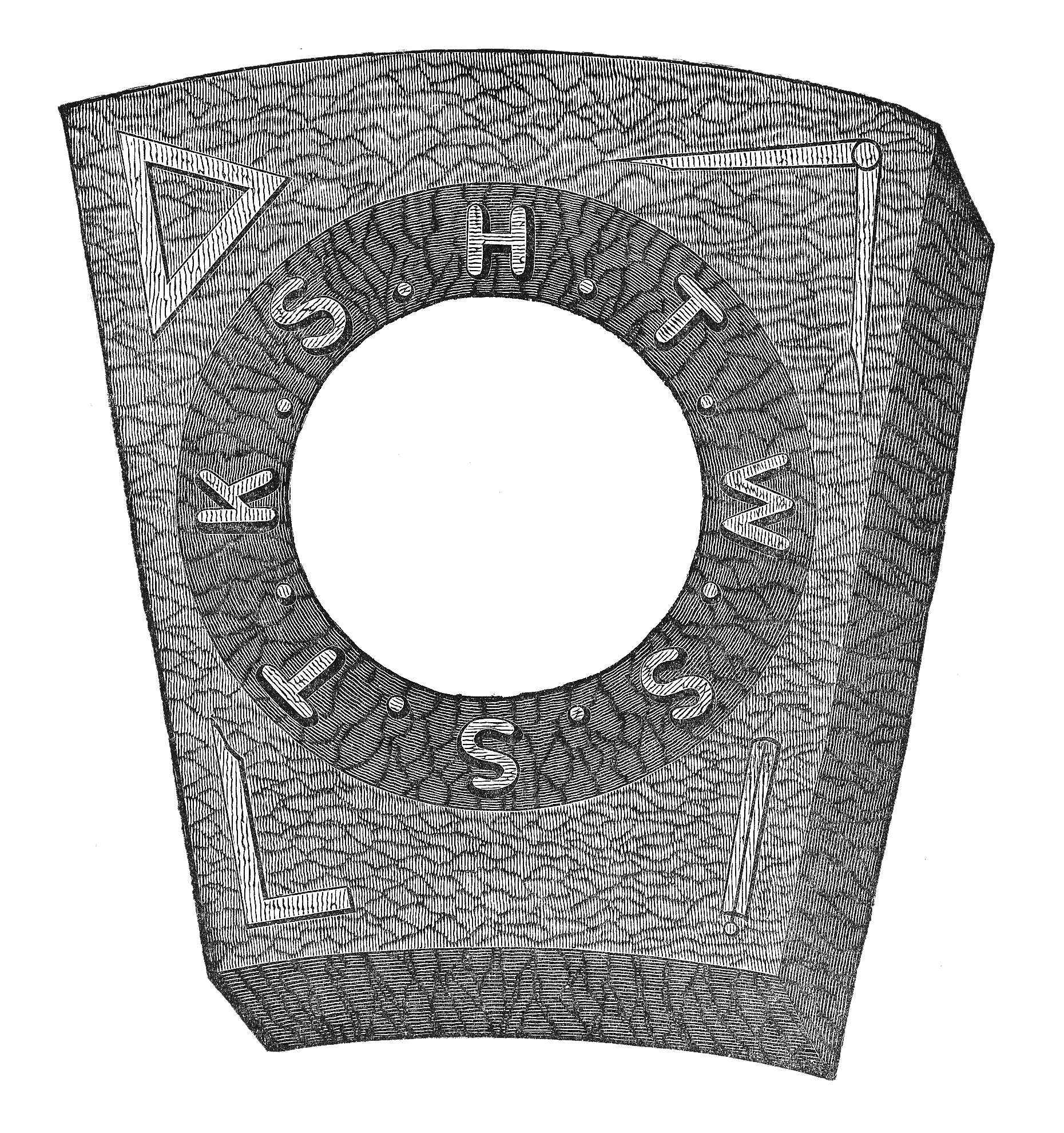
The keystone is the symbol of the Order of Mark Master Masons

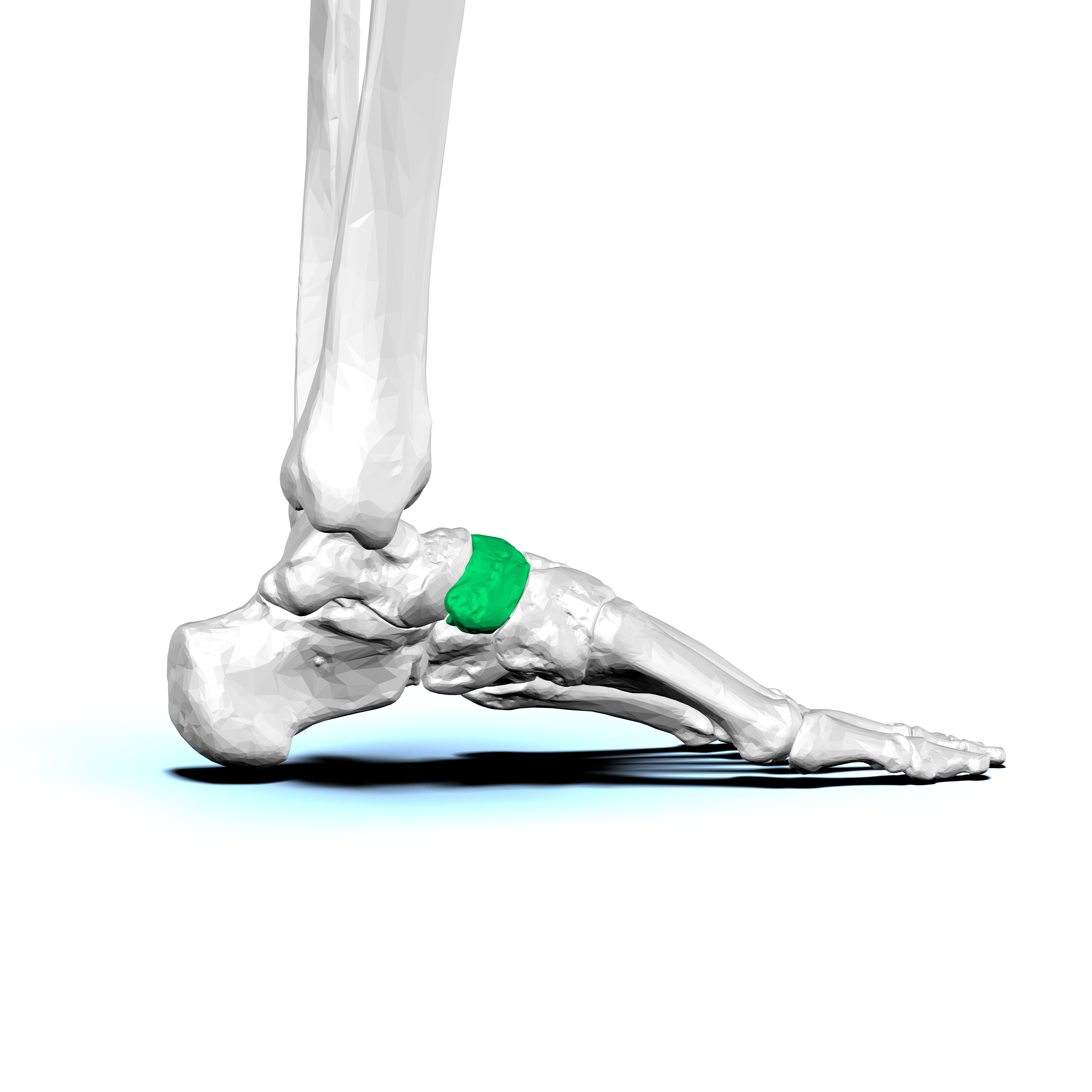
As a metaphor, the navicular bone, shown in green, is known as the keystone of the foot

== See also ==
- Architectural sculpture
- Coping (architecture)
- List of classical architecture terms
- Oculus compression ring

== Sources ==
- Brush, Mary Buchanan (1991). The Role of Historical Elements in Postmodernism: An Attempt to Converse Through Keystones (MS thesis). University of Pennsylvania. Archived from the original on March 28, 2025.
- "Keystone with Letters HTWSSTKS (Masonic)". City of Grove Oklahoma. City of Grove Oklahoma.
- "KEYSTONE". Encyclopedia Masonica. Universal Freemasonry.
- Wilkins, H.S.C. (1879). A treatise on mountain roads, live loads, and bridges. E. & F.N. Spon.
