= Amighetti =

Amighetti is an Italian surname from Lombardy, especially Brescia and Bergamo, ultimately deriving from Latin amīcus 'friend'. Notable people with the surname include:

- Francisco Amighetti (1907–1998), Costa Rican painter
- Giovanni Amighetti (born 1971), Italian musician and composer

== See also ==
- Amigoni
