= Speedwell Castle =

Coordinates: 52°40′37″N 2°10′27″W

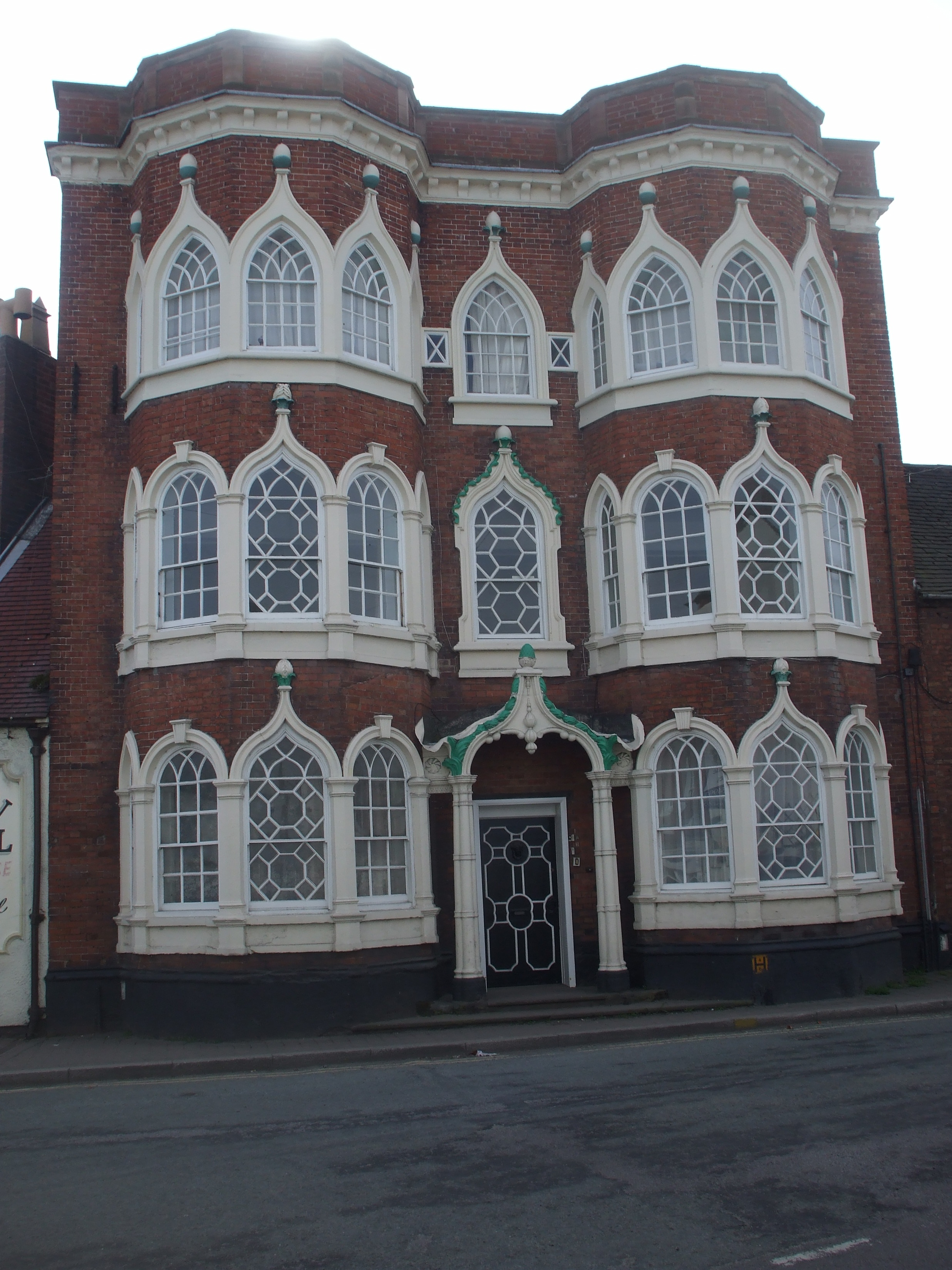
Speedwell Castle, Brewood, Staffordshire

Speedwell Castle is a mid-18th-century house at the centre of Brewood, in Staffordshire, England. Nikolaus Pevsner described it as a "peach" and a "delectable folly", and it stands beside the village market place, at the head of a T-junction on Bargate Street, facing onto Stafford Street.

The house is an interesting combination of "Gothick" and Classical architecture: the symmetrical brick façade has two canted bays, each of three storeys, either side of a pillared entrance with ogee portico and octagonal-panelled door. There are five windows around each bay on each floor, and a single window on the two floors above the entrance, with decorative plasterwork arranged in tiers of round-headed arches with keystones and ogee arches rising to pinnacles surmounted by acorns. The glazing is arranged in a delicate tracery, originally of hexagons (although the glazing bars are not original on the ground and first floors). The façade is finished by a modillion cornice and parapet, concealing a hipped slate roof with brick chimney stacks. The interior includes one surviving decorative plaster ceiling and a Chinese Chippendale staircase with fretted balustrade. The house became a grade II listed building in 1953.

The designer is unknown but some sources suggest Thomas Farnolls Pritchard, who worked nearby in Shropshire. The house has some similarities with Sandhurst House in Stourbridge, and Shenstone Hall near Lichfield. The design may have been inspired by the books published in the 1740s by Batty Langley, who attempted to improve Gothic forms by giving them classical proportions.

Speedwell Castle was reputedly built by a local apothecary William Rock, using the winnings from betting on the Duke of Bolton's racehorse, Speedwell. (An alternate story is that the builder owned an unsuccessful racehorse, and said that he would build a castle to celebrate if it ever won). After a period as the home of the classics master at Brewood Grammar School in the second half of the 19th century, it became a reading room in the late 19th century. It was then used as shops and storage until the 1930s, when it was converted to residential flats. And is now (2025) very run down.
