= Grub Street Journal =

Magazine

The Grub-Street Journal, published from 8 January 1730 to 1738, was a London weekly satirizing popular journalism and hack-writing in Grub Street. Largely edited by the nonjuror Richard Russel and the botanist John Martyn, it counted Alexander Pope among its contributors (though he disclaimed involvement), continuing the satirical project begun with The Dunciad; contemporary observers described the paper as inspired—and probably funded—by Pope in its first year. One of its targets was The Weekly Register, answered in a series of letters by the architect Batty Langley under the pseudonym “Hiram,” which defended Gothic architecture and praised Nicholas Hawksmoor.

After its end, The Literary Courier of Gruber Street succeeded it for a few months.

== Debate with The Weekly Register (1734–1735) ==
From mid-1734 into early 1735 the Journal ran near-weekly replies to James Ralph's architectural and art criticism in The Weekly Register, publishing Langley's masonic “Hiram” letters as a counter-series. These columns defended Gothic forms and Hawksmoor's churches—hailing St Anne's, Limehouse as “a most surprising beautiful structure”—and lampooned the Register’s phrasing (its call for an “octangular square” became a running joke).

Editorially, the Journal framed the quarrel as liberty versus authority, arguing that “taste” was a matter of preference and that London's heterogeneous streetscape reflected English gentlemen's freedom to spend as they pleased; to extend the debate it also reprinted Captain Valentine Knight’s 1666 rebuilding proposal on 8 May 1735.

The paper’s personae and satire echoed Pope’s orbit. Contributors riffed on a couplet from the 1729 Dunciad Variorum (“Silence, ye wolves! while Ralph to Cynthia howls, / And makes Night hideous—answer him, ye owls.”) and adopted taunting masks such as “Timon the Owl-Hater”; the editorial persona “Bavius” told a Register critic (James Ralph, a notorious Freethinker) to “read the Bible” after misidentifying scriptural scenes in Jacopo Amigoni’s murals.

== Bibliography ==
- Goldgar, Bertrand A., ed. (2002). The Grub-Street Journal, 1730-33. London: Pickering & Chatto. ISBN 1851967443. Facsimile reprint in 4 volumes.
- Hillhouse, James T. (1967) [First published 1928]. The Grub-Street Journal (Reissued. Illustrated ed.). New York: Benjamin Blom – via Internet Archive.
