= Jacopo Amigoni =

Italian painter (1682–1752)

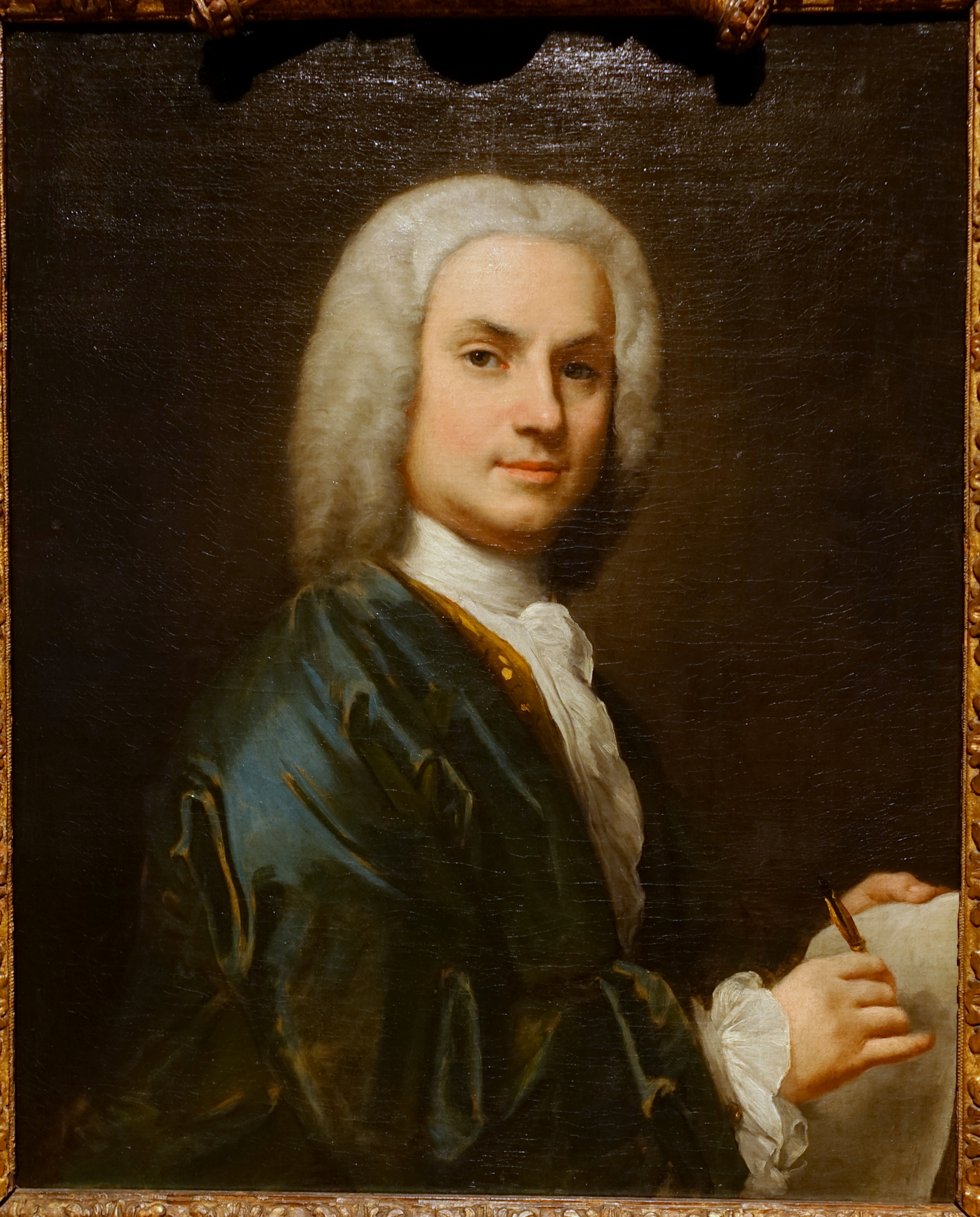
- Self-portrait, 1730–1735
- Born: Giacomo Amiconi; 1682; Naples, Kingdom of Naples
- Died: September 1752 (aged 69–70); Madrid, Spain
- Occupation: Painter
- Movement: Rococo
- Children: Caterina Amigoni Castellini

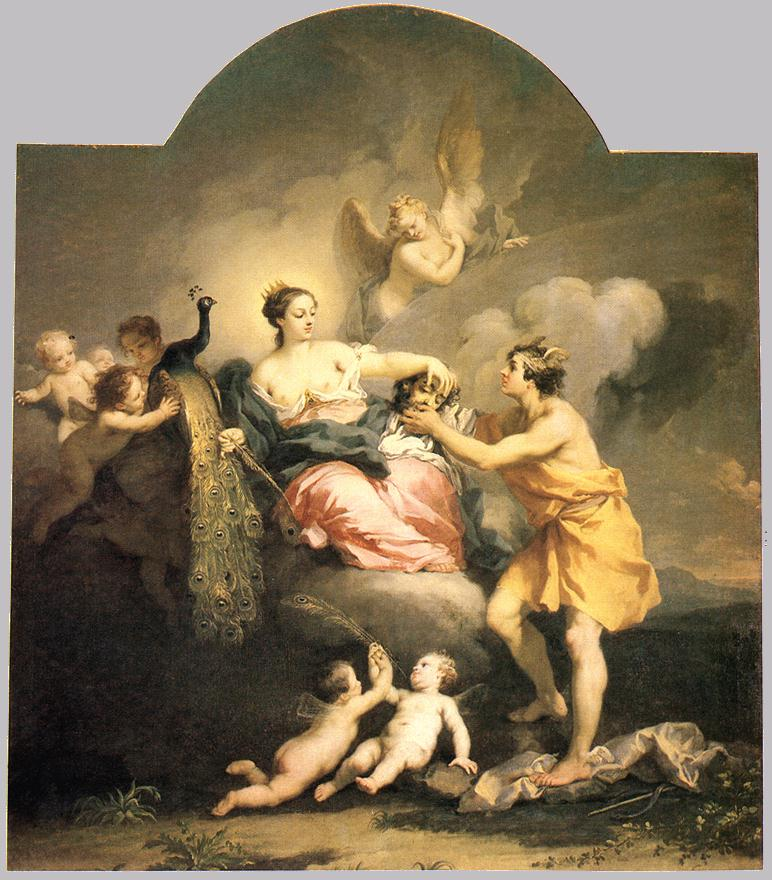
Juno Receiving the Head of Argos (1730–32) Oil on canvas, 108 × 72 cm. Moor Park, Rickmansworth, Hertfordshire.

Jacopo Amigoni (born Giacomo Amiconi; 1682 – September 1752), was an Italian painter of the late-Baroque or Rococo period, who began his career in Venice, but traveled and was prolific throughout Europe, where his sumptuous portraits were much in demand.

== Biography ==
He was born in Naples in 1682, despite superseded claims that he was born in Venice in 1675. Amigoni initially painted both mythological and religious scenes; but as the panoply of his patrons expanded northward, he began producing many parlour works depicting gods in sensuous languor or games. His style influenced Giuseppe Nogari. Among his pupils were Charles Joseph Flipart, Michelangelo Morlaiter, Pietro Antonio Novelli, Joseph Wagner, and Antonio Zucchi.

Starting in 1717, he is documented as working in Bavaria in the Castle of Nymphenburg (1719); in the castle of Schleissheim (1725–1729); and in the Benedictine abbey of Ottobeuren. He returned to Venice in 1726. His Arraignment of Paris hangs in the Villa Pisani at Stra. From 1730 to 1739, he worked in England, including at Moor Park, Wolterton Hall, and in London at Powis House and the Theatre Royal, Covent Garden. From there, he helped convince Canaletto to travel to England by telling him of the ample patronage available.

In London or during a trip to Paris in 1736, he met the celebrated castrato Farinelli, whose portrait he painted twice in 1735 and again in 1752. Amigoni also encountered the painting of François Lemoyne and François Boucher.

In London, he also became a flashpoint in the newspaper press. In 1734, James Ralph's The Weekly Register ran a five-week series on history painting that targeted Amigoni’s recent work—his frescoes for Lord Tankerville's house in St James’s Square (Palamedes detecting Ulysses's madness; The Prophecy of Tiresias; Ulysses with Deidamia), the ceiling at the Theatre Royal, Covent Garden (The Muses presenting Shakespeare to Apollo), and scenes at Powis House—faulting them for obscurity, over-ornament, and confused narratives. The Grub Street Journal replied point-by-point, at one stage pronouncing Amigoni’s genius superior to that of all English painters.

In 1739, he returned to Italy, perhaps to Naples and surely to Montecassino, in whose abbey existed two canvases (destroyed during World War II). He travelled to Venice to paint for Sigismund Streit, for the House of Savoy and for various buildings of the city.

In 1747, he left Italy for Madrid, encouraged by Farinelli, who held a court appointment there. He became court painter to Ferdinand VI of Spain and director of the Royal Academy of Saint Fernando. He painted a group portrait that included himself, Farinelli, Metastasio, Teresa Castellini, and an unidentified young man. The young man may have been the Austrian Archduke Joseph, the Habsburg heir to the throne. Amigoni died in Madrid.

Amigoni was the father of the pastellist Caterina Amigoni Castellini, and the brother of the artist Carlotta Amigoni.

== Partial anthology ==
- Consul Marcus Curius Dentatus prefers turnips to the Samnites' gifts
- Caroline Wilhelmina of Brandenburg-Ansbach
- Print after Amigoni of Princess Amelia Sophia Eleanora
- Prints after portraits by Amigoni.
- Venus disarming cupid.
- Venus and Adonis

== Gallery ==
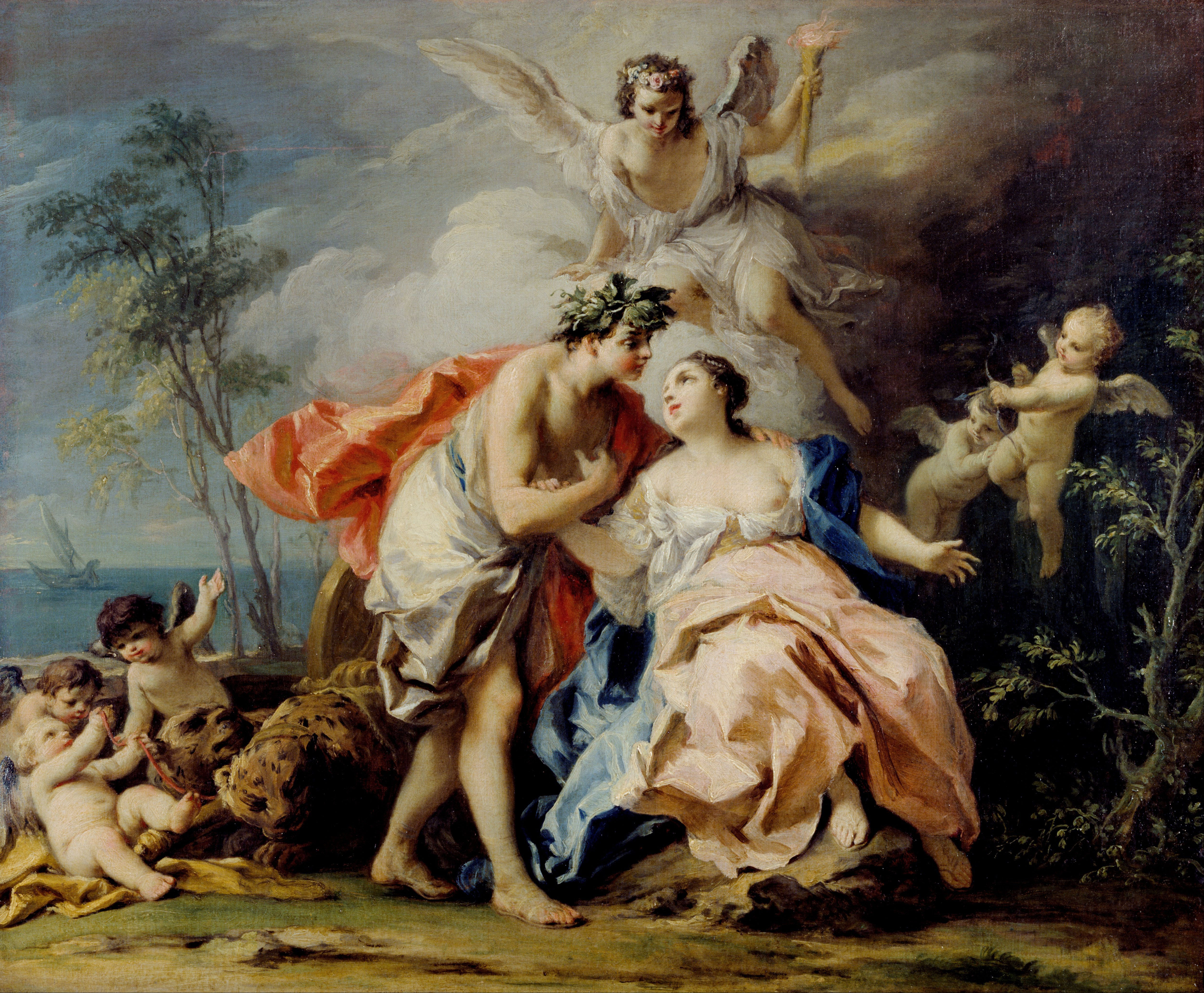
Bacchus and Ariadne, 1740

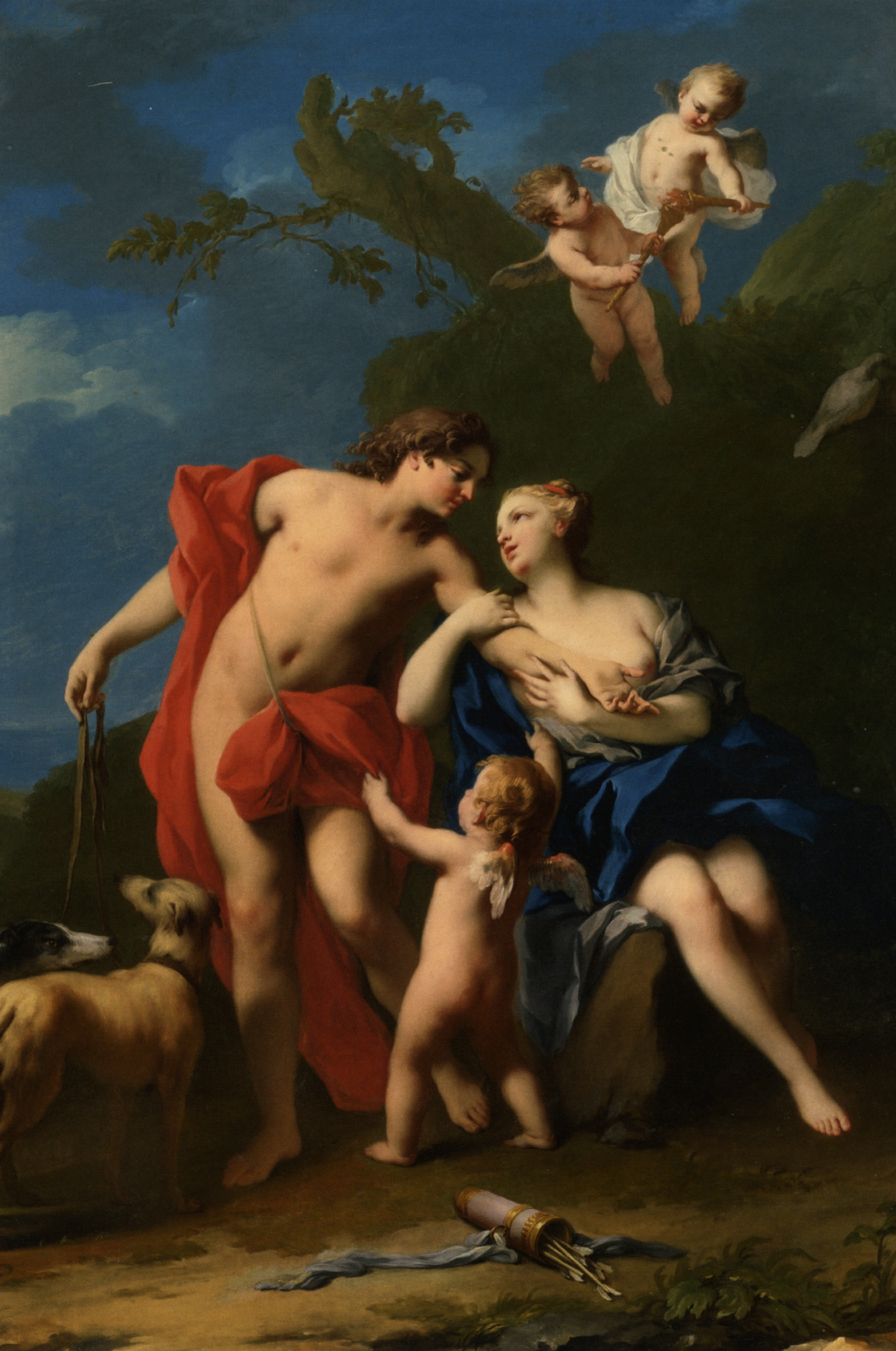
Venus and Adonis

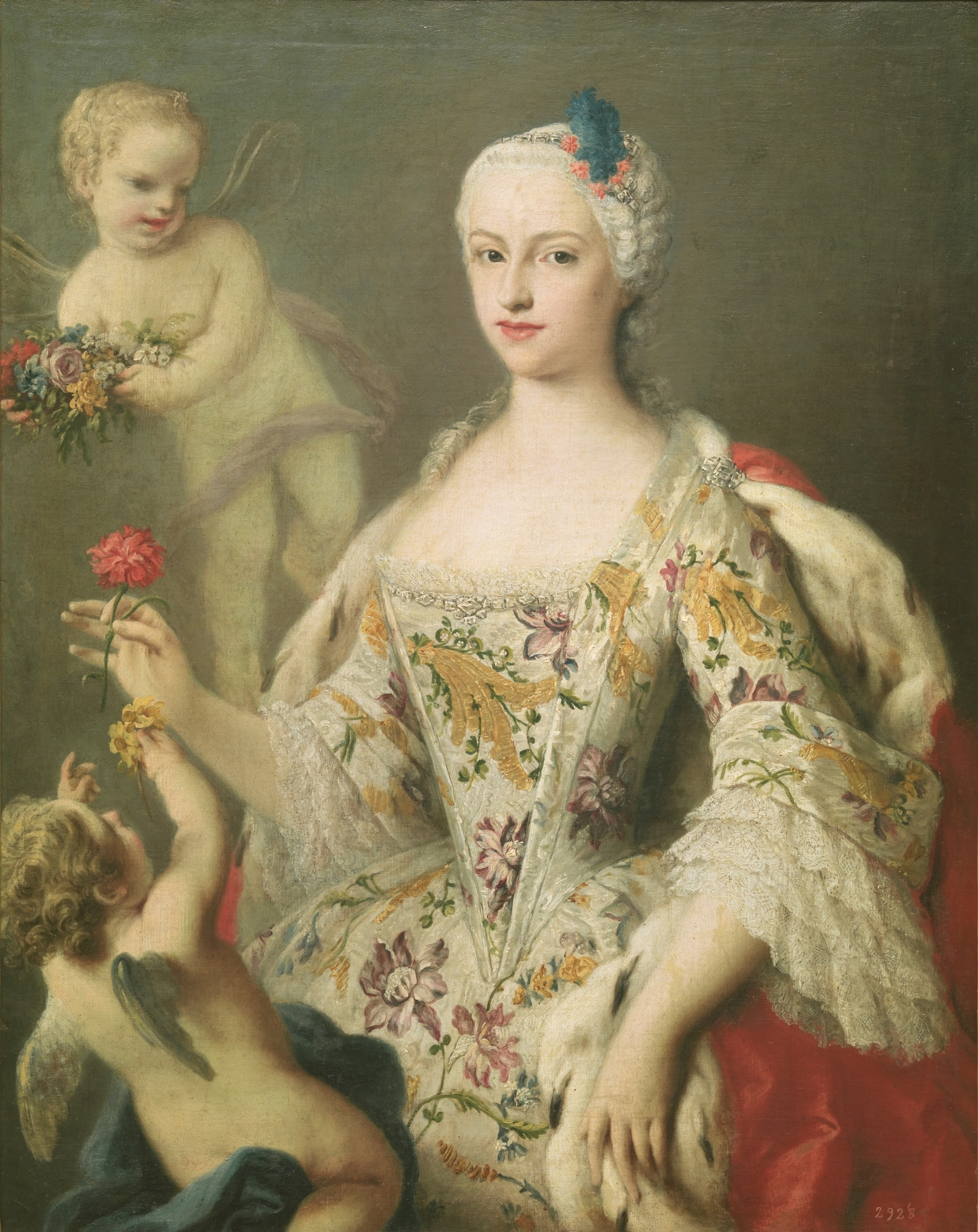
The Infanta María Antonia of Spain, Daughter of Philip V, 1750

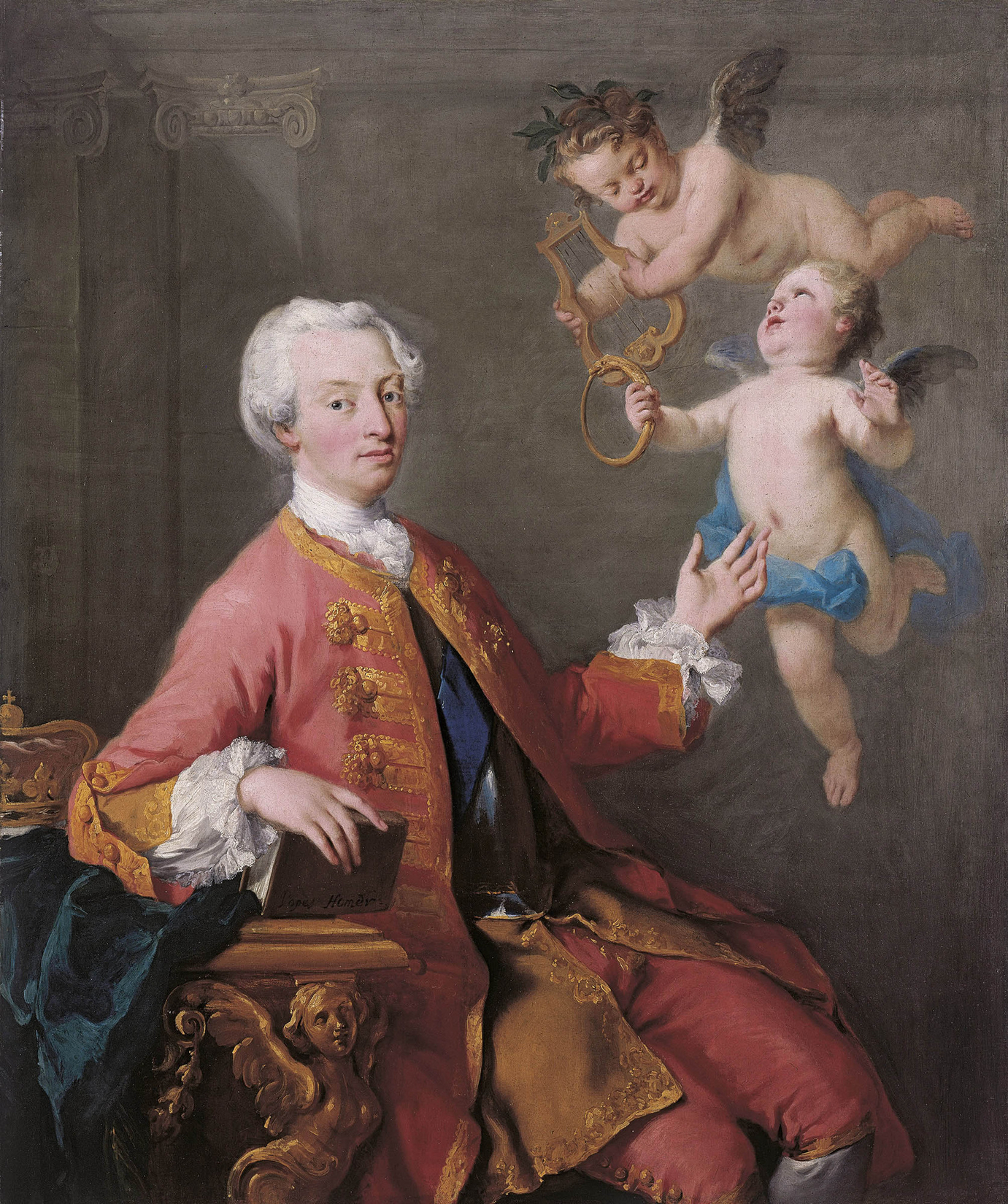
Frederick, Prince of Wales, 1735

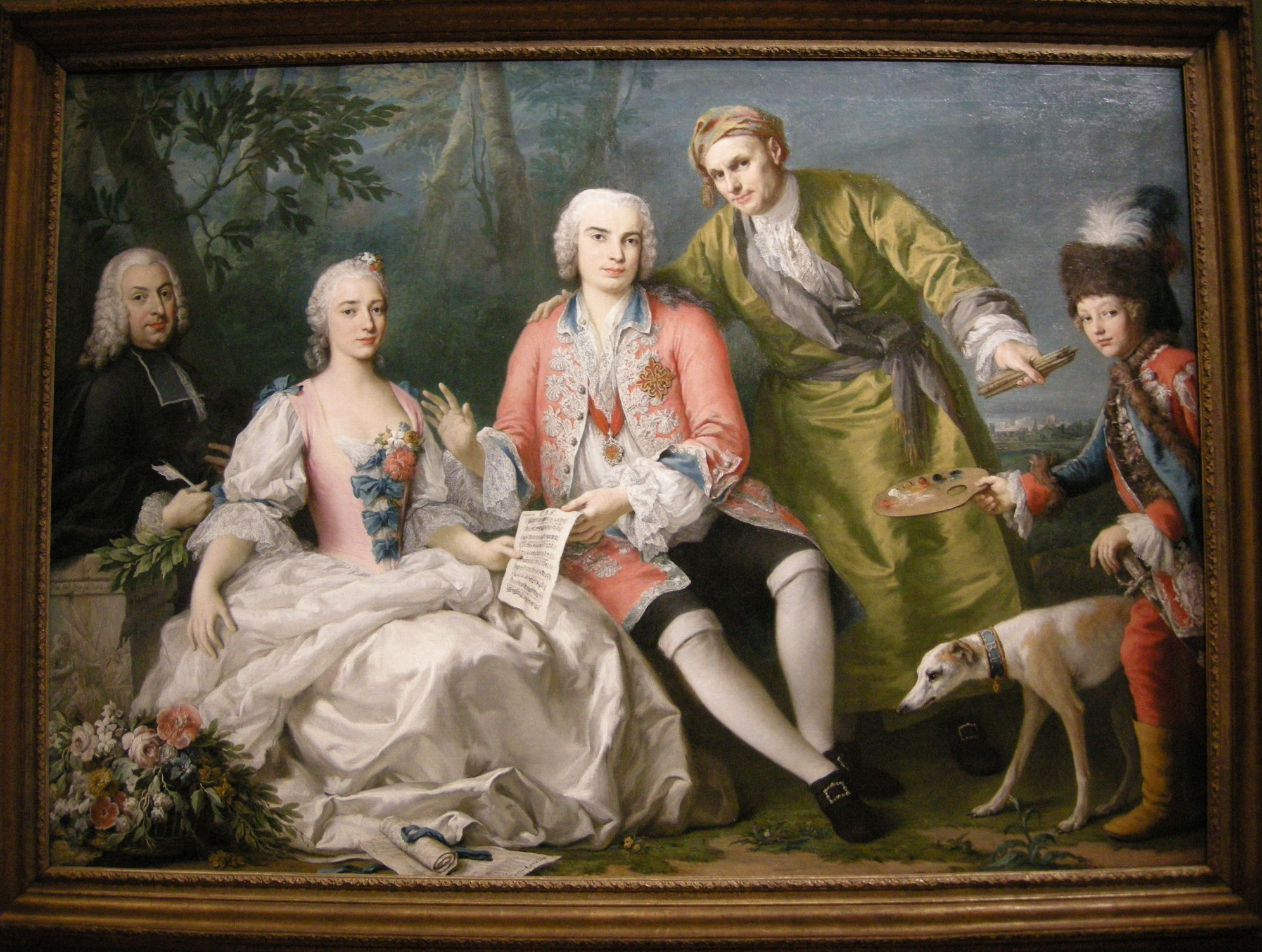
The singer Farinelli and friends, 1750 or 1752

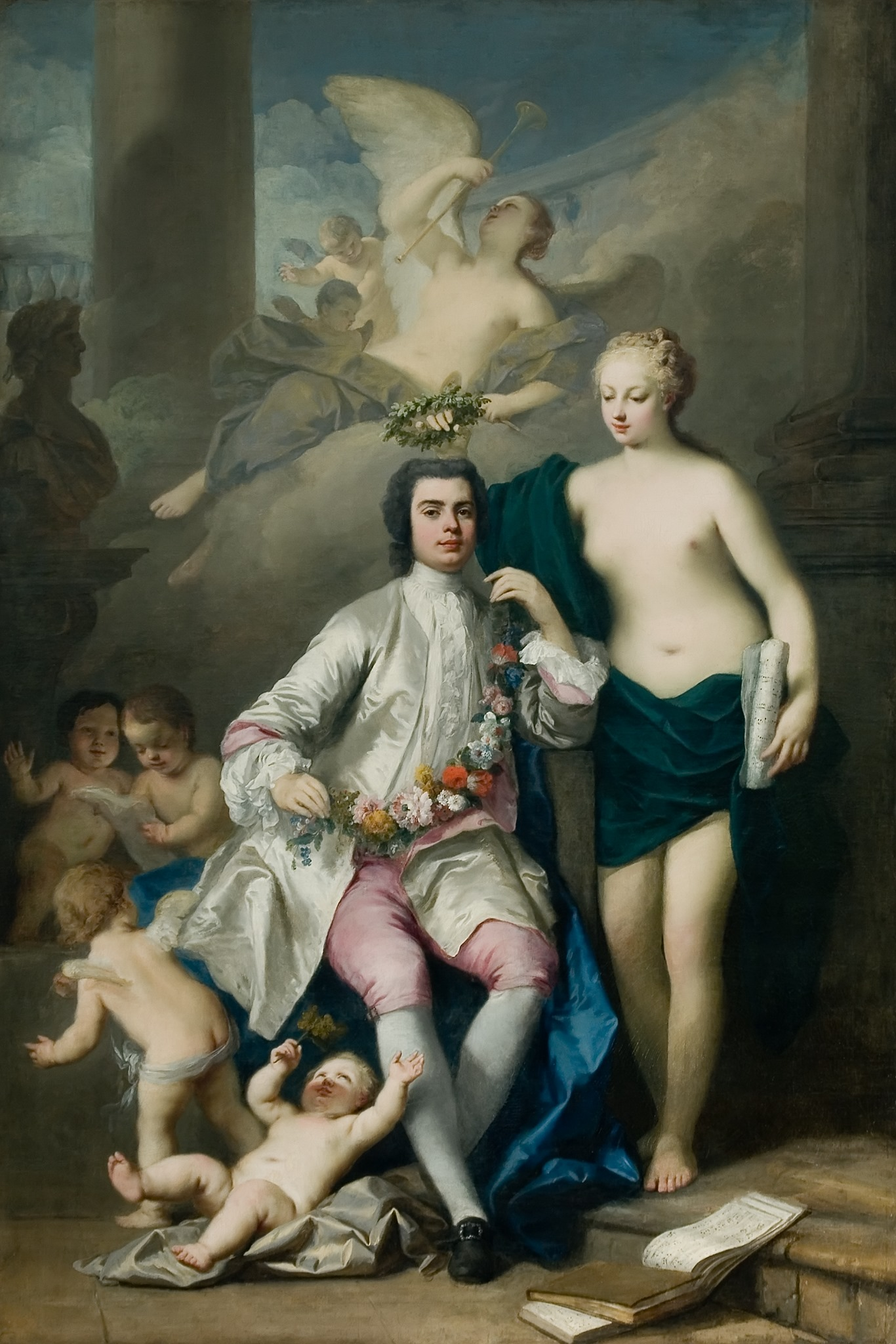
Portrait of the singer Carlo Broschi named Farinelli, 1734/1735
