= Batty Langley =

English landscape gardener and architect (1696–1751)

Batty Langley (baptised 14 September 1696 – 3 March 1751) was an English garden designer, architect, and prolific writer who produced a number of engraved designs for "Gothick" structures, summerhouses and garden seats in the years before the mid-18th century.

An eccentric landscape designer, he gave four of his sons the names Hiram, Euclid, Vitruvius and Archimedes. He published extensively, and attempted to "improve" Gothic forms by giving them classical proportions.

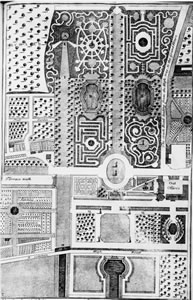
A garden plan by Langley for Orleans House in Twickenham, west London, mostly demolished in 1926.

== Early life ==
Langley was baptised in Twickenham, Middlesex, the son of a jobbing gardener Daniel Langley and his wife Elizabeth. He bore the name of David Batty, one of his father's patrons. He started worked as a gardener, inheriting some of his father's clients in Twickenham, then a village of suburban villas within easy reach of London by a pleasant water journey on the Thames. An early client was Thomas Vernon of Twickenham Park.

He married Anne Smith in February 1719. They had four children, but she died in June 1726. He had ten further children with his second wife, Catherine.

== Landscape gardening ==
Langley moved into surveying and landscape gardening. He published his first book, Practical Geometry, in 1726. Inspired by Switzer's Ichnographia Rustica of 1718, Langley advocated more irregular, informal gardens, with rococo "arti-natural" landscaping. His sinuous forms predated William Hogarth's line of beauty.

For the Palladian house built at Twickenham by James Johnston in 1710 (later Orleans House, demolished 1926), Langley, probably on his own endeavour, prepared and published a garden plan, which offered an encyclopaedia of the garden features that were swiftly becoming obsolete by the time the plan was published in Langley's A Sure Method of Improving Estates (1728): here are several mazes, a "wilderness" with many tortuous path-turnings, garden rooms or cabinets de verdure cut into dense woodland, formal stretches of garden canal and formally shaped basins of water, some with central fountains, and a central allée of trees leading to an exedra.

His New Principles of Gardening (1728) included designs for mazes, a feature he could never quite leave behind, with 28 plates engraved by his brother Thomas. He also published A Sure Method of Improving Estates (1728) and Pomona (1729).

He also undertook work at Castle Howard in North Yorkshire and Wrest Park in Bedfordshire.

== Architecture ==
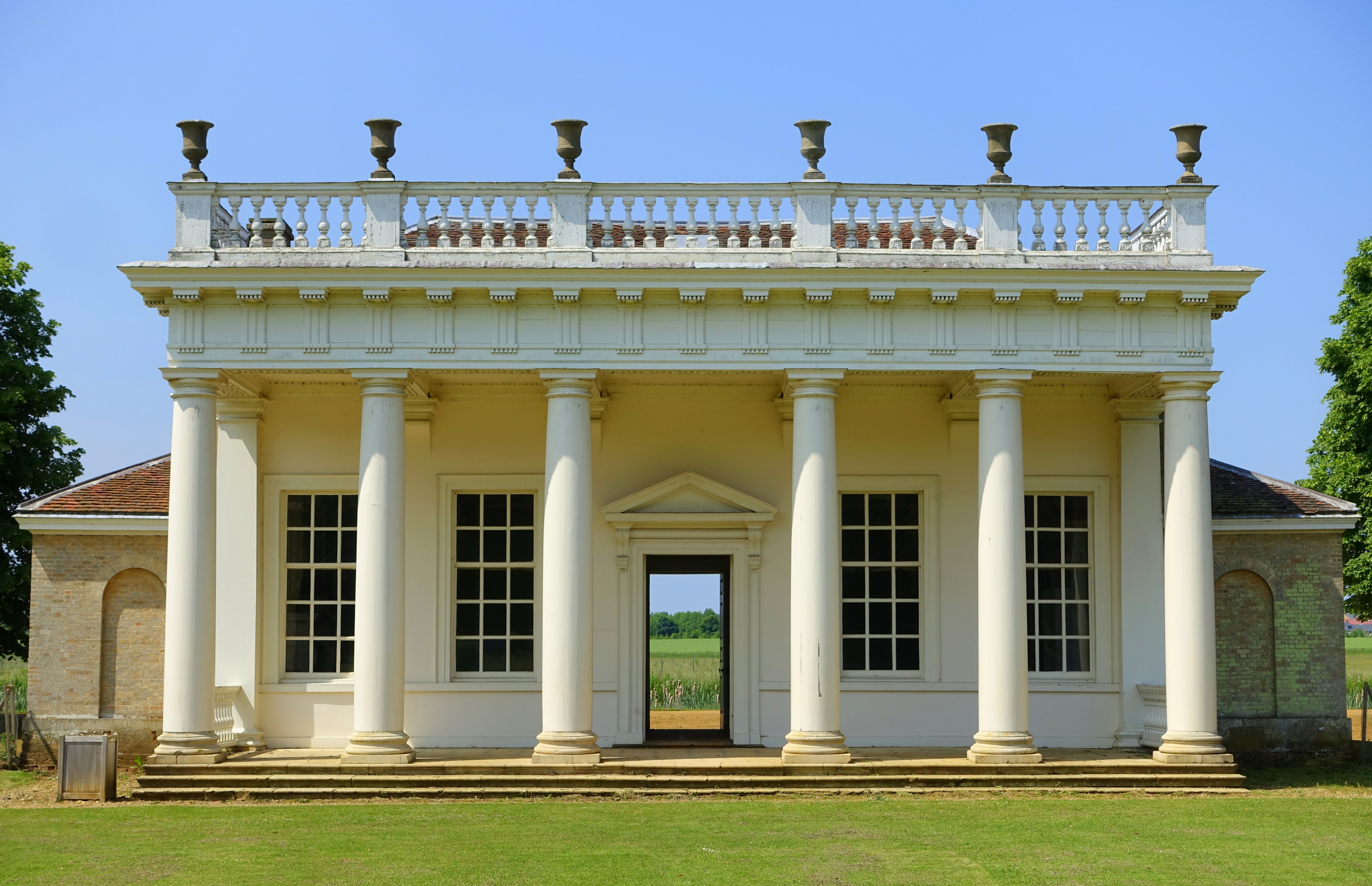
One of Langley's few commissions, the Grade II* listed Bowling Green House at Wrest Park, Bedfordshire

Langley moved from Twickenham to London in 1729, and shifted again from landscape gardening to architecture. Working near Exeter Change in the Strand, he published A Sure Guide to Builders in 1729. He moved to Westminster in the 1730s, where he started to teach drawing, geometry, architecture, and garden design, and continued to teach when he moved to Soho in 1738. He also made and sold stone garden ornaments.

Despite his literary aspirations, and advertisements in architectural journals, he secured few commissions, submitting an unsolicited proposal for the competition to design a new Mansion House in 1735 and a design for a new Westminster Bridge in 1736–1737. From July 1734 to March 1735 he published a near-weekly architectural column in the Grub Street Journal under the pseudonym "Hiram", replying to James Ralph's campaign in The Weekly Register. In those pieces he argued for a home-grown English architectural form—praising Gothic architecture (which he styled "native Saxon") and defending the work of Nicholas Hawksmoor (hailing St Anne's Limehouse as "a most surprising beautiful structure")—while lampooning the Register's phrasing (its call for an "octangular square") and challenging the notion that Inigo Jones and Lord Burlington had set a binding canon for public architecture; the Journal also broadened the debate by reprinting Captain Valentine Knight’s 1666 rebuilding proposal on 8 May 1735. He published a wide range of architectural books, from a huge folio on Ancient Masonry in parts from 1733 to 1736 with over 450 plates, through The Builder's Complete Assistant of 1738 (also known as The Builder's Complete Chest-Book) and The Builder's Jewel of 1741, to the tiny The Workman's Golden Rule in 1750, in vicesimo-quarto.

He is best known for one of his confident self-promotions, Ancient Architecture, Restored, and Improved published in 1742 and reissued in 1747 as Gothic Architecture, improved by Rules and Proportions, a bit of cockscombry that thoroughly irritated Horace Walpole, whose Gothick villa at Twickenham, Strawberry Hill, gave impetus to the stirrings of the Gothic Revival:

All that his books achieved, has been to teach carpenters to massacre that venerable species, and to give occasion to those who know nothing of the matter, and who mistake his clumsy efforts for real imitations, to censure the productions of our ancestors, whose bold and beautiful fabrics Sir Christopher Wren viewed and reviewed with astonishment, and never mentioned without esteem. (Walpole, Anecdotes of Painting, 1798, p 484)

His book, with engravings by his brother Thomas, attempted to improve Gothic forms by giving them classical proportions and to create a scheme of architectural orders for Gothic architecture. He provided inspiration for elements of buildings from Great Fulford and Hartland Abbey in Devon, to Speedwell Castle in Brewood in Staffordshire, and Tissington Hall in Derbyshire, and the Gothic temple at Bramham Park in Yorkshire, and gates at Castletown House in County Kildare.

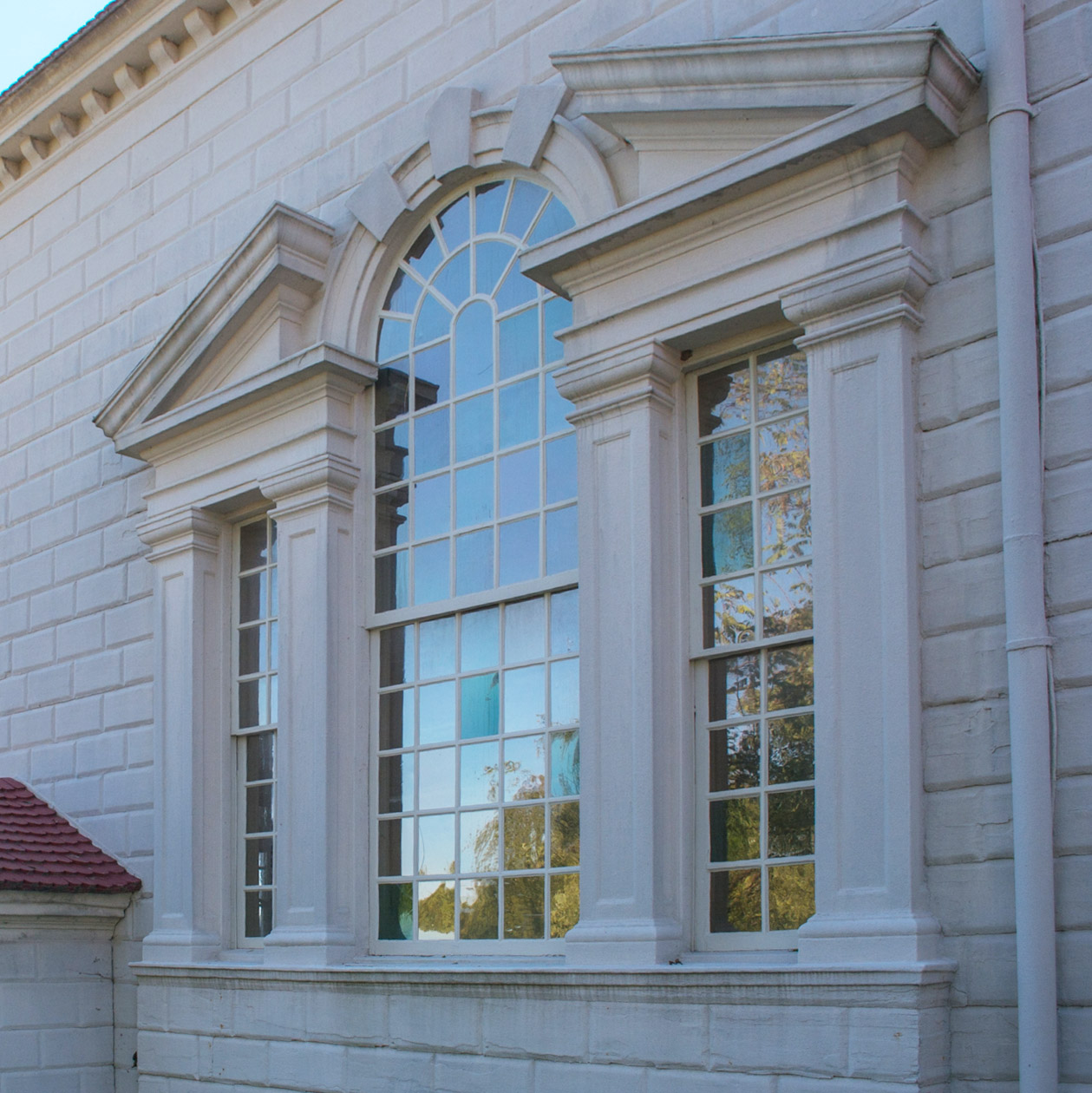
Venetian window at Mount Vernon

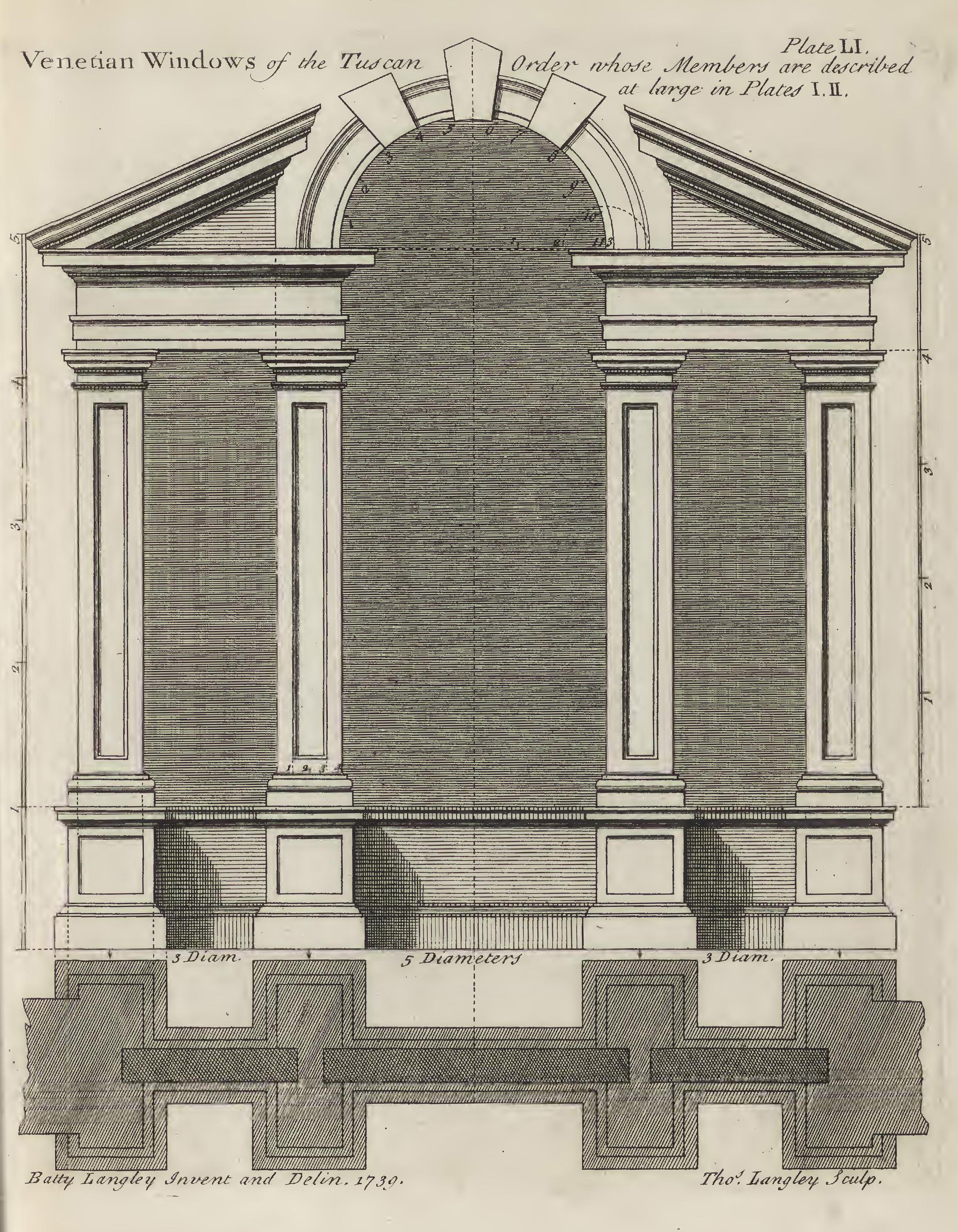
Plate 51 of The City and Country Builder's and Workman's Treasury of Designs

Langley's books were also enormously influential in Britain's American colonies. At Mount Vernon, for example, George Washington relied upon plate 51 of Langley's The City and Country Builder's and Workman's Treasury of Designs as the source for the famous Venetian (or Palladian) window in the dining room; upon plate 54 of the same book for the ocular window on Mount Vernon's western facade; and upon plate 75 of Langley's The Builder's Jewel for the rusticated wood siding.

Batty Langley was also thought to be an important Freemason; his naming of his son Hiram was a reference to the architect, prominent in Masonic tradition and symbolism, of Solomon's Temple, and many of his books were dedicated to his Masonic brethren. The frontispiece to The Builder's Jewel (1741), for example, contains many examples of Masonic symbolism found in the first three degrees of Freemasonry.

He was imprisoned for debt in Newgate Prison and wrote an account of that institution, An Accurate Description of Newgate. He died at home in Soho in 1751.
