= Powis House =

Coordinates: 51°31′19″N 0°7′11″W

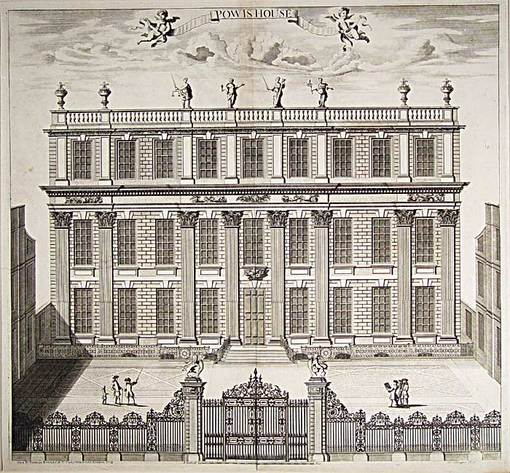
The second version of Powis House, c. 1714.

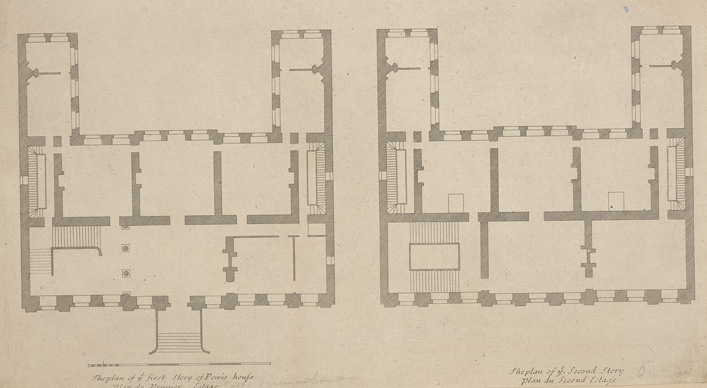
Ground and first floor plans

Powis House was an 18th-century mansion in London, England. It stood on the northern side of Great Ormond Street, not far from Queen Square.

The first version of Powis House was built in the 1690s for William Herbert, 2nd Marquess of Powis, member of the Herbert family. No drawings of this version survive. At some point it was let for use as the French embassy, and on 26 January 1713 it burned to the ground, while the Ambassador, the Duc d'Aumont, was entertaining. Jonathan Swift attributed this event to "the carelessness of the rascally French servants". A replacement house was soon built. It had three main storeys above an arched basement and was 104 feet (32 metres) wide. The subtle but lively façade featured Corinthian pilasters and a phoenix above the front door. The architect is unknown, but may have been French. The staircase walls were painted by the Venetian painter of the rococo, Giacomo Amiconi.

Philip Yorke, 1st Earl of Hardwicke leased the house in the mid 18th century and from 1764 to 1783 it was the Spanish embassy. However, the locality was rapidly falling from favour with the aristocracy, making the demise of the house more or less inevitable, and by the end of the 18th century it had been demolished. There is now a small access street to Great Ormond Street Hospital called Powis Place.

== See also ==
- Newcastle House - another London mansion, which was also briefly known as Powis House before assuming its final name.
