= Caterina Amigoni Castellini =

Italian artist

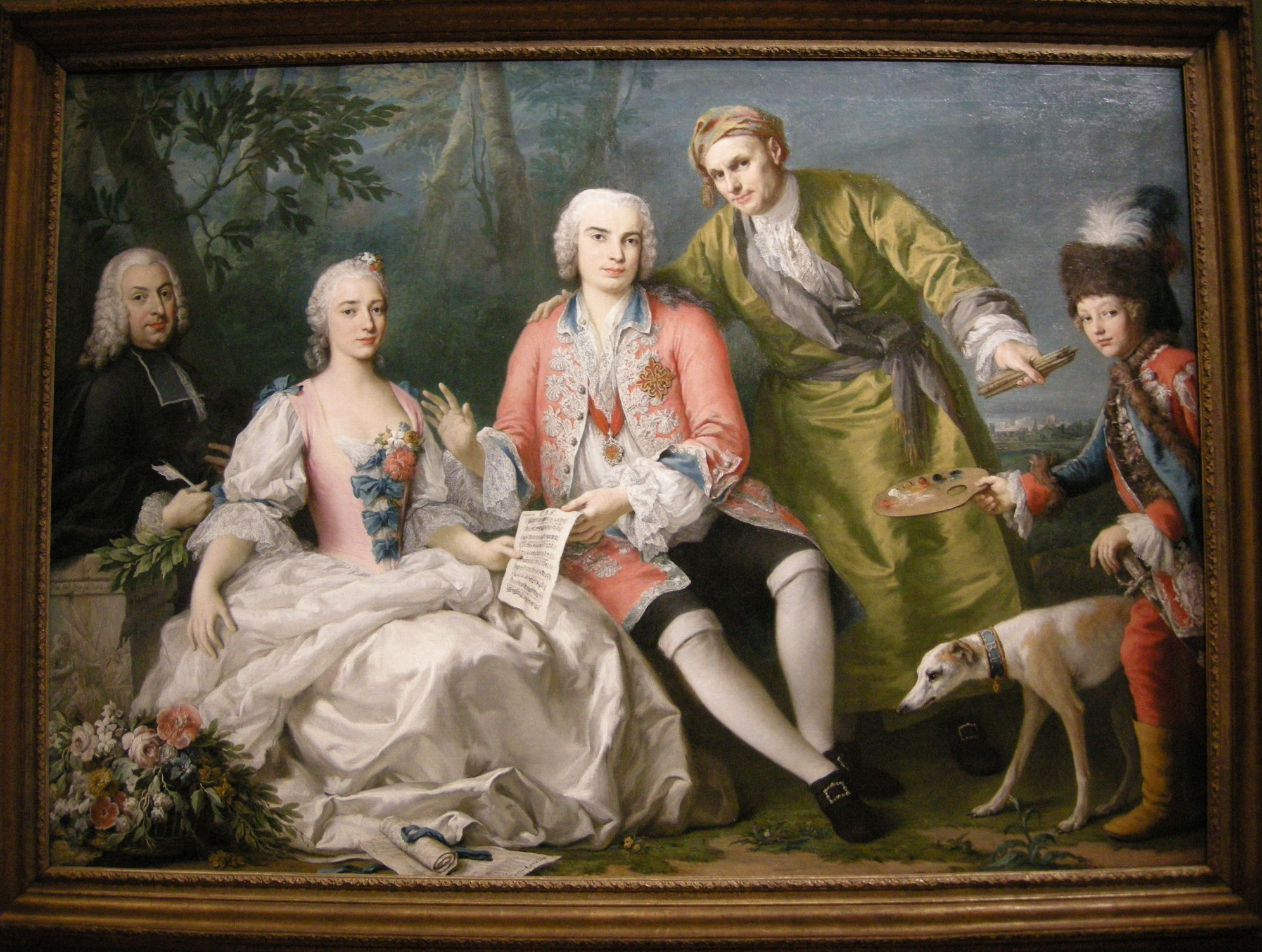
Farinelli and his friends, 1750–1752, oil on canvas, by Caterina's father Jacopo Amigoni. Teresa Castellini is seated second from the left, holding the score "Vi conosco amate stelle" from Metastasio's opera Zenobia jointly with Farinelli. Depicted from left to right: Metastasio, Teresa Castellini, Farinelli, the painter Amigoni, Farinelli's dog and a boy dressed as a little hussar. National Gallery of Victoria, Melbourne, Felton Bequest, 1950, oil on canvas, 173 × 245cm.

Caterina Amigoni Castellini (fl. 1747 – 1773) was an Italian pastellist living in the Spanish Empire.

Castellini was the daughter of Venetian painter Jacopo Amigoni; after his 1738 marriage to mezzo-soprano Maria Antonia Marchesini, he was appointed court painter in Madrid, moving there in 1747. In 1773, Richard Twiss, on a visit to the city, encountered the painter's two daughters, Signora Castellini and Signora Belluomini. Twiss claimed that both women were talented in both vocal and instrumental music, and said of Castellini that she "paints portraits in Crayons extremely well". The reference was picked up by Thomas Dodd, who erroneously dubbed the artist "Charlotte", the name of her aunt Carlotta Amigoni, also an artist. Caterina may have been related by marriage to Teresa Castellini, subject of the well-known group portrait by her father shown here, but this is not certain.
