= Elizabeth McKellar =

British architectural historian (born 1962)

- Born: 14 July 1962 (age 64); London, UK
- Education: St Hugh's College, Oxford; University College London; Royal College of Art
- Occupations: Architectural historian, academic
- Awards: Elisabeth Blair MacDougall Award (2017)

Elizabeth McKellar FRHistS (born 14 July 1962) is a British architectural and design historian and academic. She is professor emerita in Architectural and Design History at The Open University and served as President of the Society of Architectural Historians of Great Britain from 2021 to 2026.

== Early life and education ==
McKellar studied modern history at St Hugh's College, Oxford, graduating in 1984. She received an MSc in the History of Modern Architecture from the Bartlett School of Architecture and Planning at University College London in 1985.

She completed a PhD in the History of Design through the joint Royal College of Art and Victoria and Albert Museum programme in 1992. Her thesis was titled Architectural Practice for Speculative Building in Late Seventeenth-Century London.

== Career ==
McKellar worked as a historical adviser and researcher for the Hackney Society from 1985 to 1990. She subsequently taught at Kingston Polytechnic and Canterbury College of Art and was a lecturer and senior lecturer at the University of North London from 1988 to 1993. From 1993 to 1996, she was Head of Higher Education at the Victoria and Albert Museum.

In 1996, McKellar joined Birkbeck College, University of London, as a senior lecturer in the history of art and architecture. She remained at Birkbeck until 2005, when she joined The Open University as a senior lecturer and staff tutor.

McKellar became Professor and chair in Architectural and Design History at The Open University in 2013, serving until 2020. She has since been professor emerita in Architectural and Design History.

She has been a member of the Editorial Boards of The London Journal, the Georgian Group Journal, The London Record Society and Lund Humphries publishers. She has been an adviser to the Royal Commission on the Historic Monuments of England, English Heritage, the Museums, Libraries and Archives Council and was a member of Historic England's London Advisory Committee (2012–2018).

== Research ==
McKellar's research focuses on the architectural and urban history of London, particularly its development from the seventeenth to nineteenth centuries, urbanism, housing and vernacular architecture. She has also written widely on Georgian and Neo-Georgian British architecture from the seventeenth to the mid-twentieth century the and the history of architectural historiography.

== Publications ==
McKellar has published many journal articles and chapters in edited volumes as well as the following books.

- ''The German Hospital: A Social and Architectural History'' (1990)
- ''The Birth of Modern London: The Development and Design of the city, 1660–1720'' (1999)
- ''Articulating British Classicism: New Approaches in Eighteenth-Century Architecture'', co-edited with Barbara Arciszewska (2004)
- ''Landscapes of London: The city, the Country, and the Suburbs 1660–1840'' (2013)
- ''Neo-Georgian Architecture 1880–1970: A Reappraisal'', co-edited with Julian Holder (2016)

== Awards and recognition ==
McKellar is a Fellow of the Royal Historical Society (FRHistS). In 2017, she received the Elisabeth Blair MacDougall Award from the Society of Architectural Historians (United States) for ''Landscapes of London''.
