= Valentine Knight =

English architect

- Military career
- Allegiance: Great Britain
- Rank: Captain

Valentine Knight (fl. 1666) was a 17th-century English architect. After the Great Fire, he submitted plans for rebuilding the city of London to King Charles II, although they were never adopted. Knight's plans called for a layout which emphasized reorganization of building plots above reorganization of the street layouts advocated by Christopher Wren and John Evelyn.

Knight's plan called for the construction of a toll canal which would fund the further reconstruction of London. Charles was incensed that Knight suggested the King "draw a benefit to himself from so public a calamity of his people" – and had Knight briefly thrown in jail.

Before the Fire, Knight was nominated to be a Knight of the Royal Oak.
