= Ralph Griffiths =

English journal editor and publisher

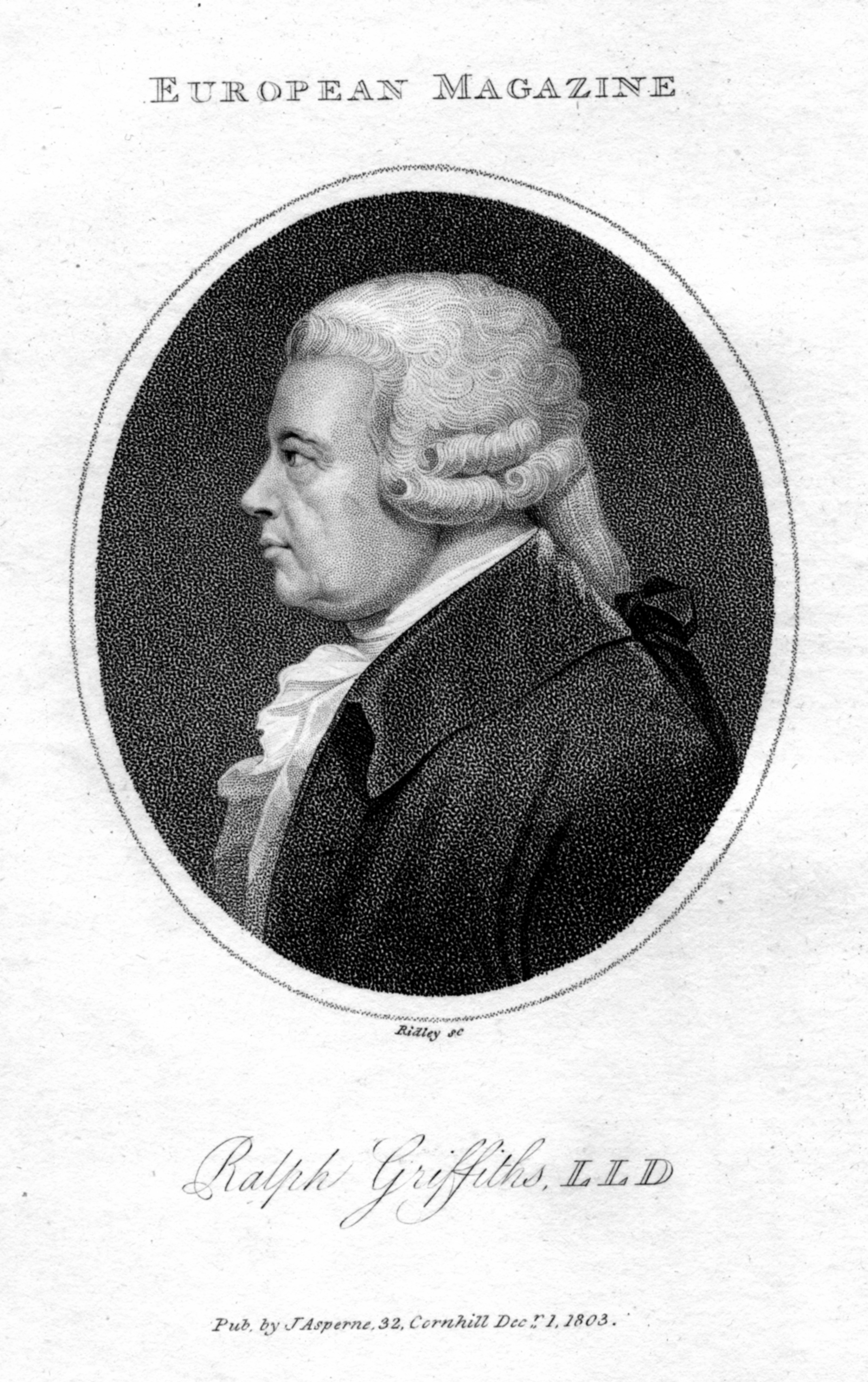
Ralph Griffiths: essayist, publisher, watchmaker, husband, and wit.

Ralph Griffiths (c.1720 – 28 September 1803) was an English journal editor and publisher of Welsh extraction. In 1749, he founded London's first successful literary magazine, the Monthly Review (1749–1845), and remained its editor until his death in 1803.

== Biography ==
Griffiths was born in Shropshire, England, but little is known of his early life; he began his career as a watchmaker at Stone, Staffordshire, before moving to London around 1741 to work for the Fleet Street bookseller Jacob Robinson. In 1747 Griffiths erected the warning Sign of the Dunciad outside of his own shop. Two years later he launched the Monthly Review, which became an instant success and earned him an estimated £2,000 a year. The bookseller's sign warning dunces that The Monthly would have no mercy in exposing dull and uninteresting authors.

Throughout his life, Griffiths was an avid collector of books, pamphlets and essays. He was an early campaigner for improving the literary status of female poets and novelists, and in a 1798 review of Elizabeth Moody's Poetic Trifles wrote,

the Age of ingenious and learned Ladies; who have excelled so much in the more elegant branches of literature, that we need not to hesitate in concluding that the long agitated dispute between the two sexes is at length determined; and that it is no longer a question, whether woman is or is not inferior to man in natural ability, or less capable of excelling in mental accomplishments.- New Series xxvii. 441

In 1748, Griffiths published his most famous pamphlet, "The Expediency and Necessity of Revising and Improving the Public Liturgy. Humbly Represented". In 1750, together with his brother Fenton, he published John Cleland's scandalous Fanny Hill, or Memoirs of a Woman of Pleasure", which he had bought for £20, but which earned him a reputed £10,000.

In 1758, Griffiths printed James Ralph’s pamphlet The Case of Authors by Profession or Trade, Stated, an early defence of paid authorship. His periodical, The Monthly Review, praised it as a fair account of the difficulties facing professional authors.

More grounded than her husband, Griffiths' wife largely looked after his financial affairs and was a regular contributor to The Monthly. Mrs Griffiths has variously been described as "his literary wife", and "an antiquated female critic". However, Griffiths ran into financial difficulties, and c. 1761 he was forced to sell a one-quarter share of The Monthly due to competition from the rival periodical The Critical Review.

Griffiths' editorship of The Monthly brought him fame abroad, and on 1 May 1764, Benjamin Franklin wrote,

I will do everything in my power to recommend the work Mr. Griffiths mentions, having the same sentiments of it that you express. But I conceive many more of them come to America than he imagines. Our booksellers, perhaps, write for but few, but the reason is that a multitude of our people trade more or less to London; and all that are bookishly disposed receive the reviews singly from their correspondents as they come out.

By 1780, he had again recovered sole ownership of the publication, though he had by then largely "retired from his public situation as a bookseller". He died, in his eighties, at Linden House, Turnham Green (now Chiswick High Road), London.
