= Old England (periodical) =

London political periodical (1743–1753)

Old England: or the Constitutional Journal
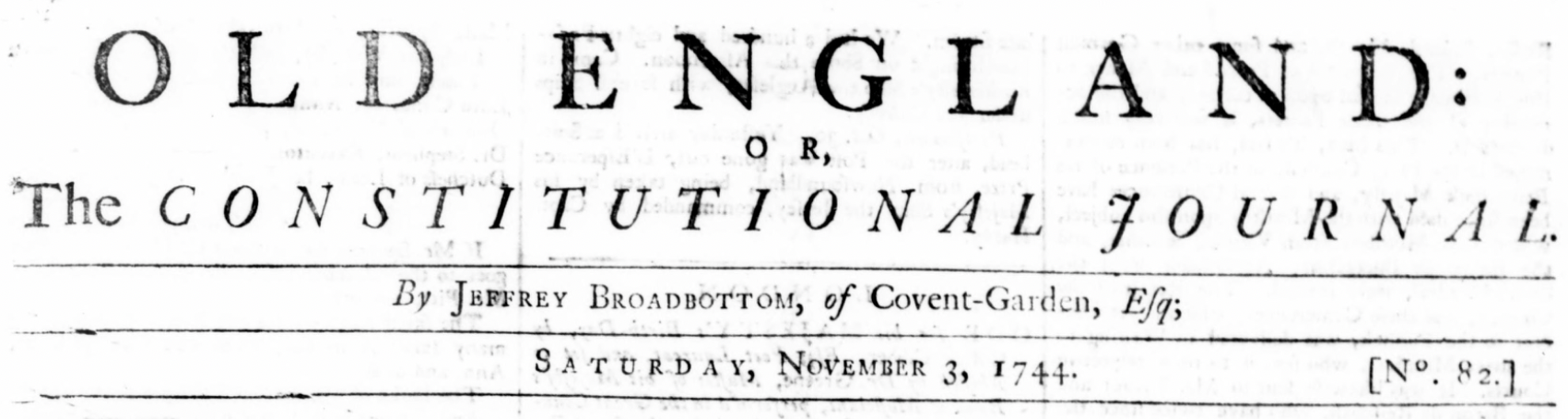
- Editor: William Guthrie; James Ralph
- Frequency: Weekly; occasional "Extraordinary" issues
- Founder: Philip Stanhope, 4th Earl of Chesterfield; George Bubb Dodington
- First issue: 5 February 1743
- Final issue: 1753 (as Old England’s Journal; retitled 1747, 1751)
- Country: Kingdom of Great Britain
- Based in: London, England
- Language: English

Old England: or the Constitutional Journal was a London political weekly launched on 5 February 1743. Backed by opposition leaders George Bubb Dodington and Philip Stanhope, 4th Earl of Chesterfield, and conducted chiefly by William Guthrie and James Ralph—often speaking in the house persona “Jeffrey Broadbottom”—it advanced a Country-Whig (“patriot”) critique of ministerial power, repeatedly attacking Britain's Hanoverian commitments and arguing for liberty of the press. Widely regarded as the most influential opposition paper of the early 1740s, it spurred rival weeklies and fed reprints in the magazines; several early issues were promptly republished as pamphlets.

Its prominence drew swift official notice. Renewed legal pressure followed the 1743 launch (including Guthrie's brief arrest), even as the paper's line helped to drive a wave of popular spin-offs. Allies praised its “truly British constitutional spirit” while ministerial voices denounced it as inflammatory. By early 1744 advertising filled much of each issue, an index of reach that later ebbed as fortunes shifted.

After many opposition backers entered office in late 1744, political support ceased and Guthrie and Ralph were pensioned and redirected to long-form histories. From a weakened base the journal in early 1745 offered only conditional reconciliation to the Broad Bottom ministry, then turned sharply critical in the spring—assailing Hanover-related subsidies and even the king's departure for Hanover—before rallying loyally after the Battle of Prestonpans and resuming opposition commentary in January 1746. By mid-1746 it castigated William Pitt’s support for Hanoverian troops and, from late that year, aligned with the Leicester House opposition; the suspension of Habeas corpus into 1747, the paper said, cramped its tone.

In early 1747 the journal adopted the house persona “Argus Centoculi” (after Argus Panoptes), under which it opposed a “shameful peace,” urged continuing the war to break French trade and colonial power, and framed politics as “ministerial” versus “patriot/opposition.” In 1749 it attacked proposed naval and military reforms during the Navy Bill controversy—warning, in the case of Admiral Edward Vernon, against elevating martial over common law. The “Argus Centoculi” byline disappears in January 1750, and the title continued under modified forms in the early 1750s amid a broader late-1740s shift toward a court–country divide and waning religious controversy.

== Publication ==
The periodical began with no. 1 on 5 February 1743 and continued to no. 178 on 27 September 1746. It was published in London and printed for J. Purser, with imprints in 1743 giving addresses in Bartholomew Close and later Red Lion Court, Fleet Street; an “Extraordinary” issue dated 19 May 1743 was issued “for M. Cooper in Paternoster Row” at six pence.

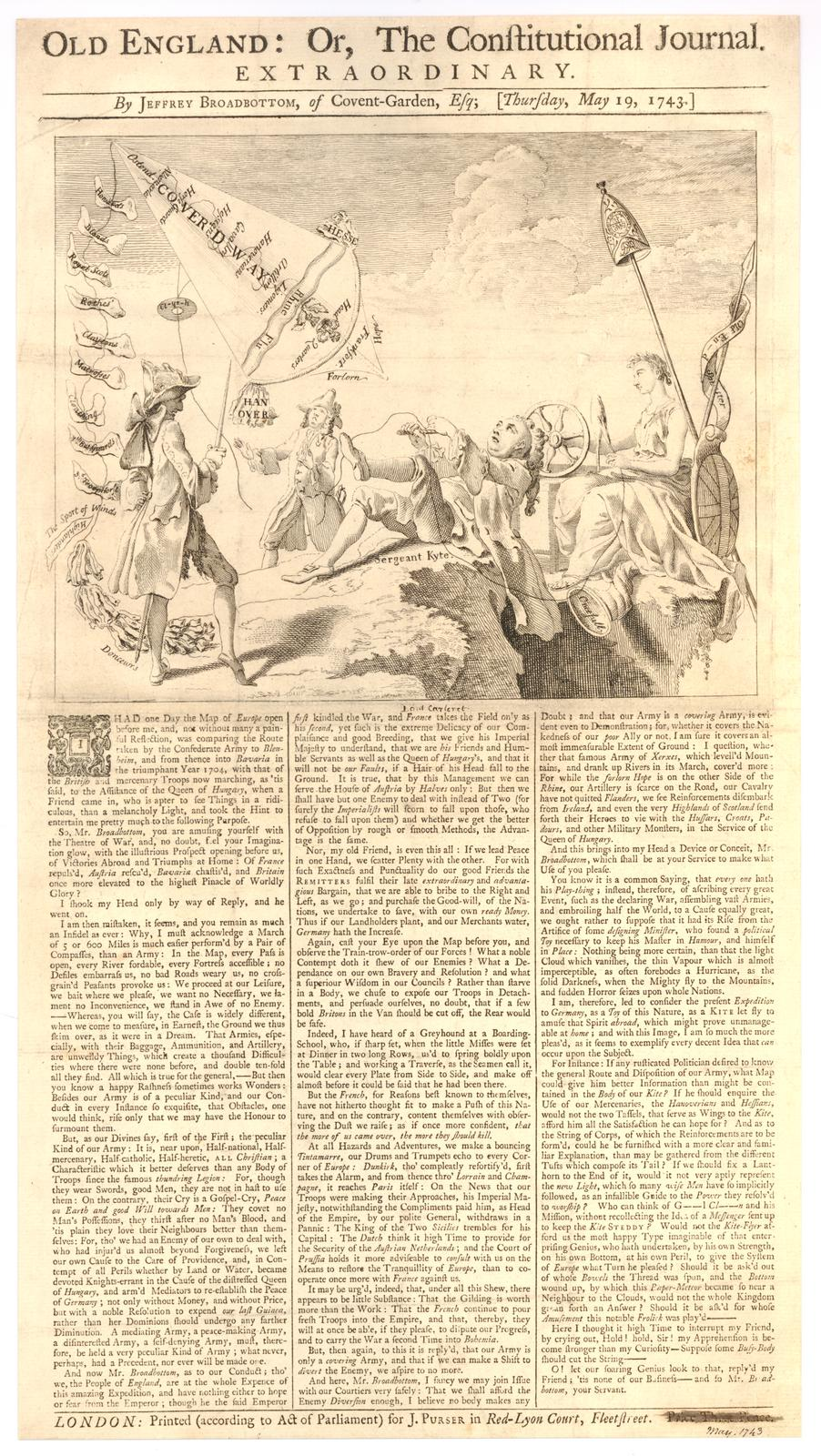
Old England: Or, The Constitutional Journal. Extraordinary (19 May 1743). Etching with letterpress issued “by Jeffrey Broadbottom,” attacking Carteret’s Hanover policy. British Museum, inv. 1868,0808.3732.

Early demand is indicated by rapid pamphlet reissues of material from the paper, including “Two letters publish’d in Old England” (B. Cowse, 1743) and “A collection of letters publish’d in Old England” (W. Webb, 1743); at least sixteen issues had been reprinted before the end of 1743 (nos. 1–10, 33–34, 36, 38–40). By early 1744 advertisements occupied more than half of many issues, prompting layout changes and coinciding with a marked contraction in domestic and foreign news; as the journal's influence waned after 1745, many advertisers migrated to rival titles. The advertising mix skewed toward medical notices rather than literary promotions, a pattern characteristic of opposition journals.

Title history. Old England; or the Constitutional Journal (5 Feb. 1743–27 Sept. 1746); retitled Old England; or, the Broad-Bottom Journal on 4 Oct. 1746; shortened to Old England on 11 July 1747; later styled Old England; or, The National Gazette from 6 Apr. 1751 and Old England's Journal in 1753. Some library catalogues date the 1746 retitling from 17 January 1747, likely reflecting the earliest surviving issues in those holdings rather than first adoption of the new title. A notice of 13 December 1746 reported increased sales, promised better paper and a larger page, and—“in order to make Room for other Advertisements”—stated that medicinal advertisements would be confined to the last page.

To elude the King's messengers, the imprint name on the colophon was altered three times between 1743 and 1744; in November 1743 John Purser's name was removed from the imprint, though he appears to have continued as the paper's de facto printer.

Surviving runs and digitizations show generally weekly issuance through 1743–1746, with occasional extra issues.

Provincial circulation was central to the London weeklies, but competition outside the capital intensified: the number of provincial weeklies rose from thirty-one to forty-two between 1740 and 1746, and London magazines offered provincial readers cheap synopses of weekly essays. Even so, more aggressively anti-ministerial journals—such as Old England—appear to have maintained their provincial position.

== History ==
=== Origins ===
Old England launched on 5 February 1743. Conceived as a direct opposition intervention led by Philip Stanhope, 4th Earl of Chesterfield with metropolitan allies in the Westminster Society of Independent Electors, it was coordinated by Chesterfield and George Bubb Dodington—as in other major opposition weeklies, effective control lay with political patrons rather than booksellers. They engaged William Guthrie—Common Sense’s chief writer—as principal author, with James Ralph to conduct the paper; by 1739/40 Ralph had come under Dodington's patronage. Chesterfield closely oversaw the operation and wrote the first essays himself; the opening issue even promised publication would cease once government was purged.

From the outset the paper drew on a metropolitan base beyond Parliament via the Westminster Society. Opposition Whigs publicly patronized the Society's anniversaries—stewards named in December 1743 for the following year included George Grenville and Dodington—helping knit those networks together. Early Westminster backing is also attested by a 2 March 1743/4 memorandum recording Thomas Paulin (a Covent Garden vestryman) offering to dispose of “half of the Constitutional Journal.”

Set against the post-Walpole reshuffle—The Craftsman weakened after its late-1730s split and Amhurst's departure, and Common Sense after Charles Molloy's exit—the new title filled that gap. Although Common Sense publicly denied any connection two weeks after Old England's launch (19 Feb. 1743), both papers were printed by John Purser at his Fleet Street office.

=== "Jeffrey Broadbottom" ===
From its first issue (5 February 1743) the journal, writing under the house signature “Jeffrey Broadbottom,” set out a “patriot” mission to vindicate the crown while asserting the people's interest against “foreign considerations,” grounding this in a contractualist reading of the constitution that affirmed the people had not surrendered the right to cashier a monarch who infringed English liberties. The opening statements also branded the new ministry a “prerogative administration” and protested that Hanoverian interests had been made the occasion for sacrificing English ones. Even so, the first issue struck a realist note: Chesterfield acknowledged widespread scepticism about the opposition's prospects.

In its second issue (12 February 1743) the paper cast the controversy as “National Independence” and “constitutional Allegiance” versus “immediate poverty” and “eventual slavery,” and publicised the Commons division lists on the Hanoverian troops (10 December 1742). The same issue attacked William Pulteney, alleging he had settled a £200 posthumous rent-charge on “an author” better known for abuse than reasoning—an allusion to Nicholas Amhurst. A week later (19 February) it disclaimed the Whig/Tory distinction—“for neither, yet for both”—to frame its stance as constitutional rather than partisan.

After the 1737 prosecutions officials had largely eased legal pressure, but Old England's launch in early 1743 triggered renewed action, signalled by same-day anti-Hanoverian essays also running in Common Sense. In March William Guthrie was arrested and his manuscripts seized (he was discharged within days), and the ministry sought unusually high bail and issued warrants for the issues of 12 and 19 March and 14 May 1743.

After the victory at Dettingen (June 1743) the paper downplayed the battle's significance, in contrast to the euphoric Westminster Journal. Through the summer it developed a constitutional critique that the Anglo-Hanoverian connection threatened English liberty by draining British resources and encouraging ministers willing to entrench arbitrary power—an early statement of what it cast as a “German war” at odds with national interests.

By the autumn, the paper's milieu helped drive a wave of populist spin-offs: edition sizes for A True Dialogue between a Trooper and a Serjeant and the print The Confectioner General Setting Forth the H—n—v—n Desert were abnormally high and distributed nationally, suggesting political rather than purely commercial motives; ministerial critics explicitly tied the Dialogue to Broad-Bottom tactics in the 1743–44 session. On 1 October it urged unity beyond party—“The scarlet sash is neither Whig or Tory.” Private correspondence registers the impact and official unease: on 9 October Charles Hanbury Williams told Henry Fox that the journals were “inflaming & malicious,” likening their stratagems to what “Machiavel ... would have been proud to have been father of,” while Thomas Birch's reports to Philip Yorke that year are dense with notices of Old England and ministers looked for ways to “bridle” it.

On the eve of the 1743–44 session the paper shifted to mobilisation: it pressed MPs’ “duty of attendance” and urged constituents to instruct their members to dismiss the 16,000 Hanoverian troops from British pay. In consecutive issues of 5 and 12 November it summarised the case and invoked the 1690s precedent when Parliament compelled William III to dismiss his Dutch Guards, arguing the goal was attainable and that many of the “old court party” would now support dismissal, while only “the worst of Hanoverians” would vote the other way. The issue of 12 November 1743 drew particular attention from the authorities and was specifically flagged for legal action.

On 3 December 1743, spurred by George II’s role at the head of the Pragmatic Army, the paper warned that the Anglo-Hanoverian union posed an immediate threat to English liberty: Hanover drained British power and wealth, and a monarch accustomed to arbitrary rule there would favour ministers ready to establish arbitrary government in Britain. Later in the month (24 December) it folded reports from the army into its case, alleging Hanoverian preference in supplies and quarters; year-end and New Year issues (31 December 1743; 7 January 1744) derided the campaign as a mere “parading pacifick scheme,” lampooning the Hanoverian commander as the “Confectioner General,” and leaned into anti-Hanoverian rhetoric—calling the Electorate “a province scarce known to the world” and contrasting alleged Hanoverian cowardice with the bravery of “free-born” Englishmen. Contemporaries spoke of the press's new force—the “artillery of the press”—a motif noted in the Gentleman's Magazine (Jan. 1744) and echoed in Old England on 19 January.

At the outset of the invasion scare the Crown notified both Houses—the king's message of 15 February and papers laid on 24 February—and the paper used the moment to press for scrutiny. In its issue of 25 February it argued that, if the danger were real, it demonstrated the imprudence of Carteret's policy and ministerial negligence, and, invoking the Act of Settlement 1701, asserted that Britain was “not obliged” to fight for Hanover without parliamentary consent. The Westminster Journal the same day derided panic as a mark of a “weak and little” mind. The paper then questioned the evidentiary basis (3 March) and, a week later (10 March), argued that the scare belied year-long ministerial claims about France's vulnerability. In the same weeks it attacked the plan to bring 6,000 Dutch troops for home defence, treating the invasion threat as a French feint to mask operations in the Austrian Netherlands. From late February a wave of “defensive loyalism” gathered pace; on 12 March Edward Weston urged printing the parliamentary papers to “convince Everybody of the Truth of Embarkation.” On 17 March the paper argued that the surge of loyal addresses disproved claims that the opposition favoured the Stuarts and that any encouragement to the regime's enemies arose from ministerial measures rather than opposition conduct, while pro-ministerial pamphleteers exploited revived popular animus toward France. On 29 March Treasury solicitor Nicholas Paxton told Newcastle that, given “the present Disposition of the People,” libel convictions could be secured, yet no prosecutions followed in 1744; instead the ministry relied on warrants and recognizances rather than risk a jury trial. Paxton's regular scrutiny of the press is attested more generally: at his death in 1744 the Post Office comptroller complained he still owed £72 “for the Country newspapers paid for out of my pocket for the Government Service,” and shortly before dying he was still recommending action against John Henley and personnel of Old England.

In April 1744 the paper widened its continental calculus. On 21 April it demanded an inquiry into the French account of the 1741 Hanoverian neutrality convention, and on 28 April restated its contention that Britain was being dragged into a “German war” unrelated to national interests, placing responsibility on Hanover. The same 28 April issue addressed the assault on the Barrier fortresses and offered only conditional support for continental commitments—“every true Briton” could support the ministry if the war were confined to defending the Barrier—warning that engaging for Hanover would make Britain “lose the very Benefit of being an Island.” On 12 May it argued that Frederick II would never permit Bavaria's despoliation and that Prussia “held the key” to the German balance of power; in the same issue it asked for information on the naval “miscarriage” at Toulon and called for an inquiry, even as deeper Toulon coverage was left largely to the Craftsman.

From late summer to autumn 1744 the paper returned to continental debate, addressing the Prussian manifesto and Frederick II's dispatch to London—widely reprinted texts that revisited the abortive Hanau terms and alleged Hanoverian motives in British policy (e.g., secularising Osnabrück, ceding Ostend). On 25 August it restated the “German war” frame (“The Balance of Europe ... the Balance of Germany rises in its place...”). On 1 September it claimed France had “nothing to dread from Holland,” and by late September Frederick was “the hero of our political malcontents.” A 15 September leader cast Carteret as the “evil Angel of B——n” who had “rode in the whirlwind,” warning that a Hanover-first policy endangered Britain's defence; the line was repeated in December, with Dutch caution read as recognition that British interests were being subordinated to Hanover. The paper also urged action: on 29 September it called on grand juries to petition for Carteret's removal (“ALL IS AT STAKE”); on 6 October it asked constituents to instruct their members; and in November it invoked Richard Empson to sharpen contrasts with Hanoverian priorities.

=== Realignment and the Jacobite rising ===
With the late-1744 change of guard, Old England lost its opposition backing and its editors were pensioned off: after Chesterfield, Dodington, and much of the opposition entered office, political support for the paper ceased, and the ministry neutralised it by granting William Guthrie and James Ralph about £200 per annum each (Ralph also became Dodington's private secretary). By the autumn of 1744 Guthrie and Ralph had stepped back from the paper's regular conduct, and their patrons redirected them to long-form histories—Guthrie's General History of England and Ralph's History of England during the Reigns of King William, Queen Anne, and King George I (published serially 1744–46; vol. 1 issued Jan. 1745).

Traces of the old voice lingered briefly. The house signature “Jeffrey Broadbottom” still appears on 12 January 1745 (a short notice praising The Female Spectator), and the same issue hinted at retirement while claiming that closing the journal would forgo “no inconsiderable” income. (Note: An earlier quip (23 June 1744) boasted of “three hundred and fifty or four hundred Persons (including Devils and all)” getting their bread by the paper.) Later in January a report circulated that Guthrie had accepted a place under the new administration; title notices of 26 Jan.–2 Mar. promised readers advance warning before any final issue, and on 9 March the paper instead announced that, having “no Prospect of any Alteration but for the worse,” it would continue publication.

From that weakened base, the paper in early 1745 offered only conditional reconciliation—support for the Broad-Bottom ministry if there were a “change of measures as well as men” (2 Feb.). The public mood was hardening: at the Westminster Society dinner on 15 February toasts ran “Great Britain unGermaniz’d” and “That German measures may never get the better of English liberty,” and on 16 February the journal again minimised party labels, arguing that an “old whig” and a “sensible Tory” alike sought that “the people of England ... be safe.”

That conditional stance became a programme of demands in March: on 2 March the paper pressed a quasi-Harringtonian case against the Septennial Act, calling longer parliaments “aristocratical,” and through the month it set out expected changes—end the continental land war, stop paying “foreign mercenaries,” and refocus on naval strength and trade. Amid pamphlet attacks on “patriot” Tories who had joined the ministry, it also defended Sir Watkin Williams Wynn against charges of court dependence (30 Mar.).

That programme hardened into frontal, constitutionally framed criticism in April–July 1745: on 20 April the paper denounced ministerial “H——sm” as “double distill’d,” citing reports that subsidy to the Queen of Hungary would take 8,000 troops onto the Austrian roll and that march-money had been eight (not six) weeks. On 11 May it attacked recent naval appointments and demanded an inquiry, and on 18 May it argued that the king, by leaving Britain for Hanover amid public calamity, had “done wrong” and risked forfeiting his crown—after which a warrant issued for the printer, publisher, and author. After Fontenoy, the tone hardened further: on 22 June it struck a strongly anti-French, “patriot” note, and on 6 July it complained that the personnel change had merely swapped “insolent mercenaries” for “treacherous Auxiliaries,” noting ministerial unease at popular anti-Dutch feeling; on 9 July Chesterfield reported public temper at its worst. Continued continental commitments sustained claims that Hanoverian interests still governed policy.

The Jacobite rising of 1745 then forced a rapid pivot to loyalism: as late as 21 September 1745 the paper was still attacking the ministry, but after the victory at Prestonpans that day it joined the loyal rally within a week. In the last week of September, as public credit tightened and a run on the Bank of England developed, London papers (Old England among them) publicised measures to restore confidence, and on 12 October the journal declared that the issue was the very “existence of our constitution.” Through the autumn it backed unconditional mobilisation and warned that local associations were prudent only as “Reservoirs” to supply central government.

Once the immediate emergency had passed, the journal was among the first opposition weeklies to resume criticism: on 4 January 1746 the editor announced a return to political commentary (flagging a temporary “borrow’d Extract” from The Occasional Writer), and on 18 January it blamed ministerial “ineffectual measures” for the rebels’ early success.

In 1746 a new alignment took hold: in February the paper castigated William Pitt's support for employing 18,000 Hanoverian troops as a volte-face emblematic of “modern patriotism,” and in the autumn the suspension of Habeas corpus (in force until February 1747) constrained its tone—on 4 October an essay personified the measure (“Habeas” was “muffled up”), a complaint repeated on 29 November and 6 December; the paper also blamed a spell of “dullness and caution” on the suspension. From late 1746 it supported the Leicester House opposition.

=== "Argus Centoculi" ===
By 17 January 1747 issues carried the house persona “Argus Centoculi”, (Note: “Argus Centoculi” literally means “Argus of a hundred eyes,” invoking Argus Panoptes, the many-eyed watchman of Greek myth; centoculi is the Latin “hundred-eyed.”) Inspector(-General) of Great-Britain. The identity behind the byline is unknown. In early 1747 debate had shifted toward Anglo-French commercial rivalry and defence of the Austrian Netherlands/Low Countries; William Horsley (2 January) called the “two great points” “the preservation of our Trade, and Ruin of that of the Enemy.” The journal also repeated its habeas-related “dullness and caution” note on 17 January and 7 February 1747.

In the 1746–47 peace debates it argued against a “shameful peace” and—alongside the Westminster Journal and the London Evening Post—urged continuing the war to capture French trade and colonies as the surest way to expand revenues and ease the national debt; even the ministry's closing-session speech acknowledged how naval success was reshaping prospects. By late 1747 allied opposition print lamented disillusionment with the “patriot” cause; the new Remembrancer—a Leicester House weekly edited by James Ralph (formerly co-editor of Old England)— blamed the decade's “abuse of confidence.”

Through the later 1740s the journal framed politics as “ministerial” versus “patriot/opposition” and, under the Argus byline, pressed a constitutional line against ministerial centralisation and professionalised military discipline. In 1749, entering the Navy Bill controversy, it warned on 11 March that Admiral Edward Vernon had been “arbitrarily cashiered,” and on 18 March argued that proposed reforms risked elevating martial law over common law.

The “Argus Centoculi” byline is last attested on 13 January 1750 (no. 303); subsequent issues continued without the persona.

== Reception ==
Contemporaries were sharply divided. William Pitt praised the paper as written with “a truly British constitutional spirit,” while the Marquess of Hartington condemned it as “direct treason” that would bring about “an end of government.”

Prominence was visible early: in its third issue (19 Feb. 1743) the paper boasted a maximum weekly print-run of 193,000 (implausible, but revealing of confidence); early issues were reissued as pamphlets, sometimes in multiple editions, and by the second half of 1743 it had largely displaced the long-running Craftsman among essays reprinted by the Gentleman’s Magazine and the London Magazine. Domestic politics amplified this impact: anger at the narrow post-Walpole settlement—especially Pulteney's perceived “betrayal”—sharpened both content and reception.

Ministers and allied writers cast the journal as dangerously inflammatory. A pro-ministerial pamphleteer claimed he “should fill a volume” with its “seditious, insolent, even treasonable” paragraphs though it was “scarce a year's standing.” After a general easing of prosecutions post-1737, official action revived in 1743 specifically in response to Old England. Contemporaries also warned such cases could backfire: one 1730 tract said proprietors sometimes wrote pieces hoping to be “sent for by a Messenger,” and another reckoned a fine might be only “a Quarter of a Year's Gain”; in 1734 the Attorney General similarly advised that prosecuting would make a paper “read by thousands” who otherwise would not see it.

Its reach fed a wave of populist spin-offs in autumn 1743. Two items—the cheap pamphlet A True Dialogue between a Trooper and a Serjeant and the satirical print The Confectioner General Setting Forth the H—n—v—n Desert—were issued in abnormally large editions (one witness claimed 11,000 copies of the Dialogue); the print also circulated nationally.

Rivals followed its lead. As with The Craftsman in the late 1720s, Old England’s success spurred demand for political comment and pushed other weeklies to imitate it; the Westminster Journal especially echoed its attacks on Hanoverian influence—by February 1744 the pro-ministerial pamphlet A Vindication of our Present Royal Family remarked that the Westminster Journal and its “colleague of the week” (Old England) outdid all predecessors “in virulence, scandal, and violence.”

== Legacy ==
Old England is widely judged the pre-eminent opposition weekly of the early 1740s, credited with expanding demand for political comment and pushing rival weeklies—especially the Westminster Journal—to imitate its anti-Hanover line. Its campaigning repertoire—house personae, serial constitutional essays, and extra-parliamentary mobilisation (e.g., calls for grand-jury petitions to remove Carteret)—helped define opposition press tactics. Historians place it as the Broad-Bottom opposition's principal press organ in 1743–44 and, after many backers entered office, as one of the ministry's sharpest critics by early 1745—an arc that maps the period's fluid political alignments. By the late 1740s its edge had faded; the bookseller John Banks later described both Old England and the Westminster Journal as being written “without offence to any party.”

For scholars, Old England remains a key source on Country-Whig constitutional rhetoric—especially critiques of the Anglo-Hanoverian connection and arguments for the liberty of the press.

== See also ==
- The Craftsman
- Jacobite rising of 1745
- War of the Austrian Succession
- History of British newspapers
- Burney Collection of Newspapers
- Press freedom in the United Kingdom

== Sources ==
=== Secondary literature ===
- Dann, Ulrike (1991). Hanover and Great Britain, 1740–60: Diplomacy and Survival. Leicester: Leicester University Press.
- Dew, Ben (2018). "8: Economic statecraft and economic progress—William Guthrie's General History". Commerce, finance and statecraft: Histories of England, 1600–1780. Manchester University Press. pp. 155–168. doi:10.7765/9781526151605.00016.
- Harris, Michael (1987). London Newspapers in the Age of Walpole: A Study of the Origins of the Modern English Press. Rutherford, NJ: Fairleigh Dickinson University Press; Associated University Presses. ISBN 978-0-8386-3273-4.
- Harris, Robert (1993). A Patriot Press: National Politics and the London Press in the 1740s. Oxford: Oxford University Press.
- "Argus". Encyclopaedia Britannica. Encyclopaedia Britannica, Inc. 3 July 2025.
- Lewis, Charlton T.; Short, Charles (1879). A Latin Dictionary (in Latin). Oxford: Clarendon Press. "s.v. centoculus"
- Kenny, Robert W. (1940). "James Ralph: An Eighteenth-Century Philadelphian in Grub Street". The Pennsylvania Magazine of History and Biography. 64 (2): 218–242. JSTOR 20087279.
- Kinkel, Sarah (2013). "Disorder, Discipline, and Naval Reform in Mid-Eighteenth-Century Britain". The English Historical Review. 128 (535): 1451–1482. doi:10.1093/ehr/cet273.
- Mari, William Thomas (2015). "Writer by Trade: James Ralph's Claims to Authorship". Authorship. 4 (2). doi:10.21825/aj.v4i2.1439.
- Okie, Laird (1991). Augustan Historical Writing: Historiography in England, 1688–1750. Lanham, MD: University Press of America.
- Shipley, John B. (1963). James Ralph: Pretender to Genius (PhD thesis). New York: Columbia University.
- Spedding, Patrick (2016). "Unfortunate Delays in Publishing the Bibliothèque Britannique" (PDF). Script & Print. 40 (3): 154–173.

=== Catalogues & digital resources ===
- British Museum (2025). "Old England: or, the Constitutional Journal (Object 1860,0623.111.78)". British Museum Collection Online.
- Gale (2025). "Early English Newspapers — Reel listing (Old England; or, The Constitutional Journal)" (PDF). Gale Primary Sources.
- Grub Street Project (2025). "William Webb junior — works (incl. A collection of letters publish'd in Old England)". The Grub Street Project.
- HKU Libraries (2025). "Old England, or, The constitutional journal (Online)". University of Hong Kong Libraries — Burney Collection entry.
- Internet Archive (18 June 2021). "Old England 1744-11-03: Vol. 1–3, no. 82". Internet Archive.
- Morgan Library and Museum (2025). "Old England: or, the constitutional journal. Extraordinary. By Jeffrey Broadbottom, of Covent-Garden, Esq (May 19, 1743)". Morgan Library & Museum.
- "Old England / by Argus Centoculi, Inspector-General of Great-Britain". ICON: International Coalition on Newspapers. Center for Research Libraries.
- New York Public Library (2025). "The thistle; a dispassionate examine … In a letter to the author of Old England of Dec. 27, 1746. Contains also: Old England; or, The Broadbottom Journal. By Argus Centoculi, Inspector-General of Great-Britain". NYPL Research Catalog.
- "Attributions of Authorship in the Gentleman's Magazine". University of Virginia (BSUVA). 2025.
- State and University Library Göttingen (2025). "17th–18th Century Burney Collection Newspapers (imprint strings showing J. Purser addresses, 1743)". SUB Göttingen.
