= The Case of Authors by Profession =

1758 pamphlet on literary economics by James Ralph

The Case of Authors by Profession or Trade, Stated
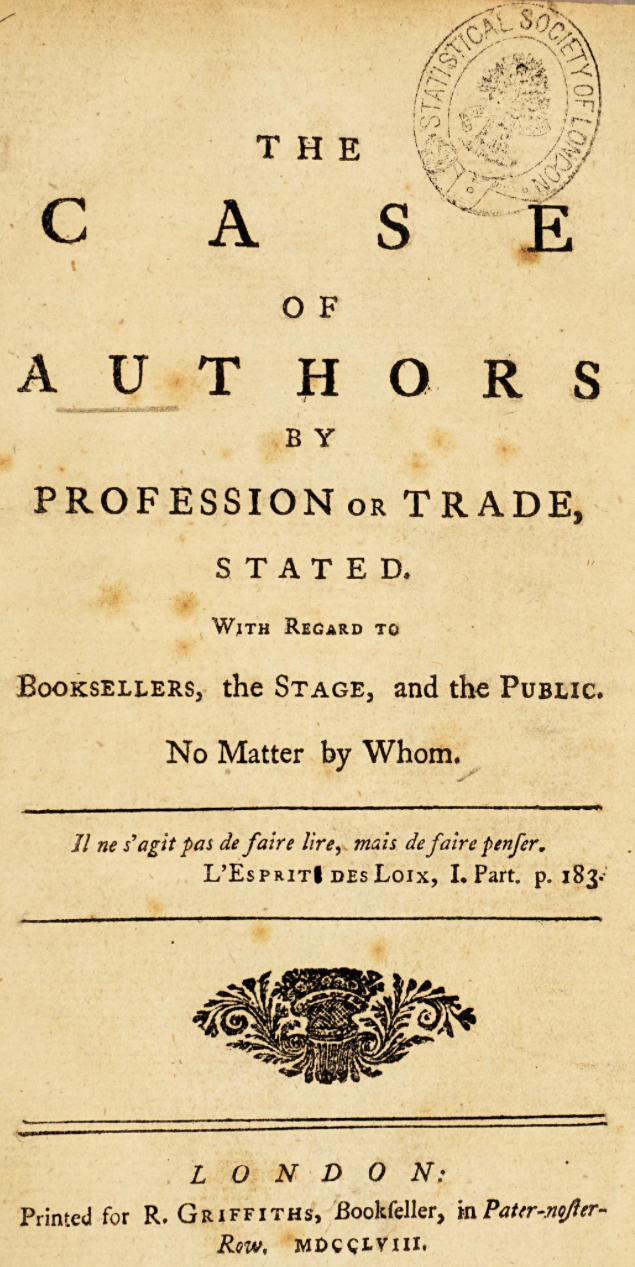
- Title page of the 1758 pamphlet
- Author: James Ralph
- Language: English
- Genre: Literary criticism, political economy
- Publisher: Printed for R. Griffiths
- Publication date: March 1758
- Publication place: Great Britain
- Media type: Print (pamphlet)
- Pages: 76

The Case of Authors by Profession or Trade, Stated is a 1758 anonymous pamphlet, generally attributed to political writer James Ralph. It critiques the conditions of authorship in mid-eighteenth-century Britain—especially the market power of booksellers and theatre managers—and maps three “provinces” open to a writer: the book trade, the stage, and partisan politics. Arguing that aristocratic patronage had waned, it defends paid authorship as a respectable livelihood and offers an early reflection on journalistic authorship and the commercialisation of the press.

Informed by Ralph’s Walpole-era experiences, the pamphlet urges collective self-help and institutional remedies: it appeals for combination among writers, proposes a national body to regularise rewards, and assigns the press a civic role. It also distinguishes between “volunteer” writers and “writers by trade,” presses for authors to be judged by merit, and protests practices such as unauthorised reprinting that, it claims, leave authors unrewarded.

Contemporary notices in the Monthly Review and Critical Review praised its fairness. Parallels have been drawn with Oliver Goldsmith’s The Present State of Polite Learning in Europe (1759), and later writers such as Isaac D'Israeli echoed its themes in Calamities of Authors (1812). Modern scholarship treats the pamphlet as an early, comprehensive defence of professional authorship and a notable contribution to debates over authors’ rights and the history of copyright.

== Publication and editions ==
The pamphlet was entered at Stationers’ Hall on 10 March 1758 and printed for the bookseller R. Griffiths of Paternoster Row. The pamphlet appeared without an author’s name; subsequent scholarship has generally attributed it to James Ralph. Advertised at a price of one shilling, it saw moderate success and was reprinted in 1762 before falling into obscurity. In 1966 it was reissued in an edition edited by Philip Stevick, bound with Ralph’s 1739 Champion essay contrasting his critical practice with that of the Grub Street Journal. Some surviving copies misnumber pages 73–76 as 65–68.

=== Attribution ===
The pamphlet appeared anonymously with the title-page formula “No Matter by Whom”; a later issue bore “J. R.” on the title page. Contemporary and later notices attributed it to James Ralph: Thomas Davies named Ralph in his Life of Garrick, the Dictionary of National Biography accepted the attribution, and modern scholars have generally followed suit.

== Contents and arguments ==
The Case of Authors by Profession or Trade, Stated is cast as four “letters to a young Author,” criticising the influence of booksellers, theatre managers, and impresarios who “presume to purchase Genius at second-hand.” It sets out three “provinces” open to a writer—booksellers, the stage, and political factions—and distinguishes the “Voluntier-Writer” from the “Writer by Trade,” noting the precarious position of those between patronage and semi-self-support; “Voluntier-Writers” are dismissed as “Holiday-Writers,” while Thomas Gordon is cited as a “Writer by Accident, not by Profession,” cushioned by patronage.

On the book trade, it argues that booksellers—often also printers—exercised “absolute” control over publication (timing, market fit, and pay), retaining the profits; “the Rules of Trade oblige him to buy as cheap and sell as dear as possible.” It adds that periodicals “retale” authors’ work, coffee-houses subscribe to it, and circulating libraries lend it, so that an author “may be read every where, rewarded no where,” unlike performers who are paid for their labour. Summarising such conditions, it likens the writer’s lot to that of “the Slave in the Mines.”

For the stage, it claims authors faced “more Difficulties to struggle with … than in any other,” especially after the 1737 licensing regime reduced venues. Managers “claim also the Custody of the Muse,” pronounce authors “impotent,” and deny further opportunities—“even the Bookseller is a perfect Maecenas compar’d to the Manager.” It rejects theatrical “infallibility,” citing misjudgments such as Colley Cibber’s refusal of The Beggar's Opera, David Garrick’s rejection of Robert Dodsley’s Cleone, and the turn-down of John Home’s Douglas. While praising Garrick, it denies that “the Stage was made only for him,” and advises those unwilling to “stoop as low to a Manager … as to a Minister” to “take Refuge in Grub Street”.

Political writing is described as “the most flattering of all” but the narrowest, with prestige offset by the risk of being disowned if work proves too bold or too tame; party success often leaves writers “like an unregarded Bulrush on the Stream to rot itself with Motion,” as in the case of Nicholas Amhurst. It contrasts an earlier moment—when a good writer’s talents could open employment—with the subsidised press of the 1720s–1730s, where partisan funding eroded “merit” and left many reliant on vague assurances from “Confederates in a superior Station.”

== Themes and proposals ==
The Case of Authors by Profession or Trade, Stated defends paid authorship as legitimate labour and asserts that “Authors, like other Men” must live by their work, rejecting the prejudice that “he who aims at Praise ought to be starved.”

It explicitly includes journalists and other non-patroned writers within “professional” authorship (in a mid-eighteenth-century sense), extending respectability and limited independence from political and financial pressures and staking a coherent identity for “writers for hire.”

It sketches an internal hierarchy among men of letters, criticising “Voluntier-Writers” and “half Squire, half Author” figures who look down on “Pen-and-ink Laborer[s],” while insisting that “a Man who writes to live may set as high a Value on Character, as he that writes to make one.” It adds that many authors cannot readily change trades, and that continual practice confers mastery.

On reward and status, it claims writers have “as good a Right to the Product in Money” as landowners have to rent; urges that authors be judged by the quality and originality of their work (invoking Montesquieu that “Those who are excellent in any Profession will set their own Price”); and complains that writing is undervalued relative to trades serving immediate bodily needs.

It articulates a civic hierarchy that places public spirit above material gain and praises literature’s contribution to the “Luxury of the Mind,” defending writers for enlarging public happiness.

Addressed “To the Few,” it calls on writers to pursue combination and mutual support (“power is what all covet”), proposes a national “Society for Incouraging Arts and Sciences” to register titles and guarantee royalties, and suggests public rewards such as pensions. It also warns of a “Glut of Writing,” urges clearer distinctions between full-time writers and “Freebooters”, and bids authors to “out-combine the very Booksellers themselves.”

A brief contemporary frame underlies these claims: journalism sat on the “fringes of professional status” within an increasingly politicised, commercialised press that ministries funded and critics accused of putting “culture for sale”; by mid-century “journalist” had become a catch-all for periodical (and increasingly newspaper) writers.

== Biographical context ==
Scholars note that The Case of Authors is grounded in Ralph’s own working life as a “writer by trade,” which he openly foregrounds—one reason he is “not always a reliable historical narrator.” His long stint in periodical journalism across the 1730s–1740s (including work on The Champion, Old England, and The Remembrancer) underpins the tract’s retrospective on the Walpole “Heat of Opposition.” Warnings about promises from “Confederates in a superior Station” and the image of being left “like an unregarded Bulrush” reflect the precarious party work he knew first-hand.

His complaints about booksellers’ control and about magazines, coffee-houses, and circulating libraries that left authors “read every where, rewarded no where” match a working journalist’s vantage point. So too his remarks on stage managers and the post-1737 licensing constraints. The program—writer “combination,” a registering society, and “out-combining” the booksellers—translates career instability into institutional remedies. For Ralph’s career in full, see James Ralph.

Set against a waning system of aristocratic patronage, the tract’s basic premise is that “Authors, like other Men … [must] live by their Labour.”

== Reception ==
Contemporary notices in the Monthly Review and Critical Review praised The Case of Authors as a fair account of the difficulties facing professional authors. The Monthly Review noted its treatment of “instances of neglect and grievance” affecting contemporary writers, and one observer commended its “plain dealing.”

== Contemporary influence ==
Parallels have been drawn between The Case of Authors and Oliver Goldsmith’s The Present State of Polite Learning in Europe (1759), suggesting the two may have discussed the condition of professional authors while working together at the Monthly Review. Goldsmith’s work echoes the pamphlet’s themes: contempt for authors and the “unpardonable offence” of writing for money; Hogarth’s observation that money may be preferred to fame; advice on courting managers; and the view that working for booksellers was the lesser evil for the unpatronised author. He also adopts its depiction of the author’s precarious economic dependence and, like Ralph, criticises theatrical managers for caprice and favouritism—remarks that drew Garrick’s ire, though Ralph’s were the more direct.

== Legacy ==
Scholars view The Case of Authors by Profession or Trade, Stated as an early reflection on journalistic authorship and on the legitimation, commercialization, and politicization of writing in mid-eighteenth-century London. It has been identified as the earliest comprehensive defence of authorship as a profession at a time when aristocratic patronage was waning and a general reading public was not yet firmly established, and as significant for debates on authors’ rights and the early history of copyright. It has also been described as “the first defense of writers as professionals ever written” and a turning point in the history of letters, linked to earlier criticisms of booksellers’ combinations and to the post-1737 licensing regime; further, it is characterised as the culminating expression of its author’s career and an original contribution to contemporary literary debate.

As historical evidence, the tract is coloured by Ralph’s self-positioning (see Biographical context). Other readings describe its tone as pessimistic and its programme as conflicted, yet emphasise its clear mid-century claim that periodical writers (journalists) could be legitimate authors.

In the nineteenth century, Isaac D'Israeli’s Calamities of Authors (1812) echoed the pamphlet’s title, repeated details (including Gemelli’s remark on England’s writings), adopted turns of phrase, and closely paraphrased its account of opposition writers being abandoned once patrons gained power. Kenny argues that D’Israeli “did not bother to acknowledge his indebtedness,” adding that the tract was “good enough to paraphrase and quote, but not sufficiently important to acknowledge as a source”; anonymity (“No Matter by Whom”; later “J. R.”) was no obstacle, since D’Israeli specialised in such literary mysteries and Ralph’s authorship had been recorded by Thomas Davies in Life of Garrick.

The Case of Authors by Profession or Trade, Stated registers a transitional moment when writing was neither fully sustained by patrons nor reliably supported by emerging publics, illuminating the commercialization of periodical literature and why Ralph’s intervention remains worth revisiting.

== See also ==
- Grub Street
- Bookselling
- Copyright history

== Sources ==
- "The Case of Authors by Profession or Trade, Stated". English Short-Title Catalogue (ESTC). British Library. 1758.
- Harris, Bob (1993). A Patriot Press: National Politics and the London Press in the 1740s. Oxford University Press. pp. 50–51.
- Kenny, Robert W. (1940). "James Ralph: An Eighteenth-Century Philadelphian in Grub Street". The Pennsylvania Magazine of History and Biography. 64 (2): 218–242. JSTOR 20087279.
- Mari, William Thomas (2015). "Writer by Trade: James Ralph's Claims to Authorship". Authorship. 4 (2). doi:10.21825/aj.v4i2.1439.
- McKinsey, Elizabeth R. (1973). "James Ralph: The Professional Writer Comes of Age". Proceedings of the American Philosophical Society. 117 (1): 59–78. JSTOR 985948.
- Okie, Laird (1967). "James Ralph: An Eighteenth‑Century Professional Writer". Huntington Library Quarterly. 30 (4).
- Ralph, James (1758). The Case of Authors by Profession or Trade, Stated (PDF). London: R. Griffiths.
- Stephen, Leslie (1896). "Ralph, James". In Leslie Stephen (ed.). Dictionary of National Biography. Vol. 47. London: Smith, Elder & Co. pp. 286–287.
