= Calamities of Authors =

Calamities of Authors (1812) is a work by Isaac D'Israeli that explores the strugglesfaced by various writers. It was published within his Miscellanies.

Scholars have noted that its opening chapters—“Authors by Profession” and “The Case of Authors Stated”—echo the title and arguments of James Ralph’s 1758 pamphlet The Case of Authors by Profession or Trade, Stated, closely paraphrasing Ralph on, for example, the fate of opposition writers after changes of ministry. One study argues that D’Israeli did not acknowledge this indebtedness, despite contemporary attributions of Ralph's authorship.

== Sources ==
- Kenny, Robert W. (1940). "James Ralph: An Eighteenth-Century Philadelphian in Grub Street". The Pennsylvania Magazine of History and Biography. 64 (2): 239–241. JSTOR 20087279.
- Smollett, Tobias George (1812). "Review of Calamities of Authors". The Critical review, or, Annals of literature. W. Simpkin and R. Marshall.
