= The Fashionable Lady =

1730 play/ballad opera by James Ralph

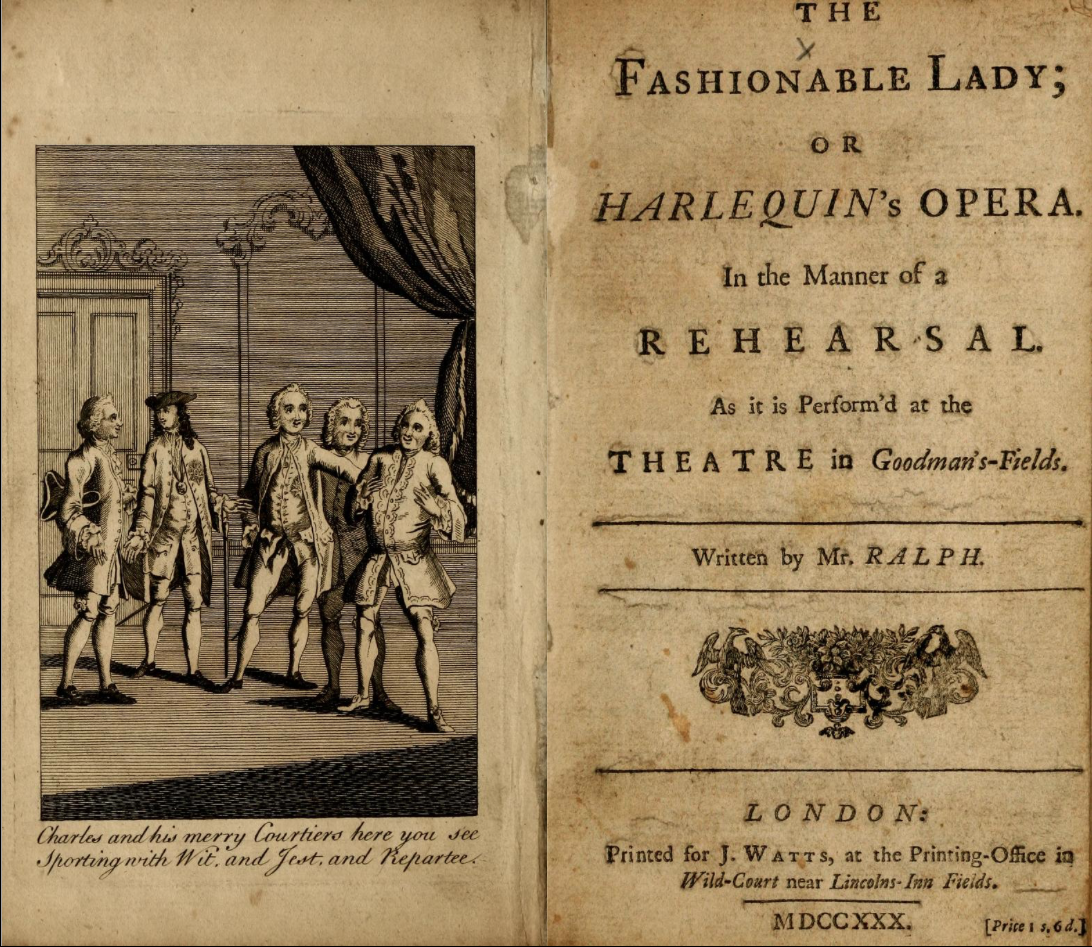
- Original language: English
- Written by: James Ralph
- Genre: Ballad opera

Premiere
- Date: April 2, 1730
- Place: Goodman's Fields Theatre

The Fashionable Lady; or, Harlequin's Opera is a 1730 ballad opera by James Ralph. It premiered at Goodman's Fields Theatre on 2 April 1730, with further performances recorded through December 1730 and May 1731. Framed "in the manner of a rehearsal", it interleaves dialogue with ballad airs adapted to familiar tunes and lampoons English drama, theatre management, and the vogue for Italian opera in a style recalling The Beggar's Opera.

Critical assessments have varied: Elizabeth R. McKinsey called it "a hyperbolic take-off" and "a mediocre play about writing a bad play", while nineteenth-century theatre historian John Genest recorded that it "met with tolerable success" and was "not badly written". The work has often been described as the first play on the London stage written by an American; later research established that Ralph was born in London, though some musicological commentary has continued to style it "the first opera by an American".

== Background and production ==
James Ralph turned to satire and stage work after the cool reception of his early serious poems, collaborating in the theatre from 1729 (including the prologue to Henry Fielding's The Temple Beau). The play premiered at Goodman's Fields Theatre on 2 April 1730; the printed text was issued for J. Watts and advertised in the Daily Post that day.

== Synopsis ==
Framed "in the manner of a rehearsal", the play opens with Mr Meanwell, Mr Ballad and Mr Modely disputing English versus Italian opera as entertainment for a wedding, before they resolve to "call in the Players" and begin Mr Drama's piece. Mr Drama explains that Ballad has supplied "a whole Quire of Songs, adapted to old Tunes", and the rehearsal proceeds as a meta-theatrical mixture of dialogue and ballad airs. Scenes then alternate between debates on taste and episodes of fashionable intrigue, with airs on love, fashion and seafaring punctuating the action. In Act III the satire turns judicial when Sir Peevish Terrible convenes a mock court "in the manner of a Court of Justice" to try Harlequin, with several poets attending as assistants, before the company moves on to further airs and a concluding ensemble.

== Music ==
The printed text supplies a "Table of the Songs" listing sixty-eight numbered airs across three acts. Within the dialogue the songs are described as "adapted to old Tunes". Vanessa L. Rogers identifies two of the airs as French vaudevilles: Air 24, "Plus inconstant que l'Onde & le Nuage", and Air 16, "Mirleton" (used earlier by John Gay in Polly). (For context on the repertoire, see the Théâtre de la foire tradition.) The 1730 print also labels several airs by familiar English tune-headings, including "A Cobler there was" (Air I), "An old Woman poor and blind" (Air II), "Sleepy Body" (Air XXVIII), and "The Twircher" (Air LV); one scene calls for "an excellent new Ballad! to the Tune of London Bridge is broken", and a later air is set to "My Chloe, why d'ye slight me".

== Performance history ==
It was performed at Goodman's Fields Theatre on 2, 4, 13, 18, 21, and 23 April; 28 May; 2 and 17 June; 27 July; 11 November; 4 December 1730; and 4 May 1731.

== Cast ==
=== Men ===
- Mr Ballad – Mr Penkethman
- Mr Meanwell – Mr W. Giffard
- Mr Modely – Mr Bullock
- Mr Drama – Mr Lacy
- Mr Merit – Mr W. Williams
- Mr Smooth – Mrs Thomas
- Captain Hackum – Mr Huddy
- Mr Whim – Mr Smith
- Mr Trifle – Mr Collett
- Voice, Harlequin's Man – Mr Bardin

=== Women ===
- Mrs Foible – Mrs Mountfort
- Mrs Sprightly – Mrs Giffard
- Prattle – Mrs Palmer

=== Mutes ===
- Harlequin – Mr Burney, Jun.
- Scaramouch – Sandham
- Pierot – Eaton
- Punch – R. Williams
- Pantaloon – Dukes
- Colombine

Sir Peevish Terrible the Critick, Poets, Sailors, Gods, Goddesses, Witches, Dragons, Devis, &c.

== Style and reception ==
The Fashionable Lady lampoons the state of English drama, contemporary theatre management, and the vogue for Italian opera; its dialogue follows the Congreve–Vanbrugh school, and the action is punctuated by songs to familiar airs, recalling The Beggar's Opera. Its dramatis personae include types such as Mr Ballad, Mrs Prattle, Messrs Modely, Hackum, and Trifle, and Sir Peevish Terrible, the critic. This theatrical satire parallels Ralph's earlier essays in The Touch-Stone, which mocked Italian opera for "singing in an unknown dialect". It also engages self-reflexively with the commercial ethos of ballad opera; one character quips, "All Poets. Ay, ay, any thing for Money."

Assessments of the play vary: Elizabeth R. McKinsey has called it "a hyperbolic take-off" on The Beggar's Opera, describing it as "a mediocre play about writing a bad play" and likening it to Federico Fellini's 8½, "a bad movie about making a bad movie". In contrast, nineteenth-century theatre historian John Genest recorded that it "met with tolerable success" and was "not badly written".

== Legacy and designation ==
Although The Fashionable Lady has often been described as the first play on the London stage written by an American, archival research published in 1964 established that Ralph was born in London around 1705. Some later musicological commentary has also styled it "the first opera by an American".

== Sources ==
- London Stage Database (n.d.). "17 June 1730 @ Goodman's Fields: The Fashionable Lady". University of Oregon.
- Burling, William J. (1992). A Checklist of New Plays and Entertainments on the London Stage, 1700–1737. Rutherford, New Jersey; London; Cranbury, New Jersey: Fairleigh Dickinson University Press; Associated University Presses. ISBN 0838634516 – via Internet Archive.
- Genest, John (1832). Some Account of the English Stage from the Restoration in 1660 to 1830. Vol. 3. Bath: H. E. Carrington. hdl:2027/hvd.32044100891365.
- Harris, R. (1935). "Ralph, James". Dictionary of American Biography. Vol. 15. New York: Charles Scribner's Sons.
- Hughes, Merritt Y. (1922). James Ralph, Political Writer and Historian. University of Wisconsin Studies in Language and Literature. Vol. 14. Madison: University of Wisconsin – via Internet Archive.
- Kenny, Robert W. (1940). "James Ralph: An Eighteenth-Century Philadelphian in Grub Street". Pennsylvania Magazine of History and Biography. 64 (2): 218–242. JSTOR 20087279.
- McKay, David P. (1979). "The Fashionable Lady: The First Opera by an American". The Musical Quarterly. 65 (3): 360–367. doi:10.1093/mq/LXV.3.360. JSTOR 741490.
- McKinsey, Elizabeth R. (1973). "James Ralph: The Professional Writer Comes of Age". Proceedings of the American Philosophical Society. 117 (1): 59–78. JSTOR 985948.
- Nicoll, Allardyce (1929). A History of Early Eighteenth Century Drama: 1700–1750 (2nd ed.). Cambridge: Cambridge University Press.
- Ralph, James (1730). The Fashionable Lady; or, Harlequin's Opera. In the manner of a rehearsal. As it is perform'd at the Theatre in Goodman's-Fields. London: J. Watts – via Internet Archive.
- Rodgers, Michael (2011). Ballad Opera, Imitation, and the Formation of Genre (PhD dissertation). Northwestern University.
- Rogers, Vanessa L. (2014). "John Gay, Ballad Opera and the Théâtres de la foire". Eighteenth-Century Music. 11 (2): 173–213. doi:10.1017/S1478570614000049.
- Shipley, John B. (1964). "James Ralph's Place and Date of Birth". American Literature. 36 (3): 343–346. JSTOR 2923549.
