= The Temple Beau =

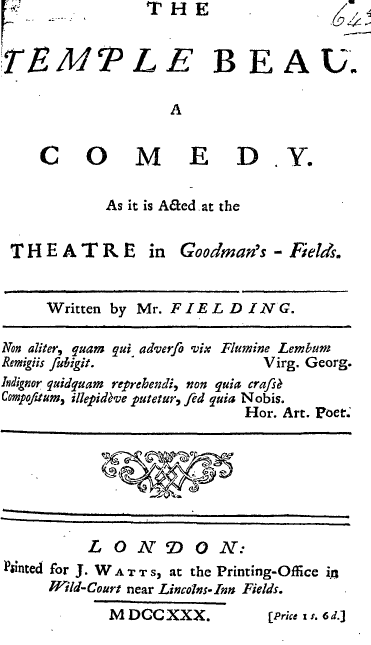
Titlepage to The Temple Beau: a Comedy

The Temple Beau is a play by Henry Fielding. It was first performed on 26 January 1730, at Goodman's Fields after it was rejected by the Theatre Royal. The play, well received at Goodman's Fields, depicts a young law student forsaking his studies for pleasure. By portraying hypocrisy in a comedic manner, Fielding shifts his focus from a discussion of love and lovers.

The play's relative success when compared to other plays at Goodman's Fields was in part caused by the relative freedom granted by Goodman's Fields, though the play was not dramatically different from Fielding's first play, Love in Several Masques. No contemporary reviews exist. Modern critics generally view it as an improvement in Fielding's playwriting while still considering it to have several weaknesses.

== Background ==
Fielding wrote The Temple Beau sometime after leaving Leiden in April 1729. It was the fourth play that Fielding wrote and he finished it by the end of 1729. Although his first play was performed at the Theatre Royal, The Temple Beau was rejected by the theatre. He turned to Goodman's Fields and the play was first advertised, in the 16 January 1730 Daily Journal, as being rehearsed and to open 22 January. A deferral notice was posted on 22 January 1730 in the Daily Journal and Daily Courant stating that the play would open 26 January.

It first ran on 26 January 1730 at Goodman's Fields, a new theatre that first opened 31 October 1729. The play was the first new play staged at Goodman's Fields and it ran for nine nights until 5 February 1730. Three of the nights were author's benefits. For the first author's benefit on 28 January, Fielding added a new song titled "Like the Whig and the Tory". Later showings of the play came immediately on 10 February and 3 March 1730. Other revivals included showings on 5 June and 9 July 1730 but it slowly disappeared, with only two showings the next year, on 13 March and 4 December 1731, and a later revival in 1736 on 25 March and 27 April, all taking place at Goodman's Fields. A revised version of the play titled The Temple Beau; or, The Intriguing Sisters was performed on 21 September 1782 at the Haymarket theatre.

On 2 February 1730, it was published along with a prologue added by James Ralph that attacked the treatment of authors by society, making the beginning of a theatrical relationship between Ralph and Fielding. The publication was advertised in The St. James's Evening Post, the London Evening Post, the Whitehall Evening Post, and the Monthly Chronicle. The edition printed was the only London edition of the play on its own with a Dublin edition printed in 1730. The play was later collected in Arthur Murphy's edition of Fielding's Works (1762).

== Cast ==
The cast according to the printed billing:

- Wilding — played by Mr Giffard
- Pedant — played by Mr. Bullock (William Bullock Jr.)
- Veromil — played by Mr. W. Giffard
- Bellaria — played by Mrs. Purden
- Valentine — played by Mr. Williams
- Clarissa — Played by Mrs. Seal
- Sir Avarice Pedant;— played by Mr Collet
- Lady Gravely — Sister of Sir Avarice, played by Mrs. Haughton
- Lady Lucy Pendant — Wife of Sir Avarice, played by Mrs. Giffard
- Sir Harry Wilding — Father of Wilding, played by Mr. Penkethman (William Penkethman Jr.)
- Pincet — Servant of Wilding, played by Mr. Bardin
- Other characters — a Taylor, a Perriwig-maker, Servants
- Epilogue spoken by Mrs. Giffard
- Singing in Act 2 and Act 3 by Miss Thornowets

== Plot ==
Wilding is a young law student who gives up his studies to seek pleasure. He is a rake who uses people and wishes to marry Bellaria simply for money. Unlike Love in Several Masques, Fielding cares more about revealing hypocrisy than with a discussion of love and lovers, but he portrays the hypocrites in a manner that emphasises a comedic response instead of censure. Other characters want to have Bellaria, including the virtuous man Veromil and his foil Valentine who is unable to control his desires for Bellaria. Valentine eventually pairs with Clarissa, a character of little substance within the play, Veromil marries Bellaria, and Wilding does not marry.

== Themes ==
The play's rejection by the Theatre Royal proved beneficial to Fielding because it allowed him to experiment with his plays in ways that would be unaccepted at larger locations. This is not to say that the play was different from his first; The Temple Beau (1730), like Love in Several Masques (1728), exemplified Fielding's understanding of traditional Post-Restoration comedic form. The connections are deeper, and, as Harold Pagliaro believes, that "Though The Temple Beau is more complex in its intrigues than is Fielding's first play, both promote the ideal of love and marriage, showing money to be necessary for a happy marriage but bad as the primary reason for it."

The Temple Beau is straightforward unlike Love in Several Masques, and it relies on a simpler set of patterns: instead of triplicates, the images are repeated only once. Additionally, many of the characters are analogous to the roles of the characters within the other play (Wilding and Wisemore, Veromil and Merital, Valentine and Malvil, etc.). However, the plot of the two plays are different because Fielding focuses more on hypocrisy and how characters interact with Wilding. Bellaria's two aunts, Lady Pedant and Lady Gravely, representing immodesty and prudishness respectively, try to influence her actions; Bellaria is able to avoid the suggestions of both, and believes that one should not hide their love for another and should be passionate towards a virtuous man. When it comes to matters of gender, the play expresses a view of equality between the sexes that manifests in marriage. However, the play reveals that there are different standards for the genders even though the male characters may express concerns about these double standards.

== Critical response ==
The Temple Beau was one of the best received new plays at Goodman's Fields, with only James Ralph's The Fashionable Lady as a rival. Its initial run lasted for an equal amount of time during April 1730. The Daily Journal reported that the play was well received. On the author's benefit nights, Fielding was able to raise about 100 pounds. There are no direct contemporary reviews on The Temple Beau that have survived. A few plays may have been influenced by The Temple Beau, including Theophilus Cibber's The Lovers (1730) or Benjamin Hoadly's The Suspicious Husband (1747). The play was mostly ignored until John Genest, in Some Account of the English Stage, from the Restoration in 1660 to 1830 (1832), declared the play as better than Fielding's other plays with little explanation as to why. In 1911, Austin Dobson wrote, "The Temple Beau certainly shows an advance upon its predecessor; but it is an advance in the same direction, imitation of Congreve." Leslie Stephen backs this up by saying that the play is "much in the vein of the first, with less smartness in dialogue".

F. Homes Dudden declared The Temple Beau as "a fairly good comedy of intrigue" and says that "The plot of the comedy, though rather too complicated, is more skilfully constructed than that of Love in Several Masques, and some of the situations are diverting. One of the best things in the piece is the interview between the deluded Sir Harry [...] young Wilding [...] and Pincet". Robert Hume believed that "Fielding had begun to master the mechanics of intrigue comedy. The results are not wonderful, but they show distinctly more technical competence. Fielding still employs more characters than he can comfortably control [...] but at least he involves them in related complications." Albert Rivero believed that "The initial rejection of The Temple Beau, however, convinced Fielding that his future success would depend on his ability to satisfy the town's taste for less conventional entertainments." Harold Pagliaro describes the play by saying, "Though the dramatic structure of The Temple Beau is improved over that of Fielding's first play, it has some obvious weaknesses. The lovers are too nearly perfect to engage us in what is or ought to be their burdensome complication of distress. They are so sure of each other and of themselves that they are unassailable, however threatened by the loss of love, freedom and financial self-sufficiency."

== See also ==
The Journal of a Voyage to Lisbon
