= Nicholas Amhurst =

English poet and political writer (1697–1742)

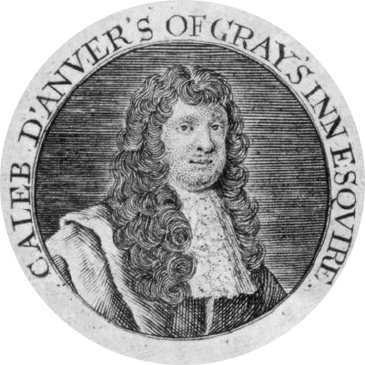
Caleb D'Anvers

Nicholas Amhurst (16 October 1697 – 27 April 1742) was an English poet and political writer.

== Life ==
Amhurst was born at Marden, Kent. He was educated at Merchant Taylors' School, and at St John's College, Oxford. In 1719 he was expelled from the university, ostensibly for his irregularities of conduct, but in reality (according to his own account) because of his whig principles. His politics were sufficiently evident in many of his works: a congratulatory epistle to Addison, in Protestant Popery; or the Convocation (1718), an attack on the opponents of Bishop Benjamin Hoadly; and in The Protestant Session by a member of the Constitution Club at Oxford (1719), addressed to James, first Earl Stanhope, and printed anonymously, but doubtless by Amhurst.

He had satirized Oxford morals in Strepkon's Revenge; a Satire on the Oxford Toasts (1718), and he attacked from time to time the administration of the university and its principal members. An old Oxford custom permitted, on public occasions, some person to deliver from the rostrum a humorous, satirical speech, full of university scandal. This orator was known as Terræ filius. In 1721 Amhurst produced a series of bi-weekly satirical papers under this name, which ran for seven months and incidentally provides much curious information. These publications were reprinted in 1726 in two volumes as Terræ Filius; or, the Secret History of the University of Oxford. He collected his poems in 1720, and wrote another university satire, Oculus Britanniæ, in 1724.

On leaving Oxford for London he became a prominent pamphleteer on the opposition (whig) side. On the 5 December 1726 he issued the first number of The Craftsman, a weekly periodical, which he conducted under the pseudonym of Caleb D'Anvers. The paper was aimed mainly towards the overthrow of Sir Robert Walpole's government; there is some debate about its effects, with most historians agreeing it did little more than preaching to the converted. Nevertheless, it reached a circulation of 10,000 copies and was one of the biggest magazines of its time with authors such as Henry Fielding, John Gay and Alexander Pope contributing to it. For this success Amhurst's editorship was not perhaps chiefly responsible. It was founded, and in the beginning financed, by Henry St John, 1st Viscount Bolingbroke and William Pulteney, the latter being a frequent and caustic contributor. In 1737 an imaginary letter from Colley Cibber was inserted, in which he was made to suggest that many plays by Shakespeare and the older dramatists contained passages which might be regarded as seditious. He therefore desired to be appointed censor of all plays brought on the stage. This was regarded as a "suspected" libel, and a warrant was issued for the arrest of the printer. Amhurst surrendered himself instead, and suffered a short imprisonment. On the overthrow of the government in 1742 the opposition leaders did nothing for the useful editor of the Craftsman, and this neglect is said to have hastened Amhurst's death, which took place, aged 44, at Twickenham.

In the pamphlet The Case of Authors by Profession or Trade, Stated (1758), James Ralph cited Amhurst as a cautionary example of a party writer left unrewarded after the 1742 settlement following Walpole’s fall, calling him "a Drudge of his Party for the best Part of Twenty Years" and claiming he died neglected and was buried at a bookseller’s charity.
