= William Guthrie (historian) =

18th-century Scottish writer and journalist

William Guthrie (1708–1770) was a Scottish writer and journalist, now remembered as a historian.

== Life ==
The son of an Episcopalian clergyman, he was born at Brechin, Forfarshire, in 1708. He was educated at Aberdeen University with a view to becoming a parochial schoolmaster, but he settled in London in 1730, and tried literature.

He was first engaged on parliamentary debates for the Gentleman's Magazine, his reports being revised by Samuel Johnson. He gradually made a reputation as a political writer, and in 1745 received a pension of £200 a year from the Pelham administration. He asked for and was granted a renewal of his pension by the Bute government in 1762.

Guthrie was referred to by Johnson in terms of some respect. He died on 9 March 1770, and was buried in Marylebone.

== Works ==
Guthrie's first scholarly work was a History of England from the Invasion of Julius Cæsar to 1688, 4 vols., Lond. 1744–51; an attempt to base history on parliamentary records. Conceived as part of a coordinated Country-Whig project, it was paired with James Ralph’s post-Revolution sequel, The History of England, During the Reigns of King William, Queen Anne, and King George I, so that Guthrie carried the narrative to 1688 and Ralph treated the ensuing decades.

In 1763 he published a book titled Complete List of the English Peerage. In spite of revision by aristocrats, this work is inaccurate. About 1764–7 he published, along with collaborators, A General History of the World, from the Creation to the Present Time, in twelve volumes; this was favourably noticed in The Critical Review, it was said by the author himself. In 1767 appeared A General History of Scotland in 10 volumes. It is inaccurate, particularly in the early periods.

Probably his most noted book was his Geographical, Historical, and Commercial Grammar (1770), which reached numerous editions, and was translated into French in 1801. Besides translations from Quintilian (1756) and Cicero (1744–54–55–58), he also wrote The Friends, a sentimental novel, in two volumes (1754), and Remarks on English Tragedy (1757).

== Attribution ==
- This article incorporates text from a publication now in the public domain: Bayne, William (1890). "Guthrie, William (1708–1770)". In Stephen, Leslie; Lee, Sidney (eds.). Dictionary of National Biography. Vol. 23. London: Smith, Elder & Co. pp. 383–384.
