= The Champion (1739 periodical) =

London periodical (1739–1742)

'The Champion; or, British Mercury'
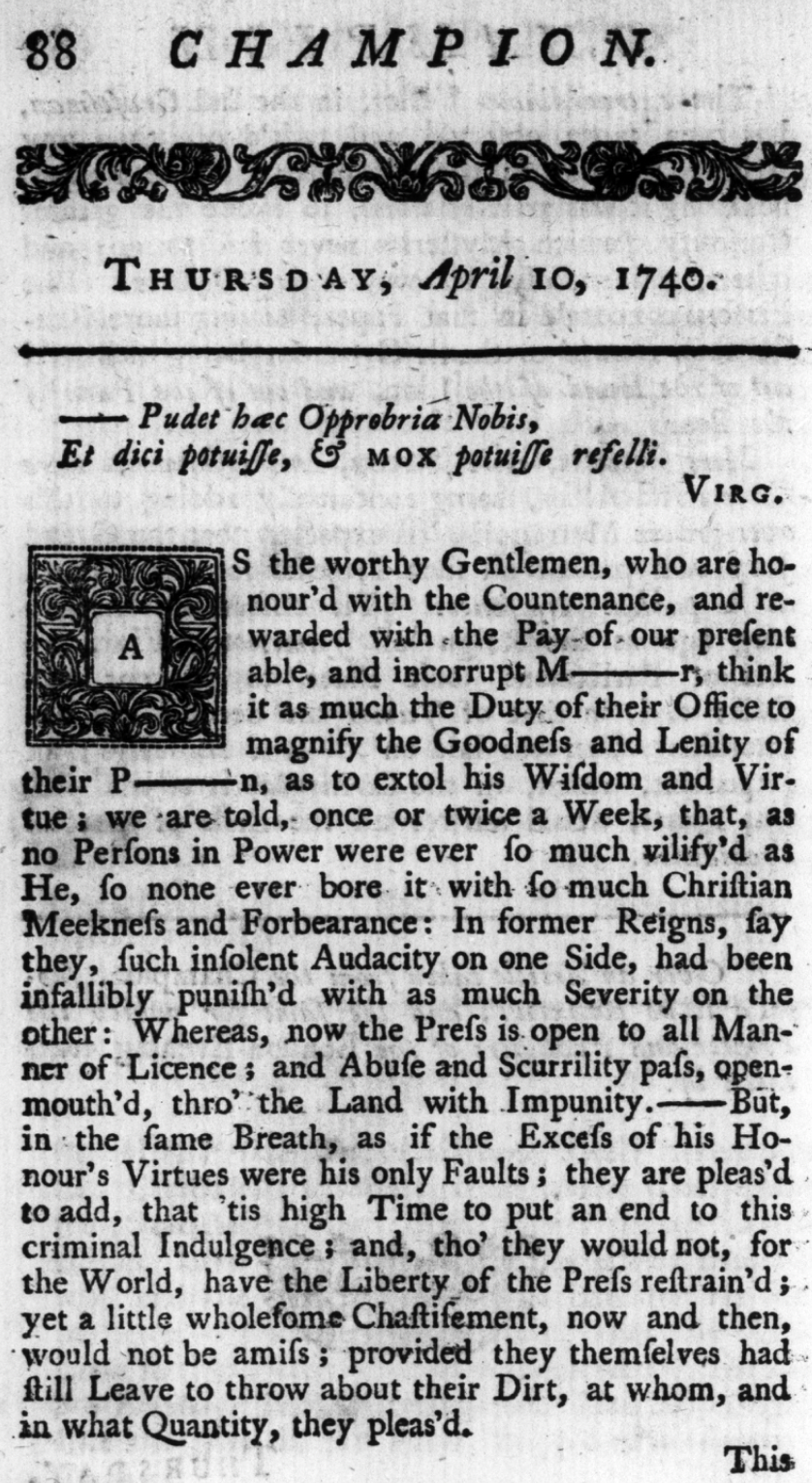
- First page of the 10 April 1740 issue, as reset in the 1743 book-format collected edition The Champion: containing a series of papers…; this is not the original newspaper issue.
- Editor: Henry Fielding (to June 1741); James Ralph (from 1741)
- Categories: Political and literary
- Frequency: Three times a week (Tue, Thu, Sat)
- Publisher: T. Cooper, at the Globe in Paternoster Row
- First issue: 15 November 1739
- Final issue: 31 August 1742 (as Champion; or, Evening Advertiser)
- Country: Kingdom of Great Britain
- Based in: London, England
- Language: English
- Title changes: Champion; or, Evening Advertiser (April 1740–31 August 1742)

The Champion; or, British Mercury was a London periodical published three times a week between 1739 and 1742. Printed for T. Cooper in Paternoster Row, it began on 15 November 1739; from April 1740 it appeared as Champion; or, Evening Advertiser; the series ended on 31 August 1742.

Conceived as a political and literary paper, it was initially written and fronted by Henry Fielding under the persona “Captain Hercules Vinegar”, with James Ralph contributing political columns and, from 1741, serving as editor. Both men had recently left the stage after the Licensing Act 1737 curtailed non-patent theatres. The paper took a Patriot or “country interest” line against Robert Walpole, with regular features such as the “Index to the Times” and “Journal of the War”.

Reporting on Parliament remained constrained, so the paper often used brief or oblique notices while developing broader political commentary. In late 1741 and early 1742 it pressed an isolationist case framed by Hanoverian neutrality and cited the Act of Settlement in arguing limits on British obligations; it also carried essays on imperial strategy, notably a series by George Burrington. After Walpole’s resignation in 1742, the paper coupled arguments for the liberty of the press with close attention to opposition organisation and the circulation of constituency “instructions”. Contemporary observers noted its reach, and later critics have highlighted both its literary criticism and Ralph’s political journalism; historians place the Champion among the successful opposition essay papers of the early 1740s.

Two similarly titled papers circulated independently in 1741 and 1743: British Champion; or, Admiral Vernon’s Weekly Journal and British Champion; or, The Impartial Advertiser.

== Publication and format ==
The paper appeared in London three times a week. The first issue (Thursday, 15 November 1739) announced publication “every Tuesday, Thursday, and Saturday morning” and carried the imprint “Printed for T. Cooper, at the Globe in Pater-noster-Row; where advertisements and letters to the author are taken in.” In the days just before publication, the Daily Post and London Daily Post (12–13 November 1739) billed “the celebrated Capt. HERCULES VINEGAR, of Hockley in the Hole.” The debut issue was offered gratis, a common launch tactic for weeklies. The initial title was The Champion; or, British Mercury.

A consortium of about half a dozen booksellers launched the paper, and internal evidence suggests backing from George Bubb Dodington, John Campbell, 2nd Duke of Argyll, Philip Stanhope, 4th Earl of Chesterfield, George Lyttelton, and John Carteret. As was typical for bookseller-owned papers, the printer managed news and advertisements while the principal author oversaw the essay section. The paper flagged money troubles in December 1739–January 1740 and again in June 1740.

Like other full-priced London titles of the 1740s, the Champion ran under an elaborate engraved headpiece on the first page, with other front-page ornament usually limited to the opening initial. On 10 April 1740 it announced a switch to evening publication and adopted the title Champion; or, Evening Advertiser. In the same issue it complained that the Craftsman had lifted its advertisement and ten news paragraphs verbatim, and it protested obstruction by bookseller-shareholders (a problem also faced by the Englishman's Evening Post). Distribution difficulties persisted: on 5 June 1740 the paper quipped that “Clerks of the Road” would not let the Champion travel by post “for fear, perhaps, it shall quarrel with the Gazetteer upon the Road,” and on 30 October 1740 it lamented that “scarce four Champions in Twelve” reached subscribers. Although the early months as an evening paper were hampered by circulation problems, adopting the evening-post format laid the ground for later commercial success.

Early runs were gathered in collected volumes as The Champion: containing a series of papers, humorous, moral, political and critical. The book-format title page does not reproduce the newspaper’s “or, British Mercury” or later “or, Evening Advertiser” clauses. The run ended on 31 August 1742. Two similarly titled papers circulated independently: British Champion; or, Admiral Vernon’s Weekly Journal (advertised 12 October 1741) and British Champion; or, The Impartial Advertiser (18 August–15 September 1743). Contemporary catalogues name no editor for the 1743 title; by early 1743 James Ralph had shifted to Old England; or, The Constitutional Journal. A 1743 printer’s petition also lists an unstamped sheet styled Champion or, London Evening Advertiser; surviving sources do not establish any link between that sheet and the series.

== History ==
At launch, playwright Henry Fielding (as “Captain Hercules Vinegar”) served as principal editor, and his former theatrical collaborator and assistant James Ralph soon took charge of the news-opinion columns “Index to the Times” and “Journal of the War.” Both men had been forced out of the theatre by the Licensing Act 1737, which required pre-approval of plays and confined legitimate performance to the patent houses.

The Hercules Vinegar persona appeared at once: the first issue introduced a swaggering “Captain” who laid aside the sword for the pen; two days later he styled himself “of Hockley in the Hole.” The byname echoed an earlier prize-fighting persona associated with London’s bear-garden amphitheatres. Readers quickly heckled the imposture—letters from “A. Moore … near St. Paul’s” and “Paul Serious” (4 December 1739) mocked both title and pseudonym—prompting an editorial reply that dating from Hockley placated the “beautiful Goddess of Envy” and hinted at “deeper Reasons.” A week later the persona moved in print: a letter headed “From my Dining Room in Pall-Mall, Dec. 10th, being the first Night of my Arrival from Hockley in the Hole” signalled the shift, and the same day the paper offered an ironical defence of the Licensing Act 1737—the statute that had curtailed Fielding’s and Ralph’s stage careers—with barbs at Colley and Theophilus Cibber. On 13 December the “Captain” claimed the play-house as his province and lampooned a crude stage-makeup trick on a mimic “Caesar’s brow.”

January 1740 kept the thread alive with a few telling moments: an “odd slip” on 5 January, a note signed “Hercules Vinegar” but misaddressed to “Mr. Champion”; on 10 January, a letter that pretended to attack “Vinegar” but was really a hit at Walpole—flagged by a brief end-note signed “**,” which was Ralph’s mark for the political target; on 15 January, an essay noting that pieces “from Hockley in the Hole” were discounted until the move to a more “polite Part of the Town”; and, on 26 January, a letter jeering at “Capt. Vinegar” preaching virtue. After late January the fiction was only lightly sustained—apart from two spring flashes—“the Captain” receded and most papers ignored his individuality.

Spring 1740 revived the bear-garden theme: on 25 March the paper carried an invitation to the amphitheatres for a bout at broad-sword and quarter-staff, and on 1 April it printed a letter from “Vander Bruin” urging “gymnastic Encounters” and announcing two “Brother Bears” for baiting—a piece also read as political satire. On 3 April the paper ran “An Essay on Truth,” arguing against rhyme in serious poetry. Thereafter the dramatic thread thinned: Gray noted the “Captain” returned to the theatre only “once in a great while.”

By early September 1740 a reader letter (6 September) asked for regular theatre coverage; the next issue reviewed Milward’s Hamlet and discussed Drury Lane’s management passing to Quin, and on 16 September correspondents’ replies were printed.

While Fielding carried the essay-moral pieces, politics were largely Ralph’s brief. He ran the “Index to the Times” and “Journal of the War,” cataloguing the War of Jenkins' Ear, naval shortcomings, and parliamentary corruption in a “crisp [and] provocative” tone. Early political essays in this phase also mapped elements of the “constitution” and warned against faction, with one dubbing Walpole “Traitor-Achitophel” and another urging popular leverage—“the weight of England is in the people.”

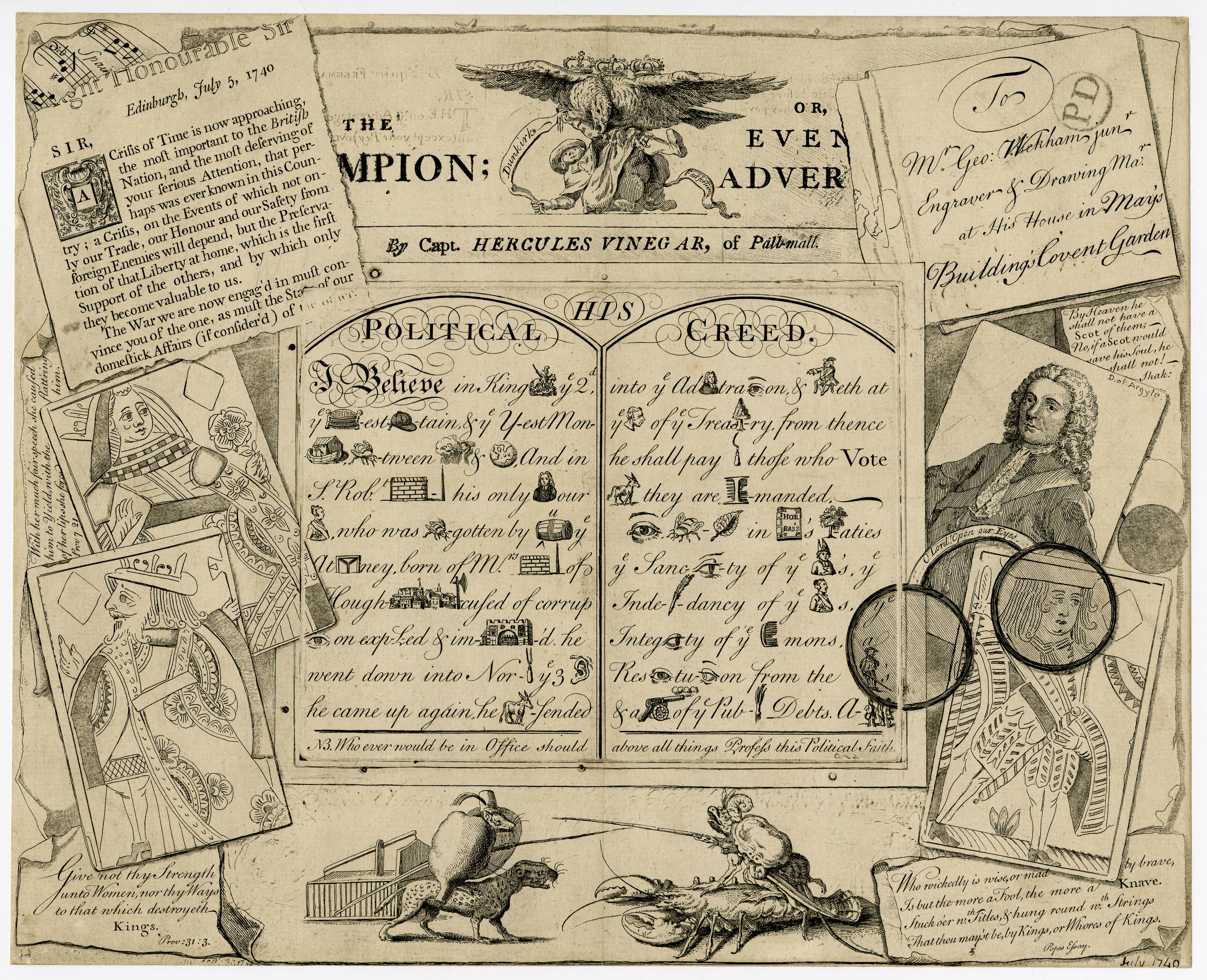
Engraving (1740) by George Bickham the Younger advertising Champion; or, Evening Advertiser. British Museum, inv. 1868,0808.3630.

Meanwhile the political line hardened: on 29 May 1740 the paper printed “the heads of the dealings of the last Parliament,” promising the “material Merit of both Parties” at a glance, and in late May–early June it ran an anti-corruption cartoon that was reprinted, boosting notoriety. In this phase the Champion worked chiefly as an opposition Whig journal and, like peer essay papers, preferred “patriot”/“country interest” language over Whig–Tory labels; despite the prosecutions of 1737, no London newspaper—including the Champion—was prosecuted in Walpole’s last two years.

Fielding stepped down in June 1741—friction typical of group-managed, bookseller-owned papers “seem[ing] to have accounted” for his departure; Ralph was named editor, and Fielding’s two-sixteenths share was reassigned to him. By then Fielding had already entered prose fiction with the anonymous parody Shamela (1741). Fielding later sketched the collaboration in a dream-vision: a coach packed with party leaders drawn not by horses but by two half-starved donkeys, “Vinegar” and “Ralph,” driven hard with the whip and given nothing for their pains. The drivers repeatedly called on “Vinegar” to pull harder despite his shabby condition, while “Ralph,” yoked beside him, strained and brayed as if unfed since the winter frosts.

After Fielding’s departure, theatrical comment surfaced only occasionally—for example, a letter titled “Character of Mr. Garrick” in October 1742, reprinted that month in the Gentleman's Magazine.

Under Ralph, the paper’s profile expanded even as parliamentary reporting remained restricted: while Parliament was sitting, rules of privilege confined coverage to brief, often deliberately elliptical items. On 12 December 1741 it noted that “the Disputes of the famous Political Club” continued past one in the morning, and by the end of that month even the ministerial Daily Gazetteer reported that the Champion was “greatly in demand in the city.” The paper also gave space to colonial–commercial strategy: in a series by George Burrington (former governor of North Carolina) it urged using naval power against the springs of French trade and empire (24 October, 3 November 1741; 30 January, 4 and 11 February 1742).

In late 1741–early 1742 the editorial line sharpened into an isolationist critique framed by Hanoverian neutrality. On 26 December 1741 the paper linked Admiral Haddock’s inaction against the Toulon fleet to Hanoverian constraints; on 19 January 1742 it invoked the Act of Settlement clause that Britain need not defend territories not belonging to the English crown “without the consent of Parliament,” arguing abuse of the proviso and rejecting claims that Hanover’s vulnerability should limit British operations; the same issue urged applying “the Remainder of our wealth, strength, and vigour” to self-preservation and contended that support for Austria had already cost too much, aligning with the isolationist case advanced in The Plain Truth (1742), probably by Ralph. Across the opposition press that winter, positions diverged—an isolationist case in the Champion versus conditional intervention in the Craftsman—and the essay papers then fell largely quiet on war questions between Walpole’s fall and late 1742.

After Walpole’s resignation, the paper coupled a defence of press liberty with close attention to opposition organisation. On 6 March 1742 it warned that liberty of the press would not have been preserved had he remained in power, alleging that a bill had been prepared to subject printing to a licenser on the model of the 1737 stage restraints. Between March and July it tracked manoeuvring—on 13 March reporting a meeting of about 200 opposition MPs at the Fountain Tavern (held 12 March), and on 1 July likening the Commons’ refusal to authorise printing the secret committee’s report to a “hopeful Babe … STRANGLED in the BIRTH” at a “GREAT HOUSE at Westminster.” It also helped circulate constituency “instructions” to MPs, printing them alongside the Craftsman, London Evening Post, Daily Post, and Universal Spectator, with the monthly magazines reprinting them and MPs’ letters of thanks. On 19 August 1742 it revisited its parliamentary survey with another heads-style summary; the run ended weeks later on 31 August 1742.

== Reception ==
Contemporaries noted both the paper’s reach and its knack for provocation. By late 1741 a ministerial daily reported it was “greatly in demand in the city”; earlier, an anti-corruption cartoon it printed was reprinted elsewhere, drawing further notice; and a pro-government paper dismissed the Champion (with the Englishman's Evening Post) as “mushroom writers.”

Later assessments have credited both its criticism and its political journalism. The literary historian Walter James Graham judged that the Champion “contained criticism of real value” and “added not unworthily to the beginnings of criticism,” while the historian Robert W. Kenny singled out James Ralph’s “crisp and provocative” handling of the “Index to the Times” and “Journal of the War.” The historian of eighteenth-century Britain Jeremy Black likewise groups the paper with the successful opposition essay journals of the early 1740s.

== Sources ==
- Adam Matthew Digital (2025). "The Champion: containing a series of papers, humorous, moral, political and critical: volume 1". Eighteenth Century Journals. Harry Ransom Center, University of Texas at Austin.
- Black, Jeremy (2001). The English Press 1621–1861. Stroud: Sutton. ISBN 978-0-7509-2524-2.
- Castro-Santana, Anaclara (18 August 2015). "Sham Marriages and Proper Plots: Henry Fielding's Shamela and Joseph Andrews". English Studies. 96 (6): 636–653. doi:10.1080/0013838X.2015.1045728. S2CID 163073219.
- Cengage (2025). "Early English Newspapers—Title List (microfilm): "Champion: or Evening Advertiser" (with title history for "Champion: or British Mercury")" (PDF). Cengage.
- Crane, Ronald S.; Kaye, F. B. (1927). "A Census of British Newspapers and Periodicals, 1620–1800". Studies in Philology. 24. Chapel Hill, NC: University of North Carolina Press. JSTOR 4171968.
- Graham, Walter (1930). English Literary Periodicals. New York: Thomas Nelson and Sons. OCLC 2307811.
- Gray, Charles Harold (1931). Theatrical Criticism in London to 1795 (PDF). Columbia University Studies in English and Comparative Literature. New York: Columbia University Press. OCLC 2538447.
- Harris, Michael (1987). London Newspapers in the Age of Walpole: A Study of the Origins of the Modern English Press. Rutherford, NJ: Fairleigh Dickinson University Press; Associated University Presses. ISBN 978-0-8386-3273-4.
- Harris, Robert (1993). A Patriot Press: National Politics and the London Press in the 1740s. Oxford: Oxford University Press.
- Hughes, Helen Sand (1922). "Fielding's Indebtedness to James Ralph". Modern Philology. 20 (1): 19–29. doi:10.1086/387429. JSTOR 433329.
- Kenny, Robert W. (1940). "James Ralph: An Eighteenth-Century Philadelphian in Grub Street". The Pennsylvania Magazine of History and Biography. 64 (2): 218–242. JSTOR 20087279.
- Mari, William Thomas (2015). "Writer by Trade: James Ralph's Claims to Authorship". Authorship. 4 (2). doi:10.21825/aj.v4i2.1439.
- McKinsey, Elizabeth R. (1973). "James Ralph: The Professional Writer Comes of Age". Proceedings of the American Philosophical Society. 117 (1): 59–78. JSTOR 985948.
- McMaster University Libraries (2025). "Eighteenth Century Journals collection (entry: Champion)". McMaster University Library.
- Okie, Laird (1991). Augustan Historical Writing: Historiography in England, 1688–1750. Lanham, MD: University Press of America.
- Stanford University Libraries (2025). "The Champion; or, British mercury. [electronic resource]: By Capt. Hercules Vinegar, of Pall-Mall". SearchWorks.
- Wells, John Edwin (1913). "Fielding's "Champion" and Captain Hercules Vinegar". The Modern Language Review. 8 (2): 165–172. doi:10.2307/3713103. JSTOR 3713103.
