= The Critical Review (newspaper) =

British publication (1756–1817)

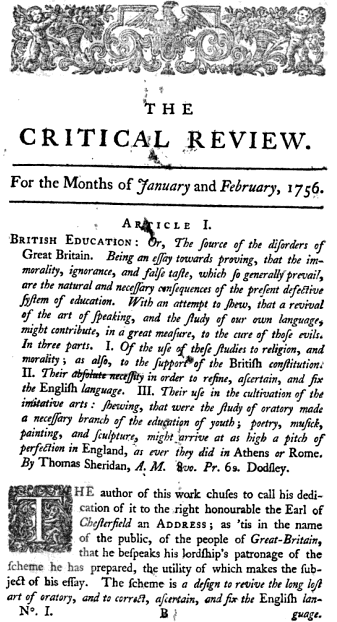
The Critical Review, no. 1, 1756

The Critical Review was a British publication appearing from 1756 to 1817. It was first edited by Tobias Smollett, from 1756 to 1763. Contributors included Samuel Johnson, David Hume, John Hunter, and Oliver Goldsmith.

== Early years ==
The Edinburgh printer Archibald Hamilton started publishing The Critical Review in 1756 with Tobias Smollett as its first editor. The content was mainly book reviews, which were often long and favourable, with copious verbatim quotations. The Tory and High Church perspectives of contributors came through clearly, however. Besides Smollett, the writers of the first two volumes have been identified as John Armstrong, Samuel Derrick, Thomas Francklin, and Patrick Murdoch.

In 1758, the periodical reviewed James Ralph’s pamphlet The Case of Authors, describing it as a just appraisal of the difficulties facing professional authors.

After a libel against Admiral Sir Charles Knowles in the Review, Smollett was sentenced to a fine of £100 and three months in King's Bench Prison. In 1763 he retired from the Review, but left it as an influential publication.
