= John Genest =

18th/19th-century English clergyman and theatre historian

John Genest (1764–1839) was an English clergyman and theatre historian.

== Life ==
He was the son of John Genest of Dunker's Hill, Devon. He was educated at Westminster School, entered 9 May 1780 as a pensioner at Trinity College, Cambridge, and graduated B.A. 1784 and M.A. 1787. He took holy orders, and was for many years curate of a Lincolnshire village. Subsequently, he became private chaplain to the Duke of Ancaster.

Compelled by ill-health to retire, he went to Bath, Somerset for the benefit of the waters. Here he appears to have remained until his death, which took place, after nine years of illness, at his residence in Henry Street, 15 December 1839. He was buried in St. James's Church.

== Works ==
During his time in Bath he wrote Some Account of the English Stage from the Restoration in 1660 to 1830, Bath, 10 vols. 1832. It is accurate and well-researched.

== Notes ==
Attribution

This article incorporates text from a publication now in the public domain: "Genest, John". Dictionary of National Biography. London: Smith, Elder & Co. 1885–1900.
