= James Ralph =

English political writer and historian (1705-1762)

- Born: c. 1705; London, England
- Died: 24 January 1762; Chiswick, Middlesex, England
- Occupations: Political journalist, historian, poet, essayist
- Writing career
- Language: English
- Period: 1720s–1762
- Genres: Journalism, political commentary, history, poetry
- Notable works: Night (1728) – poetic work mocked in Pope’s Dunciad; Sawney (1728) – satirical defense of Grub Street writers; A History of England (1744–46) – 2-volume historical counter to Whig narratives; The Case of Authors by Profession (1758) – analysis of literary economics
- Movement: Grub Street

James Ralph (c. 1705 – 24 January 1762) was a British political journalist, historian, and periodical essayist. A companion of Benjamin Franklin in the 1720s, he later worked in Grub Street and was singled out by Alexander Pope in The Dunciad. His writings ranged across poetry, stage adaptations, pamphlets, cultural criticism, and large-scale history.

Ralph wrote for and edited several opposition weeklies, including The Champion (editor, 1741–1743), Old England (co-editor, 1743–1744), and The Remembrancer (founder and editor, 1747–1749). He also reported parliamentary debates for the Universal Spectator and contributed to other London papers. Much of his journalism was undertaken with the patronage of George Bubb Dodington and, in the late 1740s, the circle of Frederick, Prince of Wales.

His books include A History of England during the Reigns of William III, Anne, and George I (1744–46), the constitutional survey The Use and Abuse of Parliaments (1744), and the anonymous The Case of Authors by Profession (1758), an analysis of the economics of authorship. Earlier works include The Touch-Stone (1728), a satirical survey of London entertainments; later scholarship has also attributed to him A Critical Review of the Publick Buildings, Statues and Ornaments in and about London and Westminster (1734).

In 1753 Ralph accepted a government pension on the understanding that he would withdraw from active pamphleteering. He returned briefly with The Case of the Late Resignation (1761) and died at Chiswick on 24 January 1762. Contemporary opinion often derided his poetry, but his histories retained readers into the nineteenth century, and modern scholars emphasize his prominence as a mid-eighteenth-century political journalist and commentator on authorship and the book trade.

== Life and career ==
=== Early life and friendship with Benjamin Franklin ===
Ralph’s place of birth has been disputed: older reference works said Pennsylvania or New Jersey, but later research argues for London c. 1705. (Note: For the correction see and . Older sources giving Pennsylvania include and .) By 1723 he was working as a clerk and had joined a small intellectual group that met at Jonathan Read’s coffee house in Philadelphia, including printer Benjamin Franklin, Joseph Watson, and Charles Osborne. Franklin described Ralph as “ingenious, genteel in his manners, and extremely eloquent; I think I never knew a prettier talker.” The two became close companions, sharing literary aspirations and philosophical discussions.

On Guy Fawkes Day (5 November) 1724, Ralph sailed to England with Franklin aboard the London Hope. Franklin later wrote that Ralph was married and had left behind a wife and child in Philadelphia. By 1732, it was reported that his wife was employed as a schoolteacher in Philadelphia.

=== With Franklin in London ===
After arriving in London in December 1724, Franklin found work at Samuel Palmer’s printing house, while Ralph pursued literary and theatrical opportunities. He sought admission to Drury Lane under Robert Wilks, proposed a weekly modeled on The Spectator to the publisher James Roberts, and applied to legal offices in the Temple for clerical work—all without success.

During this time, Ralph relied heavily on Franklin for financial support. Franklin later estimated that he had lent Ralph nearly twenty-seven pounds. Ralph briefly worked as a schoolmaster near Reading, Berkshire, reportedly using Franklin’s name to avoid embarrassment.

Around this period, Franklin printed his early philosophical tract, A Dissertation on Liberty and Necessity, Pleasure and Pain, dedicating it to “J. R.”, likely Ralph. Hoping to discourage Ralph’s poetic ambitions, Franklin also sent him an excerpt from Edward Young’s Love of Fame as a cautionary example.

Ralph developed a relationship with a young milliner, who followed him to Newbury. Franklin’s interactions with her caused tension, eventually ending their friendship. Ralph refused to repay the money borrowed from Franklin, who later expressed regret over the entire arrangement.

In financial distress, Ralph wrote to local clergymen and patrons for assistance, describing the milliner as his wife and requesting further loans. Franklin returned to America in July 1726, but Ralph remained in England and began building a literary career.

Reflecting on their time in London together, Franklin wrote:

“I lov’d him, notwithstanding, for he had many amiable qualities. I had by no means improv’d my fortune; but I had picked up some very ingenious acquaintance, whose conversation was of great advantage to me.”

=== Poetry and the Pope–Ralph quarrel ===
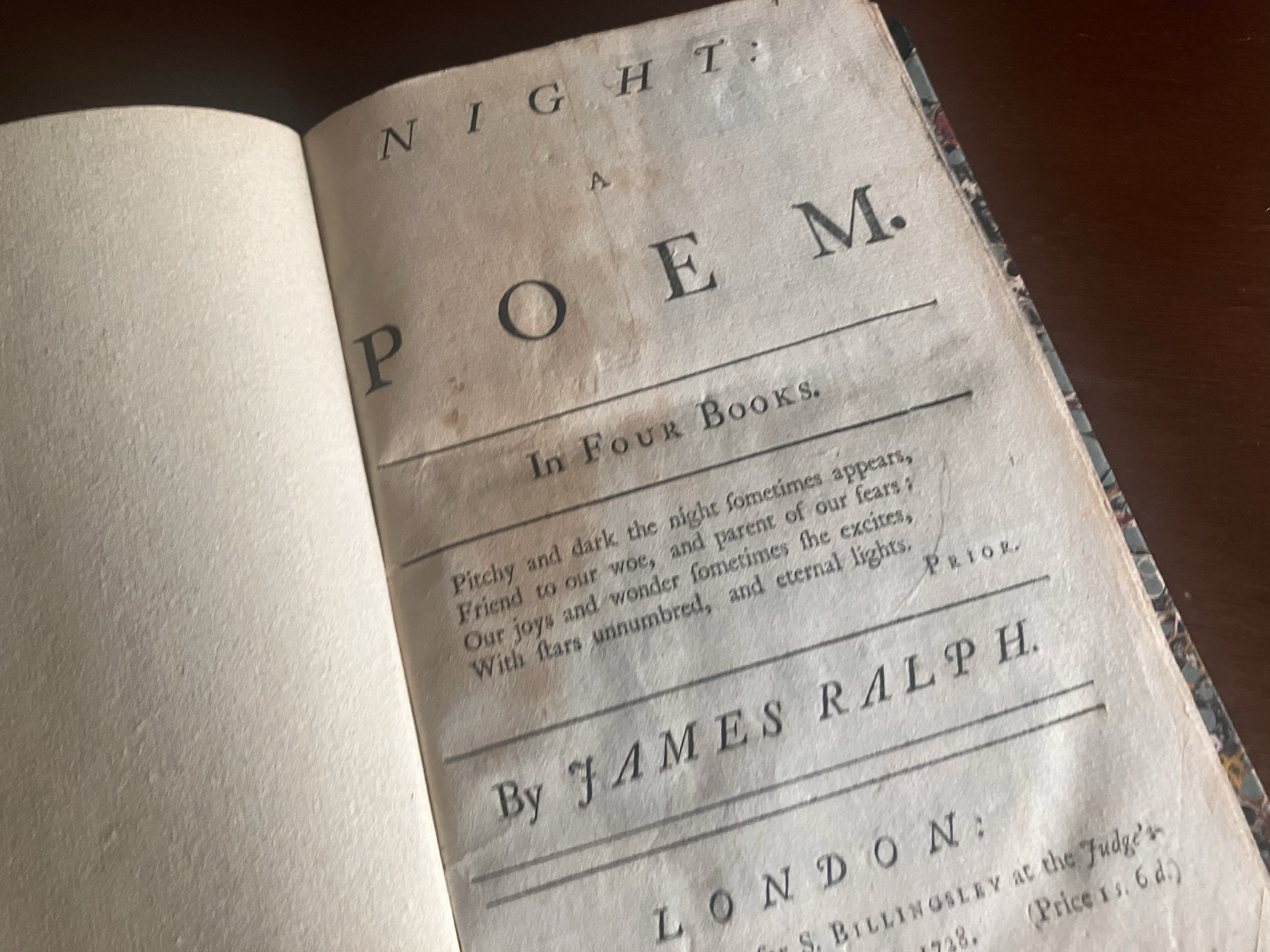
Title page of James Ralph’s Night (1728), photo by Chris Garrigues from his personal copy.

Following Franklin’s departure, Ralph began publishing blank-verse poetry. Influenced by James Thomson’s Winter, he issued The Tempest in 1727, a 27-page poem dedicated to Robert Walpole, and followed with Night, a Poem in Four Books (1728). He arranged distribution through Cornhill bookseller Robert Meadows and sought support from the dissenting minister Strickland Gough. Despite criticism of his “loose pindarick” manner, he defended blank verse for its expressive range, urging reviewers to “compare [it] with Nature … before ’tis declared unworthy of the Muse.”

Still facing financial strain, Ralph promoted Night energetically and courted patrons such as Dr Edmund Calamy and Lord Townshend; excerpts and subscription news appeared in the British Journal in June 1727.

The quarrel was personal in print: in May 1728 Alexander Pope anonymously issued the first three-book version of The Dunciad, a broad attack on Grub Street poets and critics; on 26 June Ralph—who had not been included in the 1728 poem—replied with Sawney: an Heroic Poem. Occasion’d by the Dunciad, an anonymous blank-verse satire defending Grub Street writers and lampooning Pope as “Sawney.” Pope subsequently added Ralph to Book III of the 1729 Dunciad Variorum, mocking him by name:

“Silence, ye wolves! while Ralph to Cynthia howls,
And makes Night hideous—answer him, ye owls.”

— Alexander Pope (1729),

The skirmish cost Ralph dearly: he became the laughing-stock of Grub Street, and he later complained that he was in danger of starving when booksellers lost confidence in his capacity.

In 1729 he issued Miscellaneous Poems, by Several Hands, opening with a second edition of Night and reprinting earlier pieces such as Zeuma and Clarinda; despite advertising, it reportedly sold poorly. A prospectus promised further Spenserian pieces—Temperance, Myror, and two cantos of The Faerie Queene—but none appeared.

McKinsey argues that the weak reception of Ralph’s early poems led him to satire, and that the Dunciad quarrel “proved a roadblock to further poetic possibilities.” Okie likewise writes that Pope’s attack “seems to have destroyed” Ralph’s prospects as a poet; he then tried drama and criticism and, soon after, moved into cultural journalism.

=== Satire, stage, and cultural journalism ===
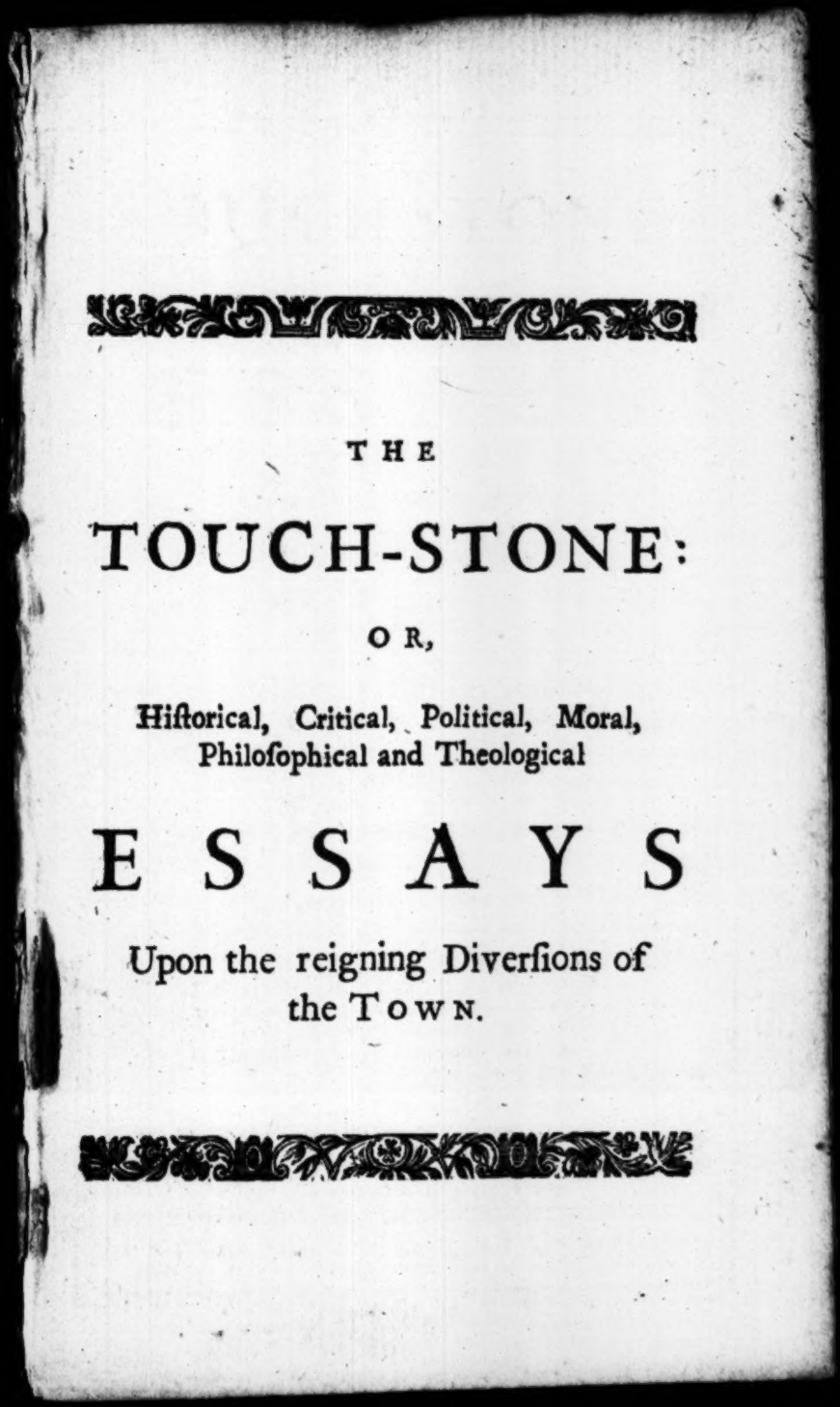
Title page of The Touch-Stone (1729), an anonymously published satirical pamphlet attributed to James Ralph.

After the poor reception of Night and the backlash to Sawney, Ralph shifted from verse to topical satire—first in pamphlets and then on the stage. Helen Sand Hughes proposes that he may have travelled on the Continent, particularly in Holland. In 1728 he anonymously published The Touch-Stone, a satirical survey of London entertainments that has been credited with helping to shape Henry Fielding’s early burlesques, especially The Author’s Farce and Tom Thumb. Ralph and Fielding soon became friends: Ralph wrote the prologue to The Temple Beau (performed 2 February 1730), defending “Authors, like other men, who must live by Wit.”

In April 1730, Ralph’s ballad opera The Fashionable Lady premiered at Goodman's Fields. It ran for nine nights and was revived during the summer. Styled after The Beggar’s Opera, it satirized the English stage, its managers, and the popularity of Italian opera. According to historian John Genest, the play was “not badly written.”

Ralph’s later stage works included The Fall of the Earl of Essex (1731), an adaptation of John Banks’s The Unhappy Favourite, and The Cornish Squire (1734), based on Squire Trelooby.

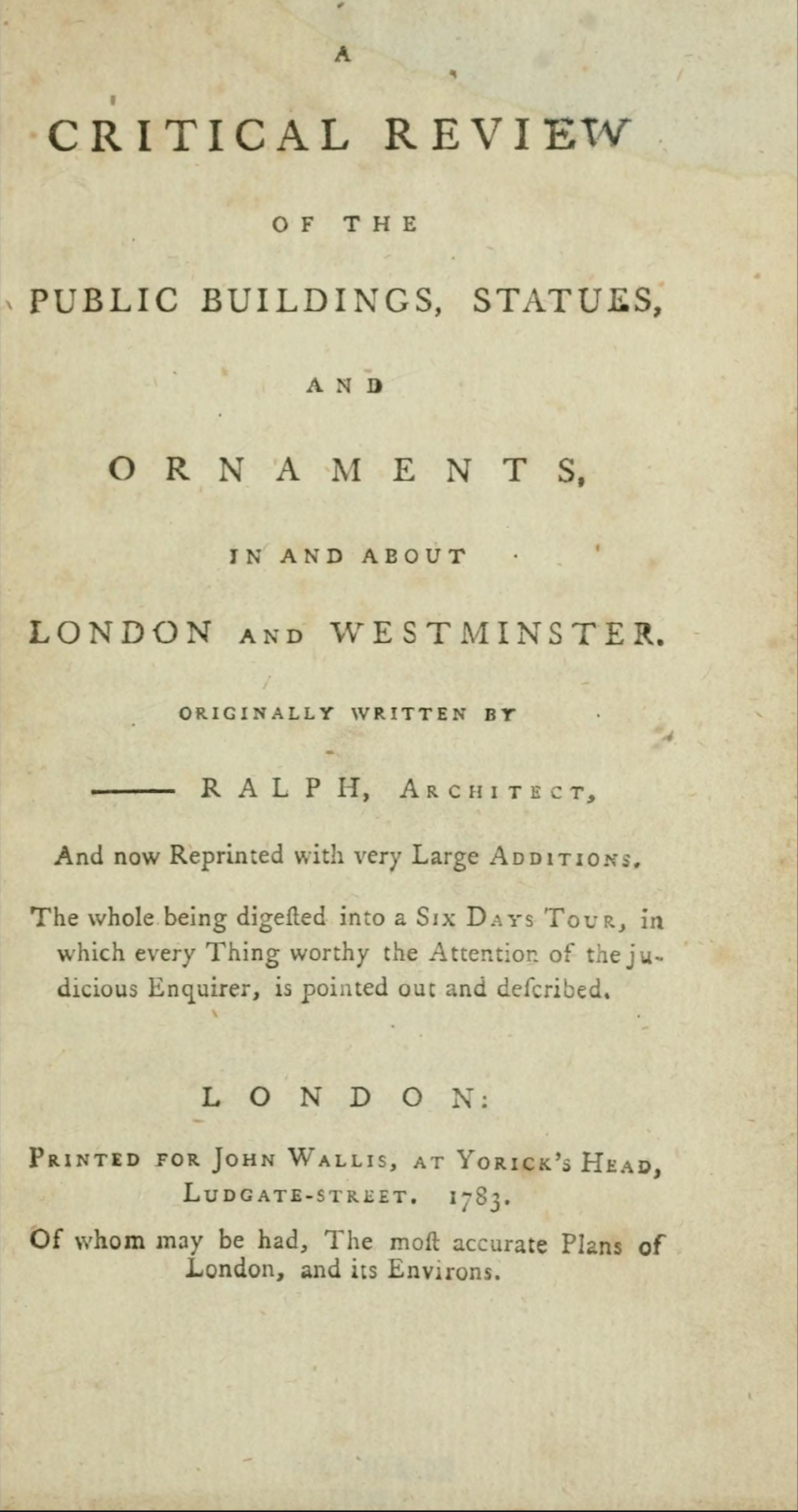
Title page of A Critical Review of the Publick Buildings, Statues and Ornaments in and about London and Westminster (1783 ed.), attributed to James Ralph.

Concurrently with his stage work, Ralph became active in the London press. By early 1731 he was writing leaders for The Weekly Register and The Daily Courant, and had become a principal writer at the Register. In 1734 he expanded a serialised Weekly Register series into A Critical Review of the Publick Buildings, Statues and Ornaments in and about London and Westminster. Appearing soon after the Dunciad Variorum, the Review has been read as an effort to recover standing by courting elite endorsement through its dedication to Lord Burlington. Its combative tone, however, kept him a target for Grub-Street rivals, provoking attacks and replies in the Grub-Street Journal, the Weekly Miscellany, and the Universal Spectator.

Between 1731 and 1737, London theatres have been described as partisan forums. Playwrights such as Ralph and Fielding—excluded from Sir Robert Walpole’s patronage—used burlesque and satire to criticise the ministry; prologues and epilogues often served as party broadsides, and managers viewed the major playhouses as venues for shaping public opinion. Ralph’s The Fall of the Earl of Essex was read as an allusion to Walpole, while Fielding’s The Author’s Farce, Tom Thumb, and Pasquin carried the attack further.

=== Political journalism and patronage ===
The Licensing Act 1737 curtailed Ralph's stage work and hastened his shift to full-time journalism. He filed parliamentary reports for the anti-ministerial Universal Spectator (1737–39), and wrote for The Champion, launched by Henry Fielding in November 1739; when Fielding withdrew in June 1741, Ralph succeeded him as editor and remained in charge until 1743. He also contributed to the Chesterfield-backed Common Sense (c. 1738–43), using these outlets to criticise ministerial corruption and the conduct of the War of Jenkins’ Ear.

By 1739 Ralph had secured the patronage of George Bubb Dodington.

In late 1741 he was probably the author of The Plain Truth: or, A Dialogue between Sir Courtly Jobber … and Tom Tell-Truth, attacking the “patriot” stance of Carteret and Pulteney and arguing against further continental commitments; on 19 January 1742 The Champion advanced the same case for conserving British resources over Austrian support. He continued pamphleteering, replying to the Duchess of Marlborough’s memoirs with The Other Side of the Question (1742), and in 1743 issued A Critical History of the Administration of Sir Robert Walpole. Opposition tracts often summarised debates at a session’s end, and his 1743 history belongs to this mode. He has also been linked to the patriot pamphlet A Defence of the People (1743), often attributed to Ralph and the Earl of Chesterfield, which denied the persistence of a distinct Tory interest.

With Dodington’s backing and Lord Chesterfield’s support, Ralph and William Guthrie launched the opposition weekly Old England, or the Constitutional Journal in 1743; Ralph left the paper in late 1744 after a ministerial pension was arranged. In the same year Ralph and Guthrie planned a multi-volume “Country-Whig” history of Britain, with Ralph to cover the early Hanoverian period. After Dodington entered the Broad Bottom ministry in 1744, Ralph became his private secretary on a pension of about £200 per year.

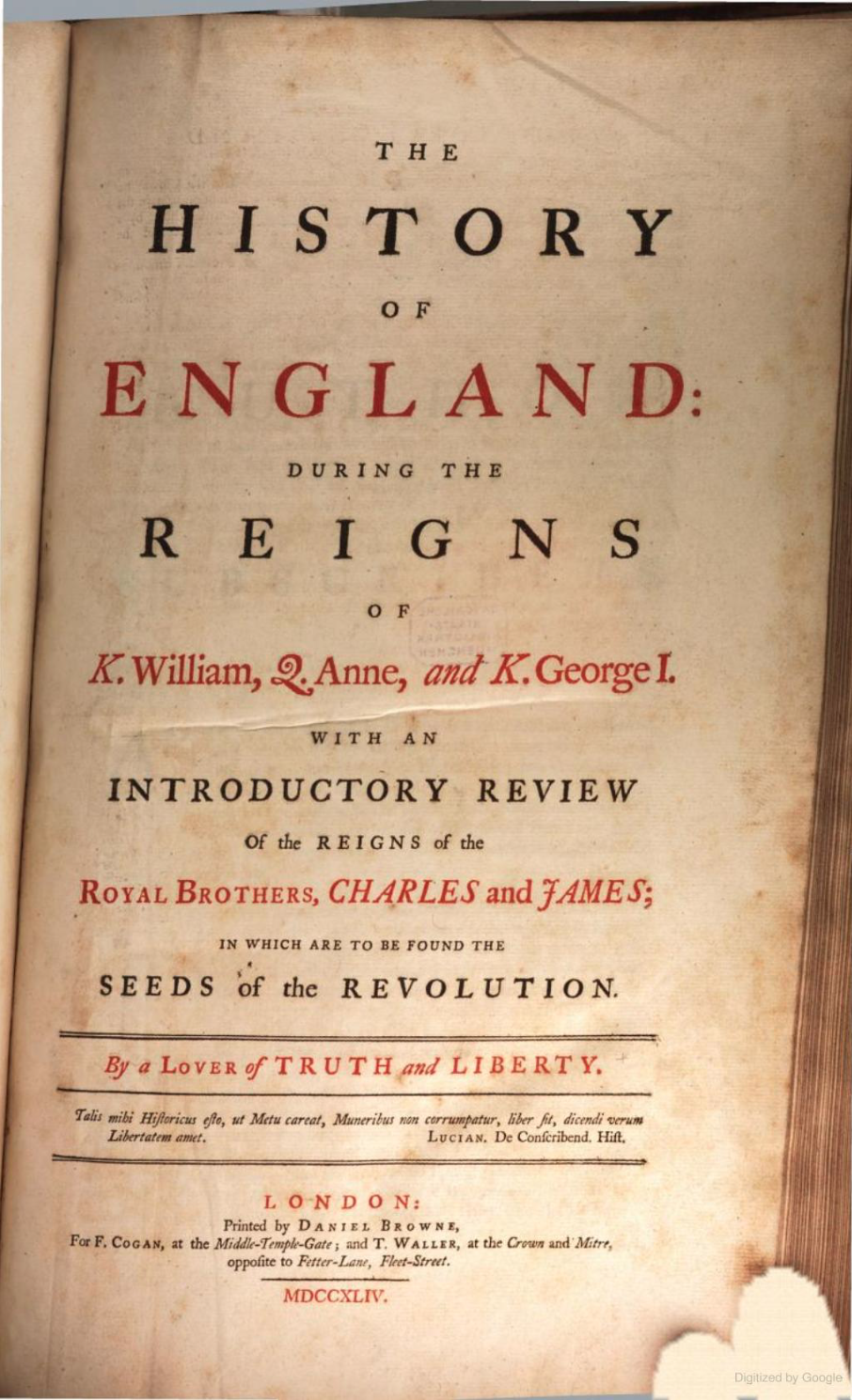
Title Page of James Ralph's History of England, Part I

Between 1744 and 1746 Ralph issued his two-volume History of England during the Reigns of William III, Anne, and George I, his largest historical project. In the same period he published The Use and Abuse of Parliaments, expanding an essay by Algernon Sidney into a two-volume constitutional survey that echoed Bolingbroke’s warning against ministries acting “by means repugnant to the constitution.”

In late 1747 Ralph left Dodington’s service for Prince Frederick’s Leicester House opposition, where he launched The Remembrancer as editor and principal writer, apparently forgoing the pension granted in 1744; the paper took a “patriot” line above party, urging in 1748 “a general confederacy of all parties and Factions” and repeatedly invoking Charles Davenant as “the oracle of this country.” Over the winter of 1747–48 he acted as intermediary to align Dodington with the Leicester House opposition; under the informal understandings that followed, Dodington expected a secretaryship of state in a future Frederick administration, with Ralph to serve as his secretary. On 11 May 1749 he was detained for allegedly publishing a report of a parliamentary debate, then released without charge.

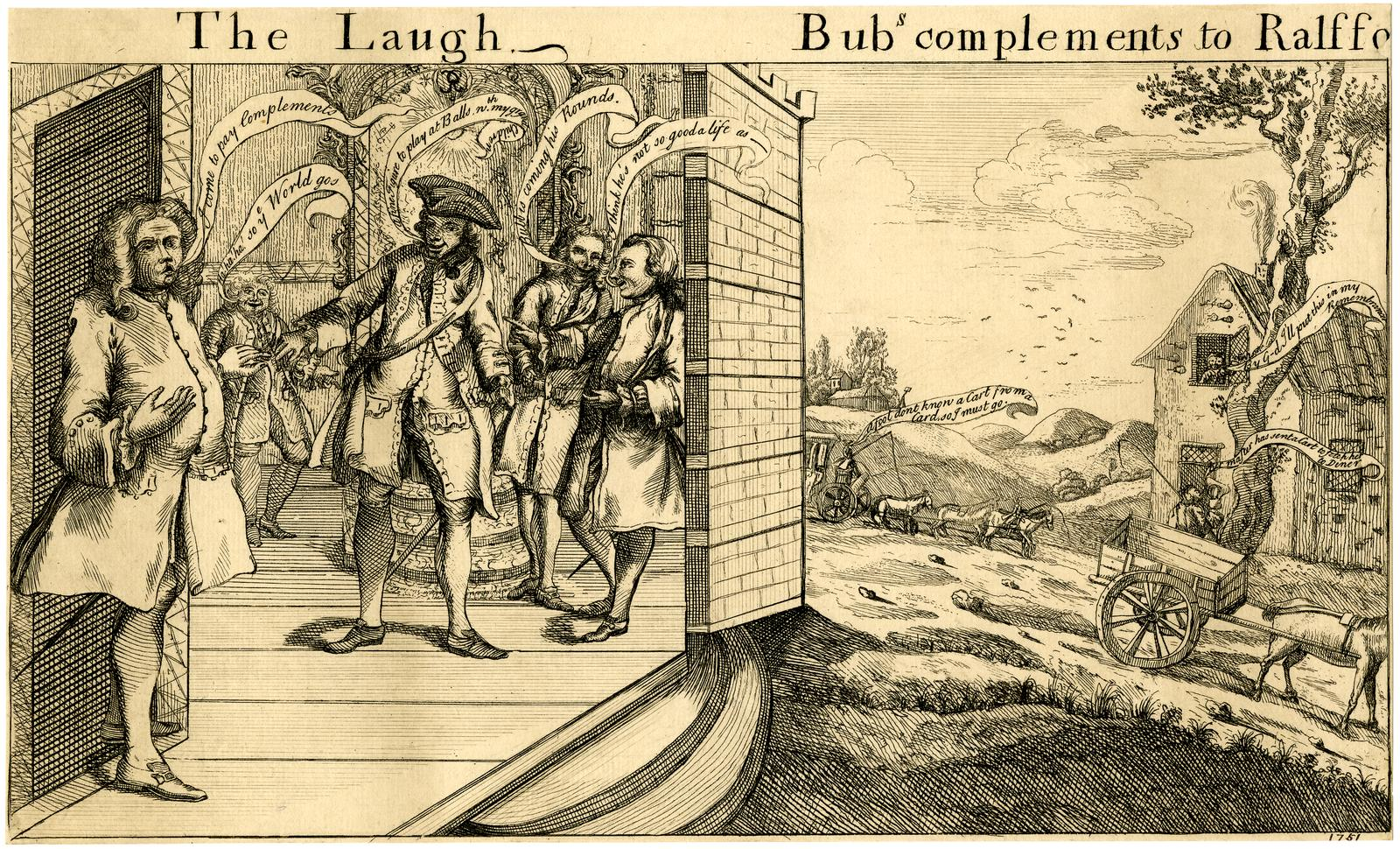
Anonymous satire, The Laugh; or, Bub’s complements to Ralffo (c. 1751), lampooning George Bubb Dodington and James Ralph; Ralph’s speech balloon names The Remembrancer.

After Frederick’s death in March 1751 the Leicester House opposition collapsed. Dodington soon reconciled with the Pelhams and, after a short interval, was readmitted to the outer councils of government, while Henry Pelham declined any accommodation for Ralph. Ralph wrote that he had forfeited part of his pension on entering the prince’s service, had lost £100 to a bankrupt bookseller, and that the prince died owing him £65: “My brain, such as it is, is my whole estate.” He hoped friends would assist him “till I could again be useful.”

By mid-1753 he re-emerged with The Protester, a short-lived Bedford-Whig weekly (issued under the pseudonym “Issachar Barebone”) backed by figures around the Duke of Bedford and William Beckford. Pelham, who generally preferred to ignore hostile papers, wrote to Newcastle on 20 July 1753 that despite Ralph’s attacks “the less notice is taken of him the better.”

Throughout his career Ralph wrote for both Whig and Tory interests, but biographer Robert W. Kenny remarked that he was like “an honest politician … who when bought, stays bought.”

=== Pensions and later writing ===
In 1753 the Treasury awarded Ralph a pension of £300 per year—£200 paid immediately—with a similar grant to his collaborator William Guthrie, on condition that both men cease pamphleteering. Sources differ on who arranged the payment: McKinsey attributes it to the Duke of Newcastle, while Kenny names Lord Harrington. Thereafter, Ralph restricted his public writing to unsigned reviews of political and historical works in The Monthly Review, avoiding current controversies. Privately, however, he remained engaged in political affairs; in 1756 he advised the Duke of Newcastle on extending stamp duties to the American colonies.

In 1758 he published, anonymously, The Case of Authors by Profession. The tract argued that commercial publishers and booksellers had decisive control over what authors produced.

After the accession of George III in 1760, Ralph received a further pension from the administration of Lord Bute. He returned briefly to political pamphleteering with The Case of the Late Resignation (1761), a critique of William Pitt, 1st Earl of Chatham’s resignation from office, but chronic gout soon ended his writing career.

=== Illness and death ===
Ralph never returned to America, but he renewed contact with Benjamin Franklin in July 1757 when Franklin arrived in London as Pennsylvania’s agent carrying a letter from Ralph’s daughter, Mary Ralph Garrigues. Franklin asked her to delay further correspondence, noting that Ralph wished to keep his English household unaware of his American family.

Ralph’s English wife, Ann (née Curtis), died at Chiswick on 27 January 1760. In December 1761 their daughter Helen wrote to Franklin that her father was “out of Danger; but… remains very Low, and weak.” Ralph died on 24 January 1762, reportedly while planning a new pro-Bute newspaper, a project halted by gout.

Ralph’s library, about 350 lots, was auctioned in York Street, Covent Garden, on 5–6 April 1762; Franklin attended the sale and bought books amounting to £6 5s, reportedly to benefit “Ralph’s daughter.” McKinsey suggests this referred to Mary Garrigues and her eleven children in Philadelphia, as his English daughter, Helen, had died a few weeks after he did. Later that year, Mary’s eldest son, Isaac, travelled to London and asked Franklin for details of his grandfather’s death and any potential estate.

The 1765 will of Ann Curtis, Ralph’s mother-in-law, instructed her executor to pay “all the just debts of my late son-in-law James Ralph Esquire,” indicating that he left no significant property.

== Works ==
=== Poetry ===
- The Tempest; or, the Terrors of Death (1727) – Miltonic blank-verse meditation on mortality.
- Night, a Poem in Four Books (1728) – Ralph’s best-known verse, indebted to James Thomson’s Winter.
- Sawney, an Heroic Poem Occasion’d by the Dunciad (1728) – Satirical riposte to Pope; prompted Pope’s rejoinder in the 1729 Dunciad Variorum.
- The Muses’ Address to the King (1728) – brief panegyric later reprinted in Miscellaneous Poems.
- Zeuma; or, The Love of Liberty (1729) – blank‑verse heroic poem set in a mythic South‑American kingdom ruled by King Zeuma; fuses Miltonic cadence with Whig “ancient liberty” politics and offers one of Ralph’s earliest Americanised liberty myths.
- Clarinda; or, The Fair Libertine (1729).
- Miscellaneous Poems, by Several Hands (1729) – anthology “publish’d by Mr Ralph,” containing mostly his own verse.
- Ballad to the Tune of Chevy Chase (1749).

=== Drama and stage adaptations ===
- The Fashionable Lady (ballad-opera; Goodman's Fields, 1730) – Sometimes incorrectly cited as the first London staging by a colonial-born playwright.
- The Fall of the Earl of Essex (adapt. from The Unhappy Favourite; Goodman’s Fields, 1731; 4 performances).
- The Cornish Squire (adapt. from Squire Trelooby; Drury Lane, 1734; 5 performances).
- Anna Bullen — adaptation of Banks’s Vertue Betray’d; MS only (Huntington HM 973); unperformed; attributed to Ralph.
- The Lawyers’ Feast (farce; Drury Lane, Dec 1743; 3 performances).
- The Astrologer (comedy; Drury Lane, 3 Apr 1744; 1 performance).

=== Cultural criticism and reference works ===
- The Touch-Stone; or, Historical, Critical, Political, Philosophical, and Theological Essays on the Reigning Diversions of the Town (1728; re-issued 1731 as The Taste of the Town) – satirical survey of London theatre, opera, masquerades, fairs, and puppet-shows that has been credited with helping to inspire Fielding’s early burlesques.
- A Critical Review of the Publick Buildings, Statues and Ornaments in and about London and Westminster (1734) – authorship disputed; recent scholarship re-attributes it to Ralph based on its serialization in the Weekly Register (20 parts, 13 Oct 1733–6 Apr 1734) before separate publication.
- The Builder’s Dictionary; or, Gentleman and Architect’s Companion (2 vols., London: Bettesworth & Hitch, 1734) — published anonymously; Craske argues Ralph wrote the unsigned introduction and promoted the work in tandem with his Weekly Register series.
- The Case of Our Present Theatrical Disputes Fairly Stated (1743) — pamphlet on contemporary theatre controversies.

=== Historical and constitutional works ===
- A Critical History of the Administration of Sir Robert Walpole (1743).
- A History of England during the Reigns of King William, Queen Anne, and King George I (2 vols., 1744–46) – Ralph’s major historical project; it criticises Burnet’s History of His Own Time and addresses partisan errors in Whig and Tory narratives.
- The Use and Abuse of Parliaments (2 vols., 1744) – Expands Algernon Sidney’s tract into a two-volume Whig survey of Parliament and its “ancient” role as bulwark of English liberty. Edmund Waller and George Bubb Dodington may have had a hand in its preparation, though the extent of their contribution is unclear.

=== Political pamphlets and tracts ===
- The Plain Truth: or, A Dialogue between Sir Courtly Jobber, Candidate for the Borough of Guzzledown, and Tom Tell-Truth, Schoolmaster and Freeman in the Said Borough (1741) — attacks Carteret/Pulteney “patriotism” and argues against further continental commitments; attributed to Ralph on stylistic and contextual grounds.
- The Other Side of the Question (1742) — reply to the Duchess of Marlborough’s memoirs.
- A Defence of the People (1743) — often attributed to Ralph and the Earl of Chesterfield; a reply to Faction Detected by the Evidence of Facts, denying the persistence of a distinct Tory interest.
- The Case of the Late Resignation (1761) — critique of William Pitt’s resignation.

=== Authorship and the book trade ===
- The Case of Authors by Profession (1758, anonymous) — analysis of the economics of authorship; Mari (2015) discusses it as an early claim to occupational respectability for political journalists. Ralph had earlier assisted his Chiswick neighbour William Hogarth with preliminary planning for The Analysis of Beauty (1753).

=== Periodical work and editorships ===
- Principal writer (early 1731–c. 1735), The Weekly Register.
- Contributor, The Daily Courant (1730s).
- Reporter, Universal Spectator (1737–1739) – anti‑ministerial coverage of Parliament.
- Contributor (1739–1741), then editor (June 1741 – 1743), The Champion—launched by Henry Fielding; Ralph succeeded him as editor.
- Contributor, Common Sense (c. 1738–1743) – opposition weekly patronised by the Earl of Chesterfield.
- Co-editor, Old England (1743–1744) – opposition weekly backed by Chesterfield and Dodington; Ralph left after a ministerial pension arrangement in late 1744.
- Editor, The Remembrancer (1747–Nov 1749) – chief writer for the Prince of Wales’s opposition circle; persuaded Dodington to re‑join the faction.
- Editor, The Protester (2 June–10 November 1753), a Bedford-Whig weekly that opposed the Jewish Naturalization Act 1753.
- Reviewer (hist./pol.) for The Monthly Review (1756–1758).

=== Pseudonyms and house signatures ===
- “Benjamin Franklin” — Alias used while working as a schoolmaster near Reading (c. 1726).
- “A. Primcock” — pseudonym used on The Touch-Stone (1728) and on the 1731 reissue, The Taste of the Town; the epistle dedicatory is signed “A. Primcock.”
- “Jeffrey Broadbottom” — house persona of Old England employed jointly by Ralph and William Guthrie.
- “Issachar Barebone” — pseudonym used while editing The Protester (1753).

== Reception and legacy ==
Contemporary opinion was mixed. After Alexander Pope singled Ralph out in the Dunciad, the Grub Street Journal mocked “everything Ralph wrote,” and Horace Walpole called him “a dull author.” Paul Whitehead’s State Dunces (1733) likewise derided the “tiny witling … / Full fam’d for tuneless Rhimes and short-lived Plays.”

Ralph defended professional writing in his anonymous tract The Case of Authors by Profession (1758), which argues that paid authorship was no more “mercenary” than other lawful callings. See the main article for the tract’s argument and reception.

Although his poetry was generally dismissed, Ralph’s political and historical prose attracted sustained notice. A History of England (1744–46) retained readers into the nineteenth century and drew praise from historians such as Henry Hallam.

Modern historians emphasise Ralph’s prominence as a mid-century political journalist. Robert Harris calls him “one of the leading journalists of the period,” noting Ralph’s 1750s complaint that the press remained “in the Hands of Faction… not for their Amusement, but their service, not to inflame their Resentments, but to bring their Grievances, if any, to a fair, full, and effectual audit.” Laird Okie likewise judges: “Between the late 1730s and early 1760s Ralph and [William] Guthrie were probably the two foremost political journalists in England.”

Twentieth-century scholarship broadened the view of Ralph’s work. Helen Sand Hughes linked his satire to Henry Fielding’s early burlesques; Kenny highlighted his skill as an opposition journalist; and Laird Okie saw A History of England as a break with providential historiography, attentive to social and economic change. Elizabeth R. McKinsey interpreted Ralph’s writings as a sustained argument for literary, economic and constitutional liberty.

Questions of authorship have also shaped Ralph’s legacy. In the 1960s, bibliographer John B. Shipley confirmed Ralph’s authorship of The Touch-Stone (1728), a satirical survey of London entertainments long published anonymously. He also attributed the similarly anonymous 1734 architectural pamphlet A Critical Review of the Publick Buildings, Statues and Ornaments in and about London and Westminster to Ralph’s writing. Both attributions have since been accepted in Ralph scholarship.

Skepticism about these attributions partly stemmed from the technical knowledge the texts display. The Touch-Stone includes a history of opera in England that Irving Lowens described as “notable... for accuracy and for breadth of knowledge,” and as offering a serious defence of Italian opera. Because Ralph was closely associated with the English stage and had no known enthusiasm for opera, Lowens questioned whether he could have written it. Similarly, the Critical Review pamphlet was attributed by some Victorian cataloguers to a namesake surveyor, based on its architectural detail and citations of Acts of Parliament. Later analysis noted that Ralph’s humour was often “so subdued, or intertwined with seriousness” that critics failed to recognize its satirical intent.

A further tentative attribution is the manuscript adaptation Anna Bullen (Huntington Library, HM 973), which J. M. Bastian assigns to Ralph and dates to about 1735. He notes the eighteenth-century hand and paper, identifies Banks’s independent prose source, and rejects the earlier view that the MS predated Banks. Bastian builds the case on stylistic and technical parallels with Ralph’s Fall of the Earl of Essex: asides replaced by tête-à-têtes, regularised Augustan verse with more “rational” motivation, recurring diction and imagery (deserts/brutes; sea-storm/shipwreck; the phrase “give a loose”), and worked end-of-act similes. He also notes that the line “She’s Piercy’s now, and Piercy is all hers” matches a correction first introduced in the 1735 edition of Banks’s play, supporting (though not proving) a mid-1730s date. Bastian judges the play “unstageworthy”—subdued and dignified beside Banks—yet attractive to read for its pathos, especially the Anna–Piercy scenes, with occasional Miltonic colouring.

Ralph’s place of birth was also subject to confusion. Early biographical sources—including Appletons’ Cyclopædia of American Biography and the Dictionary of American Biography (1935)—described him as American-born, likely due to his early presence in Philadelphia and association with Franklin. Shipley’s 1964 archival study corrected the record, documenting Ralph’s birth in London around 1705.

== Sources ==
=== Secondary literature ===
- Bastian, J. M. (May 1962). "James Ralph's Second Adaptation from John Banks". Huntington Library Quarterly. 25 (3): 181–188. doi:10.2307/3816116. JSTOR 3816116.
- Bolingbroke, Henry St John (1841). The Works of Lord Bolingbroke. Vol. 2. Philadelphia: Carey & Hart.
- Burling, William J. (1992). A Checklist of New Plays and Entertainments on the London Stage, 1700–1737. Madison, NJ: Fairleigh Dickinson University Press.
- Burn, Jacob Henry (1865). Catalogue of a Collection of Early Newspapers and Essayists, formed by the late John Thomas Hope, Esq., and presented to the Bodleian Library (PDF). Oxford: Clarendon Press.
- Coley, W. B. (1962). "The "Remarkable Queries" in the Champion". Philological Quarterly. 41: 426–436.
- Coxe, William (1798). Memoirs of the Administration of the Right Honourable Henry Pelham. Vol. 2. London: T. Cadell, jun. and W. Davies.
- Craske, Matthew (2004). "From Burlington Gate to Billingsgate: James Ralph's attempt to impose Burlingtonian classicism as a canon of public taste". In Arciszewska, Barbara; McKellar, Elizabeth (eds.). Articulating British Classicism: New Approaches to Eighteenth-Century Architecture. Aldershot: Ashgate. pp. 97–118. ISBN 978-0754637356.
- Dodington, George Bubb (1784). Henry Penruddocke Wyndham (ed.). The Diary of the Late George Bubb Dodington, Baron of Melcombe Regis: From March 8, 1749, to February 6, 1761. With an Appendix, Containing Some Curious and Interesting Papers. London: E. Easton. p. 79.
- Fielding, Henry (2004). Lockwood, Thomas (ed.). The Plays of Henry Fielding, Volume 1: 1728–1731. The Works of Henry Fielding. Oxford: Oxford University Press.
- Foord, Archibald S. (1964). His Majesty's Opposition, 1714–1830. Oxford: Clarendon Press.
- Franklin, Benjamin (1959). Leonard W. Labaree (ed.). The Autobiography of Benjamin Franklin. The Papers of Benjamin Franklin. Vol. 1. New Haven: Yale University Press.
- Genest, John (1832). Some Account of the English Stage from the Restoration in 1660 to 1830. Vol. 2. Bath: H. E. Carrington.
- Hallam, Henry (1827). The Constitutional History of England: From the Accession of Henry VII to the Death of George II. John Murray.
- Hanson, Laurence (1936). Government and the Press, 1695–1763. London: Oxford University Press.
- Harris, R. (1935). "Ralph, James". Dictionary of American Biography. Vol. 15. New York: Charles Scribner’s Sons.
- Harris, Robert (1993). A Patriot Press: National Politics and the London Press in the 1740s. Oxford: Oxford University Press.
- Hughes, Helen Sand (1922). "Fielding's Indebtedness to James Ralph". Modern Philology. 20 (1): 19–29. doi:10.1086/387429. JSTOR 433329.
- Jenner, Mark S. R. (2017). "Print Culture and the Rebuilding of London after the Fire: The Presumptuous Proposals of Valentine Knight". Journal of British Studies. 56 (1): 189–213. doi:10.1017/jbr.2016.115. JSTOR 26598969.
- Kenny, Robert W. (1934). James Ralph, Author by Profession (PhD dissertation). Brown University.
- Kenny, Robert W. (1940). "James Ralph: An Eighteenth-Century Philadelphian in Grub Street". The Pennsylvania Magazine of History and Biography. 64 (2): 218–242. JSTOR 20087279.
- Lemay, J. A. Leo (2006). The Life of Benjamin Franklin. Vol. 1: Journalist, 1706–1730. University of Pennsylvania Press. doi:10.9783/9780812209112. ISBN 978-0-8122-3854-9.
- Loftis, John (1963). The Politics of Drama in Augustan England. Oxford: Clarendon Press.
- Lowens, Irving (1959). "The Touch-Stone (1728): A Neglected View of London Opera". The Musical Quarterly. 45 (3): 325–342. doi:10.1093/mq/XLV.3.325. JSTOR 740520.
- Mari, William Thomas (2015). "Writer by Trade: James Ralph's Claims to Authorship". Authorship. 4 (2). doi:10.21825/aj.v4i2.1439.
- McKillop, Alan D. (1961). "James Ralph in Berkshire". Studies in English Literature, 1500–1900. 1 (3): 43–51. doi:10.2307/449304. JSTOR 449304.
- McKinsey, Elizabeth R. (1973). "James Ralph: The Professional Writer Comes of Age". Proceedings of the American Philosophical Society. 117 (1): 59–78. JSTOR 985948.
- Okie, Laird (1991). Augustan Historical Writing: Historiography in England, 1688–1750. Lanham, MD: University Press of America.
- Okie, Laird (2004). "Ralph, James (1705?–1762)". Oxford Dictionary of National Biography (online ed.). Oxford University Press. doi:10.1093/ref:odnb/23060. (Subscription, Wikipedia Library access or UK public library membership required.)
- Perry, Thomas W. (1962). Public Opinion, Propaganda, and Politics in Eighteenth-Century England: A Study of the Jew Bill of 1753. Cambridge, MA: Harvard University Press.
- Pope, Alexander (1729). The Dunciad Variorum (1729). J. Wright.
- Ralph, James (1744). Of the Use and Abuse of Parliaments. Vol. 1. London: Printed for Jacob Robinson.
- Ralph, James (1758). The Case of Authors by Profession or Trade, Stated. London: Printed for R. Griffiths.
- Shaw, William A., ed. (1898). Calendar of Treasury Books and Papers, 1729–1745: Volume 2, 1735–1738. Vol. 2. London: Her Majesty's Stationery Office.
- Shipley, John B. (1956). "Franklin Attends a Book Auction". Pennsylvania Magazine of History and Biography. 80 (1): 37–45. JSTOR 20088822.
- Shipley, John B. (1964). "James Ralph's Place and Date of Birth". American Literature. 36 (3): 343–346. JSTOR 2923549.
- Shipley, John B. (1963). James Ralph: Pretender to Genius (PhD thesis). New York: Columbia University.
- Shipley, John B. (1968). "The Authorship of "The Touch-Stone"". Papers of the Bibliographical Society of America. 62 (2): 189–198. doi:10.1086/pbsa.62.2.24301925. JSTOR 24301925.
- Stephen, Leslie (1896). "Ralph, James". In Leslie Stephen (ed.). Dictionary of National Biography. Vol. 47. London: Smith, Elder & Co. pp. 286–287.
- Wilson, James Grant; Fiske, John, eds. (1900). "Ralph, James". Appletons' Cyclopædia of American Biography. Vol. 5. New York: D. Appleton and Company.

=== Catalogues & digital resources ===
- "Will of Ann Curtis, Widow of Chiswick, Middlesex". The National Archives (UK). 1765.
- "The Builder's Dictionary; or, Gentleman and Architect's Companion (2 vols.)". English Short Title Catalogue. British Library. 1734.
- Library of Congress. "The touch-stone; or, Historical, critical, political, philosophical, and theological essays on the reigning diversions of the town — page images". "Dedication signed: A. Primcock (pseud. of James Ralph)."
- WorldCat (1731). "The taste of the town: or, a guide to all publick diversions". "Epistle dedicatory signed: A. Primcock [i.e. James Ralph]."
- National Library of Australia (1731). "The taste of the town; or, a guide to all publick diversions". "Epistle dedicatory signed: A. Primcock (a pseudonym of James Ralph)."
