= Henry Fielding's early plays =

Early literary career

The early plays of Henry Fielding mark the beginning of Fielding's literary career. His early plays span the time period from his first production in 1728 to the beginning of the Actor's Rebellion of 1733, a strife within the Theatre Royal, Drury Lane that divided the theatrical community and threatened to disrupt London stage performances. These plays introduce Fielding's take on politics, gender, and morality and serve as an early basis for how Fielding develops his ideas on these matters throughout his career.

== Background ==
Fielding first produced a play in February 1728. Although his first production, Love in Several Masques, lasted only a few nights, it was the start of his career in theatre. On 16 March 1728, Fielding enrolled at the University of Leyden, but he did not abandon the theatre. His early plays were those of an amateur hobby, but he later returned to London to earn a living. Arthur Murphy, in his 1762 biographical introduction to Fielding's works, believed that Fielding returned to London and treated the theatre as a career because his father stopped an allowance of 200 pounds a year.

However, there is little evidence that Fielding lacked funds, or that such a lack of funds would cause him to leave Leyden to return to writing plays; Fielding eventually returned to Leyden on 22 February 1729. It is not known when or why Fielding left the school, but he produced The Temple Beau on 26 January 1730, which suggests that he returned to London by November 1729. By the time of his return, he had three plays, either still in draft form or complete: Don Quixote in England, The Wedding-Day and The Temple Beau. Of these, only The Temple Beau was accepted for the stage.

When Fielding returned to working with the Royal Theatre, his piece The Lottery became an immediate success and lasted for decades after. Combined with The Modern Husband, Fielding could have received up to 1,000 pounds from the plays' first run. This placed Fielding at the position of being the main contributor of plays to the Royal Theatre. Currently, Fielding is primarily viewed as a novelist, but his plays suggest that he wished to be a playwright and that his career would be in theatre. Although Fielding wrote twenty-six plays, only a handful of them were ever published in critical editions before 1990.

== Early plays ==
The early plays include Love in Several Masques, The Temple Beau, The Author's Farce, Tom Thumb, Rape upon Rape, The Tragedy of Tragedies, The Letter Writers, The Welsh Opera, The Grub-Street Opera, The Lottery, The Modern Husband, The Old Debauchees, The Covent-Garden Tragedy, and The Mock Doctor. These plays start in 1727, when Fielding first worked on Love in Several Masques, until the disruption of the winter 1732–1733 theatre season at the Theatre Royal, Drury Lane. This disruption, caused by illness, management problems, and other incidents, started the Actor Rebellion of 1733.

=== 1727–1728 ===
Love in Several Masques was Fielding's first play, and was first released on 16 February 1728. Though the play was never revived and only ran for four nights, it still did moderately well especially when compared with the competing plays at that time. In the play, three respectable males each meet a female counterpart three times, and share a parallel incident with letters and an unmasking. Fielding focuses on men and how he believes they should prove their worth before marriage. It also highlights Fielding's belief in the relationship of morality and libertine beliefs and introduces character types that Fielding would use throughout his plays and novels.

Don Quixote in England was started as Fielding's second play, but it was not finished and produced until the later part of his career. After Fielding returned to London from the University of Leyden during the end of 1729, he brought with him a version of Don Quixote in England. It was refused by the Theatre Royal and it was not produced or printed until 1734. The only information on the origins of this play come from Fielding's 1734 preface. It was his second play, and Fielding attributes it to being written at Leyden during 1728. It was intended more as amusement than as a serious production and was an imitation of Cervantes's Don Quixote. After the prompting of Barton Booth and Colley Cibber, Fielding put away the play until 1733, when the Drury-Lane actors asked him for a new play. Soon after, Fielding rewrote parts of the play.

The Wedding Day was started as his third play, but it was not finished until years later and finally brought out on both the stage and in print after his theatrical career ended. After Fielding returned to London from the University of Leyden during the end of 1729, he brought with him a version of The Wedding-Day. It was refused by John Rich to be staged, and it was not produced until 1743 by David Garrick. The only information on the origins of this play come from Fielding's preface to the play in his Miscellanies (1743). In it, Fielding says that he intended the leads, Millamour and Charlotte, for Robert Wilks and Anne Oldfield. However, Oldfield died before the play could be produced, and Fielding and Wilks got into a fight, which made it impossible for Fielding to convince him to join the production.

=== 1729–1730 ===
Fielding started work on his fourth play, The Temple Beau, in April 1729, but did not finish until the end of the year. Rejected by his first theatre, the play had to be performed at another one, where it had 13 shows its first year and few revivals thereafter. The play is about Wilding, a young law student who gives up his studies to seek pleasure, and his attempts to marry a woman for her money. Fielding focuses on hypocrisy and gender equality in marriage with characters' interaction with Wilding.

Fielding's fifth play, The Author's Farce and the Pleasures of the Town, first opened on 30 March 1730 at the Little Theatre, Haymarket, and initially ran for 41 nights, which marked it as a major success. The play incorporates Fielding's response to Drury Lane and their previous rejection of his works. It also contains a third act, a puppet show, that pokes fun at theatre and the literary community as a whole. The play was revived many times in its original format and later in the medium of puppet show for its entire format. The plot focuses on Harry Luckless, an author, as he attempts to have a successful writing career, pursue women, dodge his landlady, and eventually put on a show within the show. To emphasise the literary satire, Fielding introduced his persona "Scriblerus Secundus" and adopts the tradition of the Scriblerus Club.

Tom Thumb, Fielding's sixth play, was added to the ninth showing of The Author's Farce, 24 April 1730. Together, the shows lasted at the Haymarket until they were replaced by Fielding's next production, Rape upon Rape. Tom Thumb was later included with other productions, including Rape upon Rape, and later transformed into the Tragedy of Tragedies. In the print edition, Fielding added footnotes, prefaces, and prologues, which introduced the narratorial style found in Fielding's later works. The plot deals with the English hero, Tom Thumb, who is of only tiny proportions. After defeating a group of giants, Tom Thumb is handsomely rewarded by King Arthur, which later erupts in a comical love triangle between Tom, Arthur's wife Queen Dollalolla, and Princess Huncamunca. Tom is eventually swallowed by a cow and killed. Soon after, his ghost appears but meets an untimely death. This scene reportedly provoked Jonathan Swift to laughter, a rare feat. The farcical nature of Tom Thumb pokes fun at 17th and 18th-century tragedy, gender roles and gender politics.

Fielding's seventh play, Rape upon Rape; or, The Justice Caught in His Own Trap, was a five-act comedic play that first ran on 23 June 1730 at the Little Theatre for eight nights. The play enjoyed some success until it was renamed The Coffee-House Politician and was altered to possibly update the play as it focused on mocking current news events. The play is a love comedy that incorporates a corrupt judge that stands in the lovers' way. Eventually, various characters attempt to stop the judge, but he prevails albeit in a comedic fashion. Fielding's focus in the play is to point out corruption in government and to attack those who abuse their power.

=== 1731 ===
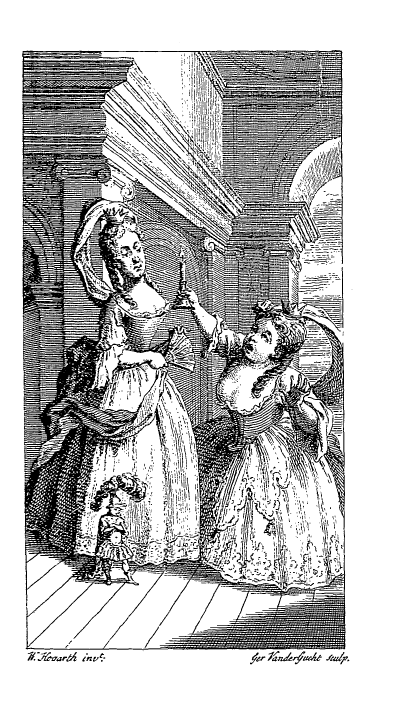
Frontistpiece to The Tragedy of Tragedies by Hogarth

Fielding's expanded version of Tom Thumb, The Tragedy of Tragedies, first ran on 24 March 1731. Its printed edition was "edited" and "commented" on by Fielding's pseudonym H. Scriblerus Secundus who pretends not to be the original author, and it contains a frontispiece by Hogarth, which serves as the earliest proof of a relationship between Fielding and Hogarth. There are few major changes to the plot's outline except that Grizzle became Tom's rival for Huncamunca's heart, and Tom is not killed by Grizzle. Instead, Tom is able to defeat Grizzle, which changes the outcome of the play. Furthermore, there is an emphasis on faulty language and Fielding emphasises the problems within poorly written tragedies.

Fielding's ninth play, the unsuccessful The Letter Writers Or, a New Way to Keep a Wife at Home, ran for four nights as a companion piece to The Tragedy of Tragedies but was soon after replaced by The Welsh Opera on 22 April 1731. The play followed two characters whose wives are busy having affairs and how they attempt to keep their wives faithful. The immoral characters are forgiven within the play and there is a lack of moral commentary within the plot.

The tenth play and new companion piece to The Tragedy of Tragedies, The Welsh Opera, ran many times until it was expanded into The Grub-Street Opera. The expanded version of the play, The Grub-Street Opera, was not put on for an audience, which provoked E. Rayner to print The Welsh Opera without Fielding's consent. The play serves both as a tribute to the Scriblerians, especially Gay and Gay's The Beggar's Opera, and to put forth a political allegory that satirises Walpole's government and the British monarchy. In particular, it mocked the feud between Walpole and Pulteney, a Privy Councillor.

The expanded and altered version of The Welsh Opera, The Grub-Street Opera, was first rehearsed in May 1731, but it never ran on stage. It was printed and exists in a complete printed format, and it is possible that it was not performed because of government intervention. Its original printing was done without Fielding's consent, and it is uncertain as to when Fielding's official version of the play was printed. The plot focuses on a standard love story but with characters that exhibit less than virtuous characteristics. The title pokes fun at the Grub Street Journal and also links to the theme within the plot of attacking theatre in general.

=== 1732 ===
After Fielding returned to working with the Royal Theatre, Drury Lane, he wrote The Lottery, which first ran on 1 January 1732 alongside Addison's Cato. The play was successful and was performed 15 times during January. He altered the play in February, and the revised form ran for 14 more nights during that season and was put on each year until 1740 and occasionally thereafter until 1783. The story deals with Chloe's desire to play the lottery and pokes fun at the London lottery system and those who support it.

Fielding's thirteenth play, The Modern Husband, first ran on 14 February 1732. The play ran for 13 nights at Drury Lane, rivalling the run of The Provoked Husband and Zara for production length. Although early-20th-century critics believed that the play could not be popular, it did make money and even put on a benefit show on 2 March 1732. The play was not revived later, possibly because the principal actors of the play died soon after and the plot of the play discouraged new actors from wanting to play the parts. The plot deals with a man selling his wife for money and the attempted abuse of the adultery laws.

The Old Debauchees, originally titled The Despairing Debauchee, appeared with The Covent-Garden Tragedy on 1 June 1732. The play ran for six nights and was later paired with The Mock Doctor. The play was later revived to attack Catholics during the disputes with the Stuarts between 1745 and 1746. The play alludes to the 1731 trial of Father Girard, a Jesuit tried for using magic during an attempted seduction/rape of a young girl. The nature of the attacks against Catholicism within the play undermines the overall humour of the play.

Although The Covent-Garden Tragedy appeared with The Old Debauchees, it was not a success like the other play and quickly dropped. The Covent Garden Tragedy was immediately ended after its first night because, according to Fielding, of the play's use of a brothel as a setting. After all, the plot focuses on a love triangle between characters in a brothel. Even though the first night fell apart, the play was later performed; it eventually appeared again for four nights with Don Quixote in England, once on its own in 1734, and a few later times during the 18th century, including as a puppet show.

Fielding's sixteenth play, The Mock Doctor: or The Dumb Lady Cur'd, replaced The Covent Garden Tragedy as the companion play to The Old Debauchees. The play is an Anglicised adaptation of Molière's Le Medecin malgre Lui. It first ran on 23 June 1732 and was later revised in 1732; both versions were very successful. The plot deals with a young girl pretending to be mute to avoid having to marry a man she does not like while her doctor is really a man pretending to be a doctor to con the other characters.

== Structure and concern ==
In 1728, John Gay's The Beggar's Opera was extremely successful and ran for 62 times during the season, an unprecedented length of time. The play began to change London theatre through the introduction of political themes and experimentation in form. Following this trend, Fielding pushed politics into the forefront of his plays. This provoked criticism from all sides, including from the playwright Colley Cibber. However, The Beggar's Opera is not Fielding's only influence; Fielding is part of the theatrical tradition surrounding him, and, as Harold Pagliaro points out, "Fielding's first play, like all those to follow, is among other things an accommodation to the world of theatre in which he worked."

Fielding was concerned with the audience's reaction to his various scenes. This is internally reflected in the actions of the character Merital in Love in Several Masques in controlling the behaviour of Helen and that many of his characters believe that they are either actors or are performing on a stage. Also, this is a primary concern of Fielding's when he crafted his Scriblerian plays.

Reading and how reading defines characters is a focus within many plays and in Fielding's later works. In Love in Several Masques, the character Wisemore focuses on classics but ignores contemporary society. Similarly, the character Wilding, in The Temple Beau, practices law but doesn't read at all. Reading is an outlet to understanding humanity, and Fielding uses his plays to inform an audience how to better understand humanity.

Morality and moral characters was an important concern within Fielding's works, and his first play serves as a representation for Fielding's believes surrounding the relationship between morality and libertine beliefs that is found throughout his work. The plays also introduces most of the character types that Fielding would reuse throughout his plays and novels. However, his use of libertine themes and characters served as a way for those like Pat Rogers to believe that Fielding lacked an orthodox understanding of Christianity; he believes that Fielding was harsh towards hypocrisy but not against other actions. In particular, Rogers claims, "Fielding was generous enough in that sphere of morality, however implacable he might be in his larger political and religious attachment. Provided that soldiers were brave and loyal he did not require their lives to be models of absolute purity." Tiffany Potter follows this idea by claiming, "Eliminating a moral imperative to drama (and to life in general) gives Fielding the liberty to create unconventional characters and to set plays anywhere from ballrooms to brothels without having to defend anything more than his own stance on issues. The necessity of even that defence, however, is usually negated by his libertine belief in privilege.

=== Gender ===
Gender plays a large role within Fielding's moral critique, and effeminacy is a means to emphasise a male character's moral shortcomings or problematic deviations from social and cultural traditions. On occasion, however, explicitly effeminate characters are developed in a way that they endear themselves to the audience--as is the case with "Tom Thumb", a role that was originally performed by a child actress. This strategy, characteristic of a savvy playwright who knew how to cater for a widely diverse spectatorship, produced an ambiguous effect that complicates our understanding of heroism and gender roles in Fielding's plays. Starting with Love in Several Masques, the stock characters that he relies on emphasise the deviations by recalling traditional behavioural stereotypes and in their commentary on the masculinity or femininity of other characters. The political implications for gender extend to a criticism of powerful female within the domestic and public domains. Many of the problems portrayed within the plays are the results of the domestic sphere extended into politics, especially within Tom Thumb. As Jill Campbell points out, not only does Fielding critique women in power, but the reversals of gender and power serve as a way to say that private concerns are taking priority over public concerns. In his plays and his novels, women are used as a way to discuss the internal aspects of humans, which includes both emotions and morality. Although Fielding sometimes uses females to express ideal ways to act, he does mock women who abuse their relationship with the internal, emotions, and morality to dominate and assume power. This theme appears as early as Love in Several Masques and continues throughout, especially in prose parody Shamela where Shamela falsifies claims to virtue to control and get ahead in life.

Fielding does not limit his analysis of gender roles to just the living; the image of the ghost plays a significant part in many of Fielding's plays, including The Author's Farce, the Tom Thumb plays, and The Covent Garden Tragedy. Even though Fielding fails to explain what the existence of ghosts means, the image of the ghost can serve as a metaphor for Fielding's expectation of women who are supposed to be publicly virtuous. According to Campbell,

woman bears the representational burden for Fielding of his disappointment about the relation between internal and external selves, as, culturally, she must sustain the realm of private life, interior feeling, and personal identity apart from the public and commercial world of the male; inevitably, then, she must fail Fielding through her reliance on the 'harlotry' of pomp, ostentation, or the drama of self-display if she is to be a part of this world. And yet, he fears her alternative fate as a ghost as well, though he may seem to wish it on her.

Not every critic sees that Fielding sets up an inevitable fall for women. Potter argues that:

Women are neither victims of deceitful men nor overdefensive virgins, but individuals who can choose to 'bestow' their favours on a man who will 'enjoy' them. In the earliest examples of the redefinition that develops throughout Fielding's works, virtue is no longer simply virginity, but something malleable and powerful in the hands of a woman granted the agency and intelligence to determine her own sexuality.

Counter to Campbell, Potter seems to emphasise how gender is removed and emphasises that Fielding sees gender as a social construct. There is a balancing of the genders and neither is favoured over the other. To Potter, "Only the weakening of humanity through cross-adoption of the most ridiculous qualities of either gender is attacked in Fielding's plays."

== Critical reception ==
The reception of Fielding's plays received early recognition; his early plays placed him in a position of popularity alongside Gay. George Bernard Shaw believed that Fielding was "the greatest practising dramatist, with the single exception of Shakespeare, produced in England between the Middle Ages and the nineteenth century." However, modern critics rarely agree with Shaw, as Robert Hume points out, "Few scholars have been much interested in Fielding's highly successful career as a dramatist. To most it has seemed a false start. Readers tend to find the conventional plays derivative and sentimental, the topical ones scrappy and superficial." In particular, only one book until 1988 was published on the topic, which was Ducrocq's Le theatre de Fielding, 1728–1737, et ses prolongements dans l'oeuvre romanesque. This critical approach is not limited to just Fielding, but to the whole field; the reputation of Colley Cibber was ruined by Pope's characterising him as the Arch Dunce and "Since the plays of Cibber's only serious rival, Henry Fielding, are hardly even read these days, let alone performed, the earlier eighteenth-century theater tends to be passed over with (at best) a polite cough."

J. Paul Hunter believes that:

Fielding's plays do not prophesy that he will become a major novelist, but the direction of his theatrical career does suggest concerns that increasingly led him away from pure representation [...] Fielding's separation from the theatre was a forced one, but the expulsion was fortunate, freeing him from a relationship and commitment that had always been in some sense against the grain [...] Fielding's way is not really very dramatic, either in novels or in plays; he never developed stage-likely objective correlatives, having reserved his artistic energy for the examining process in which the action is rerun again and again, reviewed, considered, nearly masticated.

To Albert Rivero, ten of the plays "mark significant moments in [Fielding's] theatrical life": Love in Several Masques, The Temple Beau, The Author's Farce, Tom Thumb, The Tragedy of Tragedies, Rape upon Rape, The Grub Street Opera, The Modern Husband, Pasquin, and The Historical Register. Similarly, Potter organised the plays by a general theme of developing libertine characters and believed that "Fielding's most successful group of plays followed Love in Several Masques both chronologically and thematically. Comedies and burlesques such as The Author's Farce, The Tragedy of Tragedies, The Old Debauchees, and Pasquin made Fielding the most popular playwright of the 1730s, and all of these plays contain characters, situations, and dialogues that invoke libertine philosophy in some way, thought they vary in the explicitness of the depiction." In his biography of Fielding, Pagliaro declares that "Between 1727 and 1737, by which time he was only 30 years old, Fielding became England's most successful living playwright."
