= Moll King (coffee house proprietor) =

English prostitute, pickpocket, and thief

Elizabeth Adkins
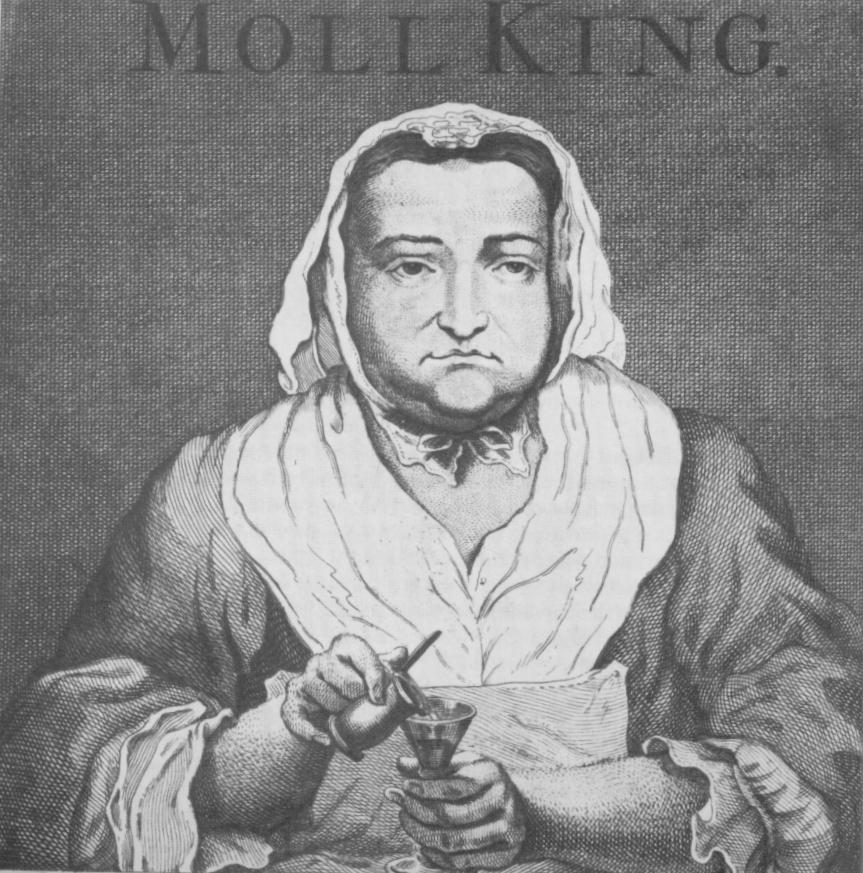
- Scan of print from book Wits, Wenchers and Wantons by E. J. Burford
- Born: 1696; Vine Street, St Giles in the Fields, London, England
- Died: 17 September 1747 (aged 50–51); Haverstock Hill, London, England
- Other names: Moll King
- Occupations: Coffeehouse proprietress, prostitute
- Known for: Co-owning Tom King's Coffee House, Allegedly inspiring Daniel Defoe's novel Moll Flanders
- Criminal charge: Disorderly house
- Spouse: Tom King
- Children: One

Elizabeth Adkins, who was also known as Moll King, Moll Bird, Mary Godson, Mary and Maria Godson (1696 – 17 September 1747), was a prominent figure in London's underworld during the early 18th century. She owned King's Coffeehouse with her husband Tom King and she also allegedly worked in the sex trade and as a pickpocket.

Adkins has been connected in historical analysis to a London criminal named Moll King, and court documents suggest Moll King was born at least twenty years before.

== Biography ==
According to a pamphlet published anonymously in 1747, Adkins was born in 1696 in Vine Street, London. The Life and Character of Moll King states that Adkins' father was a shoemaker and that her mother sold fish, fruit and greens in the street. It also suggests Adkins became a prostitute before the age of fourteen.

Adkins was married to a man named Thomas King, known around the area as Smooth'd-Fac'd-Tom, at fourteen, and was linked several years later to William Murray. When this second relationship ended, Adkins befriended a famous courtesan Sally Salisbury and began her own work in the sex trade. During this time, between 1715 and 1720, Adkins began using her aliases, Mary or Maria Godson.

Adkins returned to her husband King, and the two began a business selling nuts on the street. By 1717, the nut stand had grown into the storefront called King's Coffeehouse. Guests at the coffeehouse included many of London's most famous sex workers, including Mother Needham and Mother Whyburn. Adkins was thought to be the driving force behind the coffee house, and became a money-lender.

Although never a brothel as such, the coffee house was a meeting place for pimps, prostitutes and their clients. To avoid prosecution for keeping a brothel, there were no beds on the premises. King and her clientele spoke in a slang called "flash talk" to try and confuse any eavesdroppers to the conversations. Tom and Moll King were arrested in 1737 for keeping a disorderly house and fined.

The Kings bought a parcel of land at Haverstock Hill and built a 'genteel villa' and three substantial houses. The villa became known as 'Molly King's Folly, and was occupied by King's protege Nancy Dawson. King was known in the area as the "Little Princess".

Adkins' husband, King, died in 1739, allegedly of complications due to his alcoholism. After her husband's death King continued to run the coffee house by herself. Her tolerant attitude frequently gave way to rages and she earned a new nickname, "The Virago". Adkins increasingly showed drunken behaviour which landed her in court frequently. She was adept at playing the system and sometimes manipulated her court appearances to be transferred to the Court of King's Bench. The prosecution did not pursue the charges due to the much greater expense of King's Bench hearings. After refusing to pay a £200 fine for keeping a disorderly house, King was imprisoned. King remarried to a Mr Hoff.

King retired in about 1745. Following a long illness, she died on 17 September 1747, in her country house at Haverstock Hill. Adkins left her money to her son, who was described as a "very hopeful young fellow and on whom she bestowed a liberal education at Eton School".

== Bibliography ==
- Arnold, Catharine (2010). City of Sin: London and its Vices. Simon and Schuster. ISBN 978-0-85720-025-9.
- Berry, Helen (2001). "Rethinking Politeness in Eighteenth-Century England: Moll King's Coffee House and the Significance of 'Flash Talk': The Alexander Prize Lecture". Transactions of the Royal Historical Society. 11: 65–81. doi:10.1017/S0080440101000044. ISSN 0080-4401. JSTOR 3679414. S2CID 163087308.
- Burford, E. J. (1986). Wits, Wenchers, and Wantons: London's Low Life : Covent Garden in the Eighteenth Century. Robert Hale Limited. ISBN 978-0-7090-2629-7.
- Chrystal, Paul (2016). Coffee: A Drink for the Devil. Amberley Publishing Limited. ISBN 978-1-4456-4840-8.
- Cross, Germaine (2005). Play of Colors: The Legend of Opal Whiteley. ISBN 978-0-595-36523-4.
- Cruickshank, Dan (2010). London's Sinful Secret: The Bawdy History and Very Public Passions of London's Georgian Age. St. Martin's Publishing Group. ISBN 978-1-4299-1956-2.
- Dolby, Karen (2013). Historys Naughty Bits. Michael O'Mara Books. ISBN 978-1-78243-167-1.
- Eger, Elizabeth; Grant, Charlotte; Warburton, Penny; Gallchoir, Clíona Ó, eds. (2001). Women, Writing and the Public Sphere, 1700-1830. Cambridge University Press. ISBN 978-0-521-77106-1.
- Phillips, Nicola Jane (2006). Women in Business, 1700-1850. Boydell & Brewer Ltd. ISBN 978-1-84383-183-9.
- The Life and Character of Moll King, Late Mistress of King's Coffee-House in Covent-Garden ... Containing a True Narrative of this Well-known Lady, from Her Birth to Her Death ... Also the Flash Dialogue Between Moll King and Old Gentleman Harry ... To the Whole is Added, an Epitaph and Elegy ... And a Key to the Flash Dialogue. W. Price. 1747.
- Register, Monthly Literary (January 1824). "Sir Richard Steele's Cottage at Haverstock Hill". The Monthly Magazine. 56 (6).
