= John Misaubin =

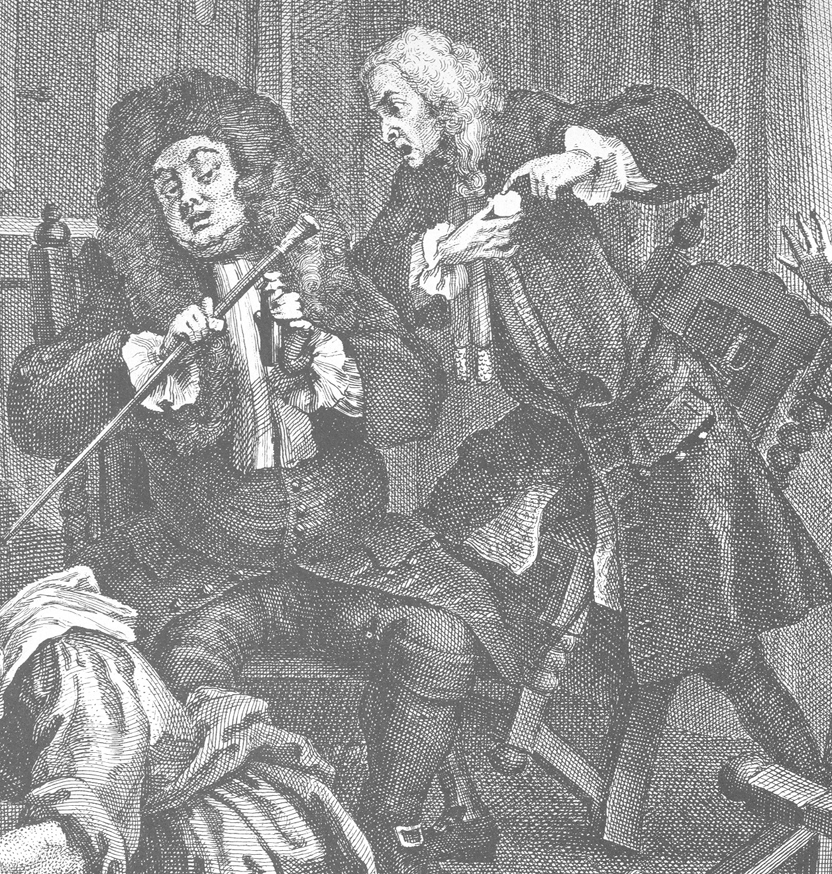
John Misaubin (right) argues with Dr. Richard Rock in William Hogarth's 1732 A Harlot's Progress while his patient dies of venereal disease.

John (Jean) Misaubin (1673 – 20 April 1734) was an 18th-century Huguenot French and British physician and "quack."

== Career ==
He was born in Mussidan, in the Dordogne in France. His father was a Protestant clergyman who later preached in the French Church in Spitalfields. He qualified as a medical doctor in Cahors. As a Huguenot, he later left France for London. There, he married Martha (Marthe) Angibaud in 1709. She was the daughter of Charles Angibaud, formerly Louis XIV's apothecary and also a Huguenot who had left France in 1681, shortly before the revocation of the Edict of Nantes in 1685. Angibaud was later master of the Worshipful Company of Apothecaries in 1728. Both Angibaud and Misaubin had premises on St Martin's Lane.

Misaubin became a naturalized subject of the Crown in 1719. The same year, he passed the three-part examination (physiology, pathology and therapeutics) to become a licentiate of the Royal College of Physicians. Dual qualified, in France and Great Britain, he was clearly a highly trained doctor. Biographer Miriam Austin Locke has noted that "although a qualified practitioner, he was ridiculed as a quack because of the peculiarity of his foreign manner and his strange methods of practice." He became a freemason in 1730, joining the Horn Lodge in the company of several English noblemen.

Misaubin appeared in a number of satirical prints. Strikingly tall and thin, he was ridiculed for his fondness for alcohol, his outlandish manners, and his thick French accent: Watteau quoted his saying "Prenez les pilules". He was the model for the doctor in William Hogarth's The Harlot's Progress (Plate 5), and he is one of four physicians held up for ridicule in Henry Fielding's Tom Jones. Fielding says that Misaubin told people to address letters to him as "To Dr. Misaubin in the World" for "there were few People in it to whom his great Reputation was not known" (Tom Jones, book 13, chapter 2). He is also mocked in Fielding's The Mock Doctor (1732).

His museum at 96 St Martin's Lane may also have been the setting for the third and fifth scenes in Hogarth's Marriage à-la-mode, where the young Viscount brings a lady of little reputation to a quack doctor to cure her complaint, and brings her back to complain that the pills have not worked. Misaubin is clearly not the quack doctor depicted.

Misaubin died in London, and his death notices referred to him as "the eminent physician". His son, Edmund, was murdered in 1740, aged 23.
