= Charles Angibaud =

French apothecary

- Born: Saintes, Charente-Maritime, France
- Scientific career
- Fields: Pharmacy

Charles Angibaud was a French apothecary. He became the royal apothecary to King Louis XIV, but moved to London to avoid persecution as a Protestant Huguenot. In London, he became Master of the Society of Apothecaries.

Charles was born into a family of apothecaries in Saintes, near Bordeaux. He followed his grandfather, Jean, and his father, Daniel, into the family business.

Angibaud became the royal apothecary to Louis XIV in Paris. Louis presented him with an ornate mortar in 1678 (now in the collection of the Royal Pharmaceutical Society in London). Louis had the mortar cast from bell metal (a copper and tin alloy) in the French royal foundry. It has a diameter of 48 cm (19 inches), is 36 cm (14 inches) high, and weighs 129 kilograms (284 pounds). It is decorated with three coats of arms on the front, has ram's heads as handles on either side, and bears an inscription "CHARLES ANGIBAVD ME APPRE ET ORDINAIRE DV ROI A PARIS 1678".

Angibaud left France in 1681, with his wife and three children, moving to London to avoid religious persecution, only a few years before the revocation of the Edict of Nantes in 1685. He became a naturalised British subject. He became a freeman of the Society of Apothecaries on 6 October 1685, enabling him to practice his profession in London. He established his business on St Martin's Lane, selling in particular his Pastilles de Blois made from licorice. His daughter, Martha (Marthe) married another Huguenot apothecary in London, John (Jean) Misaubin, in 1709, who also had premises on St. Martin's Lane and was famously depicted by William Hogarth in a painting in the series, A Harlot's Progress.

Angibaud rose high in the Society of Apothecaries. He became a liveryman in 1699, was Renter Warden in 1721, Upper Warden in 1726 and became Master on 22 August 1728. He also enjoyed royal patronage in England. He was appointed an apothecary to Charles II in 1684, and was made Apothecary-General to the Army and Military Hospitals in Ireland under William III and Mary II in 1689.
