= The Mock Doctor =

Play written by Henry Fielding

The Mock Doctor: or The Dumb Lady Cur'd is a play by Henry Fielding and first ran on 23 June 1732 at the Theatre Royal, Drury Lane. It served as a replacement for The Covent-Garden Tragedy and became the companion play to The Old Debauchees. It tells the exploits of a man who pretends to be a doctor at his wife's requests.

The play is an adaptation of Molière's Le Médecin malgré lui, though it has an emphasis on theatrics over a faithful translation. It is a pure comedy and, unlike other plays by Fielding, has no serious moral lesson or purpose. The play was far more successful than The Covent-Garden Tragedy. Contemporary critics disagreed over whether the play was inferior to the original, but modern critics believed Fielding's version was equally impressive.

== Background ==
The Mock Doctor: or The Dumb Lady Cur'd was the replacement for The Covent-Garden Tragedy as the companion play to The Old Debauchees. The play is an Anglicised adaptation of Molière's Le Médecin malgré Lui and is contemporary to the translation by John Watts in the Select Comedies of Molière, even though there is no direct connection between Fielding and the translation. The play was first advertised in the 16 June 1732 Daily Post as being in rehearsal and first ran on 23 June 1732.

It was later revised by 16 November 1732, and both versions were successful. The play ran for a total of twenty-four nights that year and was revived even until the nineteenth century. The revised version was shown on 16 November 1732 as an author's benefit and shown on 30 November at the request of the king. It was published by John Watts on 11 July 1732 with a second edition published on 30 November 1732.

== Cast ==
- Gregory
- Dorcas
- Sir Jasper
- Charlotte
- Leander

== Plot ==
The basis of the plot is the story of Gregory's pretending to be a doctor. Gregory starts off as a simple woodcutter by trade, but his wife forces him to take on the role of doctor. He disguises himself as Dr Ragou, a Frenchman, and goes to treat Sir Jasper's daughter, Charlotte, who pretends to be unable to speak. For Charlotte this becomes her only recourse to avoid a marriage forced upon her by her father. Instead, she wants to marry a man named Leander. While treating Charlotte, Gregory's disguise is able to fool his wife and he begins to pursue her as the Frenchman. However, Dorcas is able to figure it out that it is her husband in the disguise.

== Themes ==
Unlike Fielding's other plays, there is no serious moral lesson or purpose in The Mock Doctor. Instead, it is a pure comedy and follows closely to Molière's structure with alterations to adjust the format of the play to an English setting. Likewise, the language is Fielding's and emphasis theatrics over a faithful translation.

== Sources ==
Although Fielding is in debt to Molière, he made the play his own. In terms of characters, the power of the husband figure is shifted to the wife figure, and there is a connection between Gregory and the real life John Misaubin, to whom Fielding dedicates The Mock Doctor. However, the wife and husband also resemble Fielding's previous characters, the Moderns. Fielding added nine songs to Molière's version and changed a few scenes around, including substituting unmarried characters for married characters during a sex scene. The original adaptation filled only one act but the revised version added distinct scene changes. The revised play also replaced four songs.

== Critical response ==
The 26 June 1732 Daily Post reported that the play was shown to "a full House, with great applause" and that "Le Medecin Malgre Lui, of Molier, from whence the Mock-Doctor is taken, bears the greatest reputation of any petite Piece in the French language; and many good Judges allow the English Farce is no way inferior to the Original." The Grub-Street Journal disagreed with the reporting and printed on 29 June and 20 July 1772 that Fielding performed a disservice to the original. The 24 August 1732 Grub-Street Journal stated that the play was favoured by audiences but gave all credit to Molière and the actors instead of to Fielding. Later, John Hill, a rival to Fielding, admitted in the 13 January 1752 London Daily Advertiser that the play defined the English farce.

Harold Pagliaro connects The Mock Doctor with The Covent-Garden Opera and says that they are able to make "its nominal subject subordinate to a different purpose: writing a funny play about something else." Robert Hume believes that "Fielding benefited greatly from taking over the well-crafted frame of Molière's play, but what he provided by way of adaptation and additions he handled with great skill." The Battestins argue that the play "in time became the standard of its kind, the light farce". Ronald Paulson attributes the success of this adaptation to Fielding's later adaptation of Molière's The Miser.
