= The Old Debauchees =

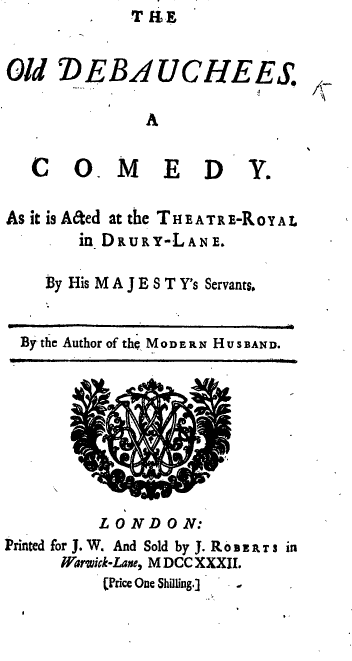
Titlepage to The Old Debauchees: a Comedy

The Old Debauchees, originally titled The Despairing Debauchee, is a play written by Henry Fielding. It premiered alongside The Covent-Garden Tragedy on 1 June 1732 at the Theatre Royal, Drury Lane, and was later revived as The Debauchees; or, The Jesuit Caught. The play recounts a Catholic priest's unsuccessful attempt to manipulate a man into seducing his own daughter.

Unlike The Covent-Garden Tragedy, The Old Debauchees was well received. The play explores morality and societal perceptions thereof, and, like Fielding's other play, Rape upon Rape, alludes to a real event. Contemporary critics were divided on the play's success, but modern critics suggest that its effectiveness lies primarily in its social commentary.

== Background ==
Both The Old Debauchees and The Covent-Garden Tragedy were written by 4 April 1732, when Fielding signed an agreement with John Watts to publish them for 30 guineas. The Old Debauchees, originally titled The Despairing Debauchee, premiered with The Covent-Garden Tragedy on 1 June 1732. The Daily Post reported on 2 June that both plays were well-received, but retracted the claim on 5 June, stating that only The Old Debauchees had garnered positive reception. The play ran for six nights, with one scheduled performance on 13 June cancelled. Subsequently, the play was paired with The Mock Doctor.

The play was revived in late 1745 as The Debauchees; or, The Jesuit Caught and ran 25 times during the season. Watts published this version, noting the revisions. It was revived to promote anti-Catholic sentiment during the disputes between the British government and the Stuarts during 1745 and 1746. The addition of "The Jesuit Caught" to the play's title reinforced its anti-Catholic.

== Cast ==
The play's cast included:

- Old Laroon
- Jourdain
- Young Laroon
- Isabel – Jourdain's daughter, played by Kitty Clive
- Father Martin

== Plot ==
Young Laroon intends to marry Isabel, but Father Martin manipulates Isabel's father, Jourdain, into seducing her. However, other characters, including both Laroons, attempt to manipulate Jourdain for their own purposes, disguising themselves as priests and exploiting his guilt to influence him. As Father Martin pursues Isabel, she discerns his intentions and sets her own trap. After catching and exposing his lust, Father Martin is set to be punished.

== Themes ==
Like Rape upon Rape, the title The Old Debauchees alludes to a real individual and his corrupt actions. The play is based on the October 1731 trial of Father Girard. The plot incorporates Fielding's anti-Catholic bias, common in English theatre at the time. However, his placement of anti-Catholic rhetoric in Old Laroon's speeches undermines the comedic effect, causing the sentiment to fall flat with audiences.

Fielding also uses the play to discuss morality and societal views on morality, exploring doubt, faith, and politics while addressing various aspects of society. Connections may exist within the play's commentary to George II's mistresses or Robert Walpole's relationship with Maria Skerritt and his wife's relationship with Lord Hervey. Tiffany Potter interprets the commentary as representing "the voice of a libertine mocking those who thoughtlessly accept the constraints of social decorum, gender roles, and sexual repression...combined with Fielding's own unorthodox behavior and frequent questioning of social doctrines at this time in his life, marks him to some degree as an advocate of the libertine tradition."

== Sources ==
The play is evidently based on Father Girard's trial for seducing Marie Catharine Cadière, a popular subject also portrayed in plays such as Father Girard the Sorcerer and The Wanton Jesuit. Girard, a Jesuit, was tried for using magic on Cadière. Fielding's account differs by portraying Cadière not as a victim but as intelligent enough to recognize Girard's plot.

== Critical response ==
The Daily Post wrote on 5 June 1732: "We are assured the Comedy call'd The Old Debauchees, did meet with universal Applause; but the Covent Garden Tragedy will be Acted no more, both the Author and the Actors being unwilling to continue any Piece contrary to the Opinion of the Town." The Grub-Street Journal reprinted this on 8 June and criticized The Covent-Garden Tragedy. On 16 June, the Daily Post reiterated the play's success, but the 29 June Grub-Street Journal countered that the play deteriorated by its third night. However, the 13 July 1732 Grub-Street Journal declared the play a success, crediting Theophilus Cibber's portrayal of Father Martin, while also complaining that Fielding's critique extended beyond Catholics.

According to Robert Hume, "The Old Debauchees is an unusual combination of farcical buffoonery and harsh invective, and not an effective one." Similarly, Potter notes that "The Old Debauchees has been critically dismissed since its initial appearance. Nonetheless, the drama is successful as a piece of social commentary that is both entertaining and enlightening." The Battestins describe the play as a "tasteless attempt to capitalize on the sensational case of Father Girard" but add that "Fielding was merely doing for his own theatre what others had already done". Harold Pagliaro points out that "For all its vitality, especially in its celebration of sexuality, in and out of marriage, and its farcical management of Father Martin, The Old Debauchees includes a dark element which its comic force controls only fleetingly."
