= Elizabeth Needham =

English procuress and brothel-keeper

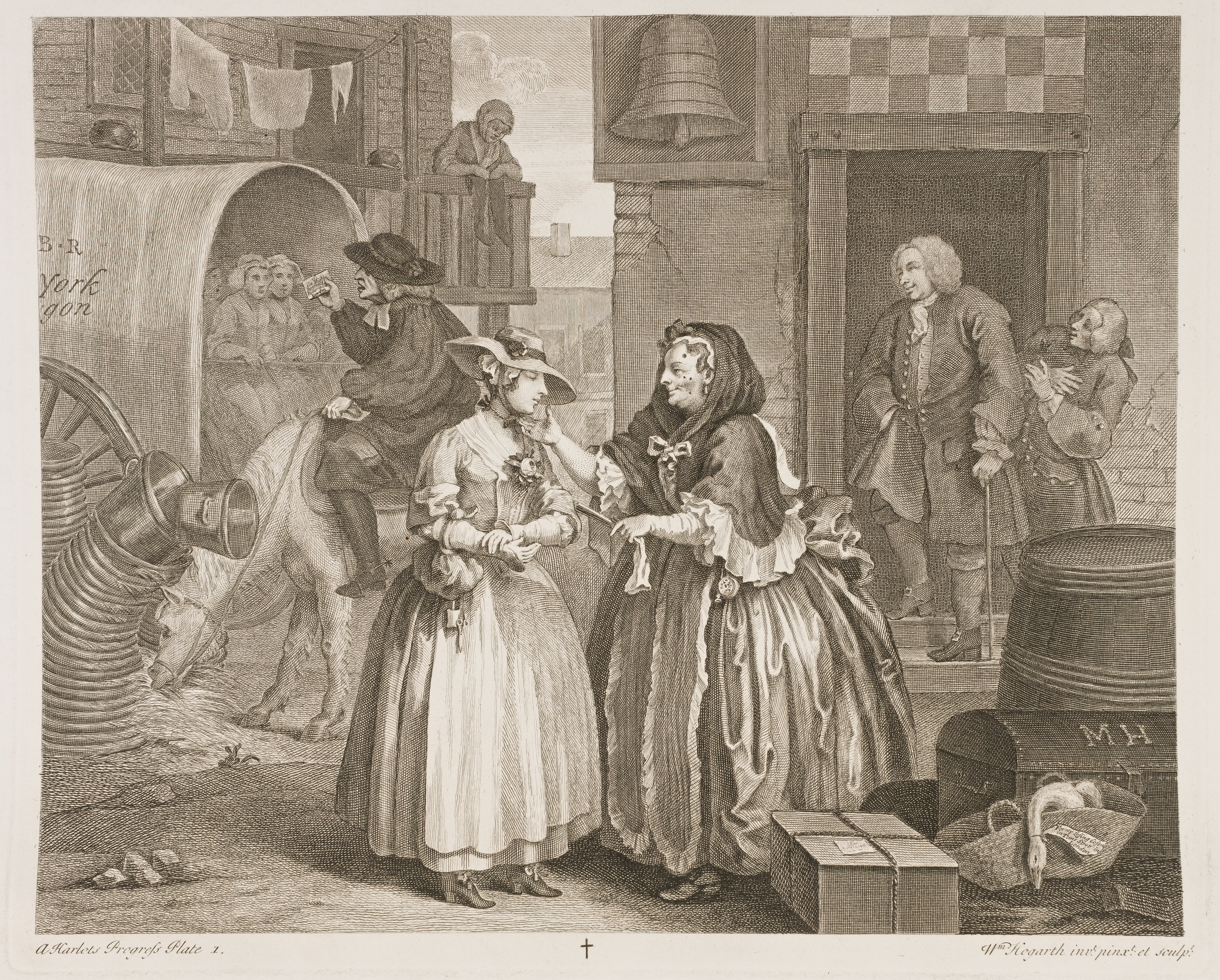
Elizabeth Needham (right foreground) as portrayed in William Hogarth's A Harlot's Progress

Elizabeth Needham (died 3 May 1731), also known as Mother Needham, was an English procuress and brothel-keeper of 18th-century London, who has been identified as the bawd greeting Moll Hackabout in the first plate of William Hogarth's series of satirical etchings A Harlot's Progress. Although Needham was notorious in London at the time, little is recorded of her life, and no genuine portraits of her survive.

Her house was the most exclusive in London and her customers came from the highest strata of fashionable society. She eventually ran afoul of the moral reformers of the day and died as a result of the severe treatment she received after being sentenced to stand in the pillory.

== Character ==
Nothing is known of Needham's early life, but by the time she was middle-aged she was renowned in London as the keeper of a brothel in Park Place, St. James. Her house was regarded as the most exclusive in London, superior to those of Covent Garden, even to that of the other notorious bawd of the time, Mother Wisebourne. She was said to still be attractive in middle-age. Hogarth described her as a "handsome old Procuress ... well dressed in silk", but mentions "patches on her face" and in his picture her face is seen to be pock-marked.

She went by a number of aliases: Bird, Howard, Blewitt and Trent are among those ascribed to her, although Mother Bird was also the name of another brothel-keeper who was committed to Newgate Prison with Needham in 1724.

Needham was apparently ruthless with the girls and women who worked for her. They were forced to hire their dresses from her, and, if they were unable to pay the exorbitant rentals, she would force them to take more customers or have them committed to debtors' prison until they met her demands, a scheme John Cleland's heroine falls prey to in Fanny Hill (1748). Once they were too old or too ill to attract customers, she would throw them out.

Needham procured her prostitutes from many sources including the houses of other brothel-keepers, the "Bails" in Covent Garden where homeless girls would sleep rough, Tom King's Coffee House, and from auctions. As depicted in Hogarth's picture, she particularly targeted girls and women fresh from the country. The essayist Richard Steele found her pitching to a newly arrived girl when he went to meet a wagon bringing him items from the countryside. He described her as "artful", and it seems that she was friendly and engaging with her potential employees, revealing her vicious character only when they were under her roof. In The Dunciad, Alexander Pope warns not to "... lard your words with Mother Needham's style".

Pope mentions her once more at the end of The Dunciad (1728), making reference to her foul mouth, and again, alongside other notorious madams of the day, in the last verses of his Coronation Epistle, which were suppressed in editions of the poem from 1769 until 1954:

For Want of you, we spend our random Wit on
The first we find with Needham, Brooks, or Briton.

Henry Fielding refers to her in his Pasquin (1736) and used Hogarth's representation of her as the model for Mother Punchbowl in The Covent Garden Tragedy (1732). Mary Davys's bawd in the Accomplish'd Rake of 1727 is called "Mother N-d-m" and targets young girls fresh from the countryside, just as Needham did.

== Customers ==
Chief among her customers were Francis Charteris and his cousin the Duke of Wharton—Charteris is lounging in the doorway behind Needham in Hogarth's picture. Ronald Paulson suggests that the model for Moll Hackabout in Hogarth's first scene is Ann Bond, who was lured by Needham and raped by Charteris. Charteris, already known as the "Rape-Master General", was convicted and sentenced to death as a result of the Bond rape, although he was later pardoned. Needham's name was not mentioned during the legal proceedings.

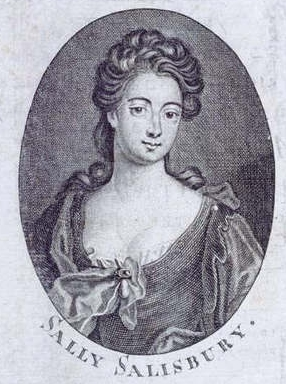
The connection with Sally Salisbury only served to heighten the reputation of Needham's house.

Needham may have introduced Charteris to Sally Salisbury around 1708. Salisbury was the pre-eminent prostitute of the day and was kept by Charteris for a short time as mistress at the beginning of her career. When her previous bawd, Mother Wisebourne, died in 1719, she became a member of Needham's household and brought with her a clientele from the highest ranks of society. Salisbury brought further fame to Needham's house by involving another of her girls in the theft of the Earl of Cardigan's clothes. The two women accompanied him to Newmarket where he became drunk, and after putting him to bed at an inn they stole his clothes and jewellery and returned to London. The Earl treated the matter as a joke.

Some idea of the reputation of Needham's house can be gathered from one of Joe Miller's Jests, which involves her asking her landlord to wait for his money until Parliament and the Convocation sit, at which point she will be able to pay him ten times over, and by a satirical premature obituary, which appeared in the London Journal. The obituary describes a will in which she distributes appropriate gifts to her famous clients: "a picture of Sodom and Gomorrah to indorsing D―n; an ounce of Mercuris Dulcis to Beau C―e, of St. Martin's Lane; her estate to the Duke of Wharton; her library to Ned C―; and a receipt to cure a clap to little Quibus". At the time, the figures mentioned would not have been spared their blushes by the omission of their full names, but identifying them now is guesswork.

Her well-connected clientele may have allowed her to escape arrest. Despite the popular notion that Sally Salisbury's 1723 stabbing of John Finch, the son of the Duchess of Winchelsea, had taken place in her house, it had actually occurred at the Three Tuns Tavern in Covent Garden, the first time Needham was raided was in 1724:

Yesterday morning the celebrated Mother Needham and Mother Bird, two eminent conservators of the Game of the Kingdom, were committed to Newgate; their houses being disturb'd the night before by the Constables, who disengaged the Gentlemen and Ladies to a great number, and carried them to the Round-House. This being the first time Mrs Needham ever received publick correction, since her being at the head of venal affairs in this town, 'tis thought will be the ruin of her household. Daily Journal, Tuesday 21 July 1724.

The constables had found "two women in bed with two men of distinction". The men were bound over, but the women were sent to Tothill Fields Bridewell to do hard labour. Needham's punishment is not recorded, but it appears that she was still incarcerated in September when her house burned down, killing one of the inhabitants, Captain Barbute, a French officer. In 1728, several of her girls were arrested, but she appears to have escaped punishment.

== Arrest, conviction and death ==
In late 1730, Sir John Gonson, a Justice of the Peace and fervent supporter of the Society for the Reformation of Manners, spurred on by the furore surrounding the Charteris rape case, began conducting raids on brothels all over London. By early 1731 he had arrived at St James, where some residents of Park Place reported "a Notorious Disorderly House in that Neighbourhood". In truth, Needham's house was hardly unknown, having served the upper echelons of society for years, but she was arrested by Gonson and committed to the Gatehouse by Justice Railton.

On 29 April 1731, Needham was convicted of keeping a disorderly house, fined one shilling, and sentenced to stand twice in the pillory, and "to find sureties for her good behaviour for 3 years". On 30 April she was taken to the pillory near Park Place to stand for the first time. Perhaps because of her connections, she was allowed to lie face down in front of the pillory and a number of guards were paid to protect her. Despite this she received such a pelting, that it was thought likely that she would die before her punishment was completed. The crowds that had gathered to see her pilloried were so large that one boy fell on an iron fencing rail while trying to get a better look, and was killed.

Needham was taken from the pillory alive. She died on 3 May 1731, the day before she was due to stand in the pillory for the second time, this time at New Palace Yard. With her last words she apparently expressed great fear at having to stand in the pillory again, after the severe punishment she had received the first time. The Grub Street Journal, the satirical journal allied with Alexander Pope and others of Hogarth's friends, sardonically reported that the populace "acted very ungratefully, considering how much she had done to oblige them". Her demise was celebrated in a mocking rhyme:

Ye Ladies of Drury, now weep
Your voices in howling now raise
For Old Mother Needham's laid deep
And bitter will be all your Days.
She who drest you in Sattins so fine
Who trained you up for the Game
Who Bail, on occasion would find
And keep you from Dolly (Note: Dolly was a cant term for hemp: to mill dolly was to beat hemp in Bridewell or another of the prisons, hence to be saved from Dolly meant avoiding prison. The Oxford English Dictionary says Dolly was used at the time for "A drab, slattern, useless woman." Both of the senses could be employed here.) and Shame
Now is laid low in her Grave...

Hogarth was still at work on A Harlot's Progress when she died, so she never saw herself immortalised. There were other madams ready to step into her shoes, but it was not until Mother Douglas took over the King's Head in Covent Garden in 1741 that a brothel reappeared with a reputation to match that of Needham.

== See also ==
- Damaris Page
- Elizabeth Cresswell
