= Carpenter's Coffee House =

Former coffee house in London, England

Coordinates: 51.511970°N 0.122800°W

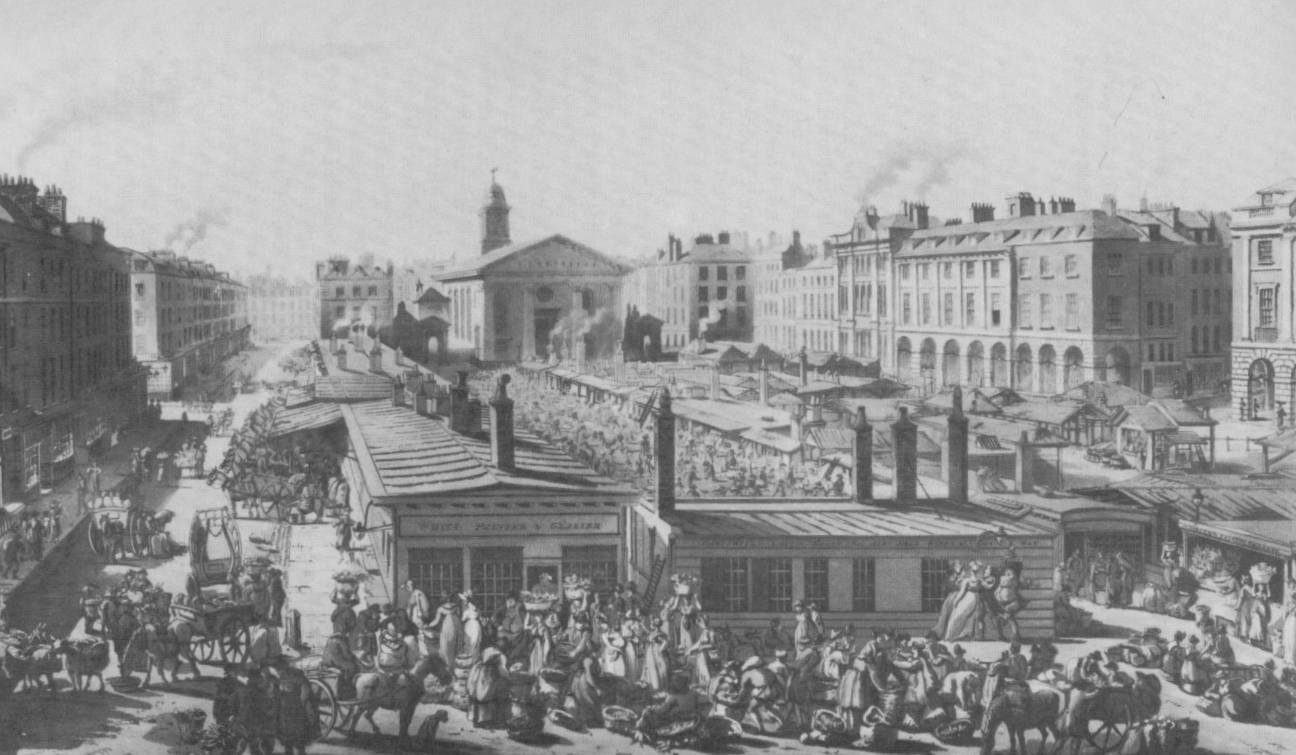
Carpenter's is the building with four chimneys in the foreground of this 19th-century view of Covent Garden

Carpenter's Coffee House (later known as "The Finish", "The Queen's Head" and "Jack's") was a coffee house in Covent Garden, London, established by George Carpenter some time around 1762.

== George Carpenter ==
Carpenter had been a strongman and then worked as a porter in Covent Garden. By 1745, he had established himself as a fruit salesman in the market, and by hard work had made himself comparatively wealthy.

He later became ill, and was unable to work for a considerable time. Without an income, he was forced to use his savings to provide for himself during his illness. He was reduced to pawning his possessions, but eventually recovered and managed to re-establish himself as a successful stall holder, finally becoming the lessee of the market in 1762. Leasing the market for a fee of £500 from the Duke of Bedford entitled Carpenter to collect rents of around £700 a year.

== History ==
Two of the shacks in the Great Piazza facing the Little Piazza (or hummums) were being used as a coffee house when Carpenter gained control of the market and he took these over, renamed them "Carpenter's Coffee House", and installed his parents as managers. Carpenter was uninterested in serving coffee to his customers, and the quality of the coffee was poor, William Hickey describing it in 1766 as "a spartan mixture difficult to ascertain the ingredients but which was served as coffee".

Carpenter's intention may have been that the establishment should serve as a rendezvous for prostitutes from the brothels that surrounded the piazza and their customers, much as Tom King's Coffee House had in previous decades. Beer and punch were also served, the beer brewed by Theodore Savage who boasted how many men the potent recipe had shown "the way home". By 1768 Carpenter's had become known by the nickname "The Finish" describing its role for those out for a night on the town; when all the other coffee houses and taverns were closed the revelers would make their way to Carpenter's to finish out the night, in Hickey's words "the last of those nocturnal Resorts for which Covent Garden was famous".

As the customers were mostly drunk and oblivious by the time they arrived, the cleanliness of the establishment was not high on the list of priorities. Rats abounded and it had a reputation as a dirty, disreputable place. Samuel Foote may have worked there before taking to the stage, and was reputed to have named the rats and fed them on the dregs of the beer.

The coffee house seems to have escaped the fire that destroyed many of the buildings of the Little Piazza in 1769.

Carpenter died around 1785, and the management of the coffee house passed to his barmaid Anne Crosdell (also known as Mrs. Gibson because she was living with John Gibson, a cook in the Bedford Arms opposite the coffee house). By 1788 it was being run by Elizabeth Butler, a former brothel-keeper, who had run a successful business in King Street, just off the Great Piazza. Though still known as "The Finish" it was also referred to as "The Queen's Head". Despite Butler's reputation as a cheerful generous hostess, the reputation of Carpenter's, if anything, had grown worse. Thieves and murderers used the establishment to lie in wait for their victims, robbing the drunken revelers of their money, watches and valuables, often assaulting them in the process and occasionally murdering them. At the beginning of the 19th century it had become a favorite haunt of boxers with many of the famous London pugilists of the time being regular customers. Butler continued to run the coffee house until around 1812; although she was still alive in 1825, by 1815 Ann Butler (whose relationship to Elizabeth is not known) was running the coffee house.

In 1825 Jack Rowbottom took over the lease and the building became known as "Jack's". Rowbottom did nothing to improve the reputation of the coffee house; under his tenure fights and disturbances were common, and Rowbottom was arrested so frequently as a result that it was remarked that "his Residence alternated between the Fleet and the King's Bench prisons".

The building was demolished in 1866.

== See also ==
- Society for the Reformation of Manners
