= John Finch (died 1763) =

British lawyer and politician

Member of the British House of Commons
- In office 1724–1747
- Preceded by: Thomas Watson-Wentworth
- Succeeded by: Brownlow Cecil
- Constituency: Higham Ferrers (1724-1741); Rutland (1741-1747)

Personal details
- Born: c. 1692
- Died: 12 February 1763 (aged c. 71)
- Spouse: Elizabeth Younger
- Children: 1 daughter
- Parent(s): Daniel Finch; Anne Hatton

John Finch (c. 1692 – 12 February 1763) of Bushey, Hertfordshire, was a British lawyer and politician who sat in the House of Commons for 23 years from 1724 to 1747.

== Early life ==
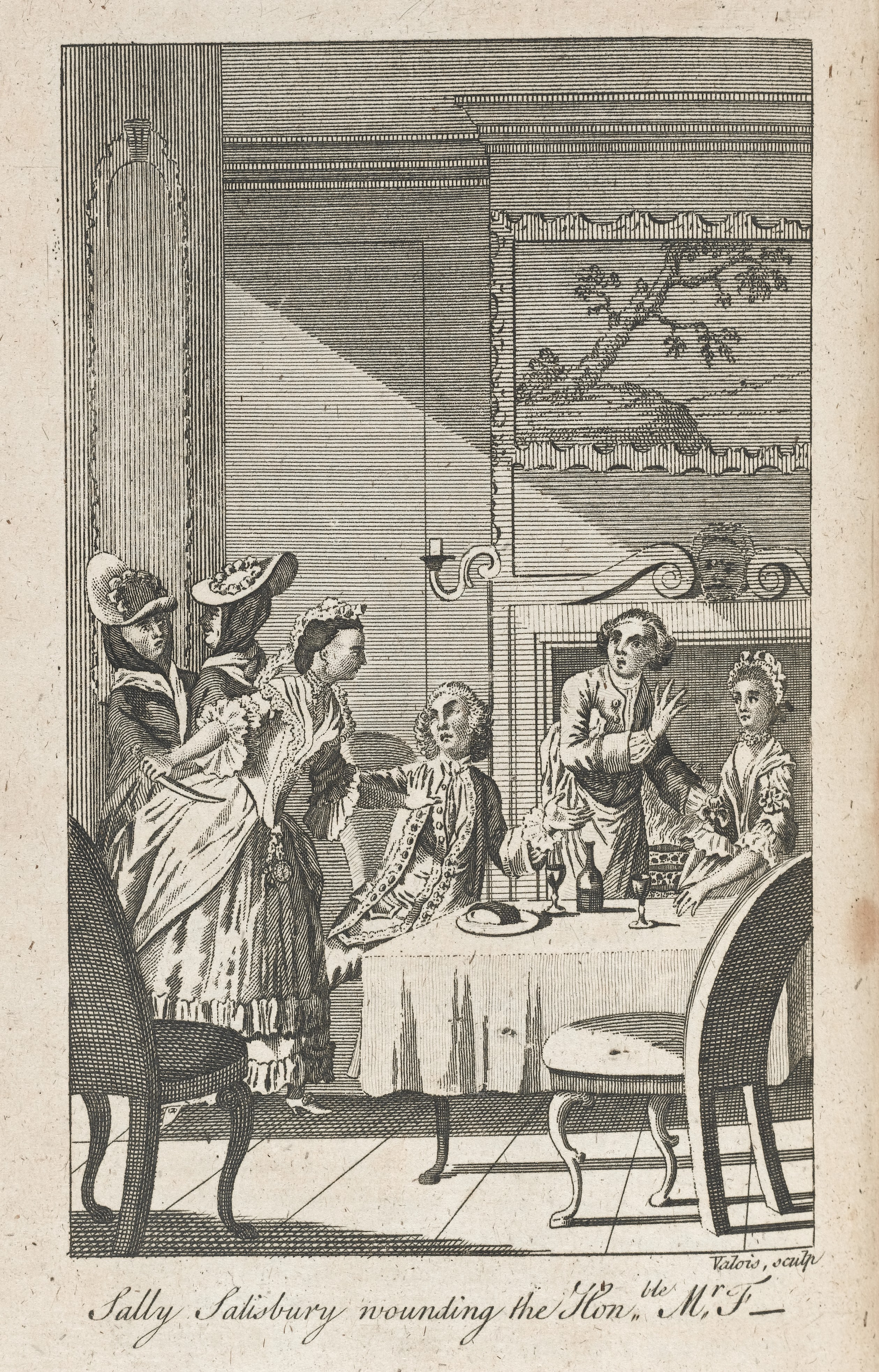
Sally Salisbury wounding the Honourable Mr F----

Finch was the third son of Daniel Finch and his second wife Anne Hatton, daughter of Christopher Hatton. He was educated at Eton College from 1706 to 1707 and matriculated at Christ Church, Oxford on 26 January 1708, aged 15. In 1711, he was admitted at Inner Temple, and was called to the bar in 1719.

He became known as ‘him who was stabbed by Sally Salisbury’ after an incident on the night of 18 December 1722, when a prostitute, Sally Pridden (known as Salisbury), stabbed him at the Three Tuns tavern in Chandos Street, apparently in a fit of passion during an argument over theatre tickets. She was found guilty of assault and wounding, without intent to kill, and was fined and sent to Newgate prison where she died in 1724.

He later married the actress Elizabeth Younger after she had an illegitimate daughter by him.

== Career ==
Finch stood unsuccessfully at a by-election on 1 June 1723 at Maidstone on the interest of his cousin, Heneage Finch whose brother, another John Finch was a sitting member. He was elected as Member of Parliament for Higham Ferrers on the interest of his brother-in-law, Thomas Watson-Wentworth at a by-election on 20 January 1724. He was solicitor general to the Prince of Wales from 1726 to 1727 and became King's Counsel (KC) in 1727 when the Prince became King George II. At the 1727 general election, he was returned unopposed for Higham Ferrers. In Parliament he followed his brother Lord Finch. He seconding the Address in 1729 and joined his brother in opposition in 1730. He was again returned unopposed at the 1734. He was Treasure of his Inn in 1739. At the 1741 general election he made way for his brother Henry at Higham Ferrers, and transferred to Rutland where he was returned unopposed as MP with the support of his elder brother, now Lord Winchilsea. After Walpole's fall in 1742, he and his brothers supported the Government and in 1746 he was classed as one of Granville's followers. Lord Winchilsea intended to put him up for Rutland again at the 1747 general election but realised he had little chance of success. Finch never stood for Parliament again.

== Death and legacy ==
Finch died on 12 February 1763, leaving a daughter born before marriage, whose presentation at court in 1747 created controversy in the family. As well as Lord Finch and Henry, his brothers Edward and William Finch were also Members of Parliament.

== Ancestry ==
Ancestors of John Finch (died 1763)

Heneage Finch
Heneage Finch
Frances Bell
Daniel Finch
Elizabeth Harvey
John Finch
Christopher Hatton
Christopher Hatton
Elizabeth Montagu
Anne Hatton
Cecilia Tufton

Parliament of Great Britain
Preceded by Thomas Watson-Wentworth	Member of Parliament for Higham Ferrers; 1724–1741	Succeeded by Henry Finch
Preceded by James Noel; Thomas Noel	Member of Parliament for Rutland; 1741–1747; With: James Noel	Succeeded by James Noel; Brownlow Cecil
