= Sally Salisbury =

English prostitute

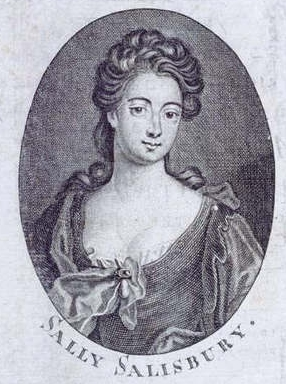
- Engraving of Sally Salisbury from the Authentic Memoirs of the Life, Intrigues and Adventures of the Celebrated Sally Salisbury (1723)
- Born: Sarah Pridden c. 1690; London, England
- Died: 1724 (aged 33–34); Newgate Prison, London, England
- Other name: Sarah Priddon
- Occupation: Prostitute
- Criminal information
- Status: Died in prison
- Conviction: Violent assault
- Penalty: 1 year in prison

Sarah Pridden (c. 1692 – 1724), commonly known as Sally Salisbury, was a celebrated prostitute in early 18th-century London. She was the lover of many notable members of society, and socialised with many others.

In 1722 she stabbed and wounded a client, the politician John Finch, who was a son of Daniel Finch, 2nd Earl of Nottingham and Anne Finch, Countess of Nottingham. She was found guilty of assault, but not guilty of attempted murder. Salisbury was sentenced to one year's imprisonment. She was sent to Newgate Prison to serve her sentence but died in prison after only nine months.

== Biography ==
She was born around 1690–1692 and given the name Sarah Pridden. Her father was a bricklayer. At the age of nine, Salisbury was apprenticed to a seamstress in Aldgate. After losing a valuable piece of lace, Salisbury ran away and took to life on the streets of the slum district of St Giles. Here she turned to various forms of street trading. She became well known in London as "the beautiful little wench who sells pamphlets to the schoolboys and apprentices...in Pope's Head Alley in the City of London". Her pamphlet sales were merely a sideline to her more lucrative trade: charging the boys half a crown for an hour of her time.

The notorious rake Colonel Francis Charteris made her his mistress, but abandoned her c. 1704, when she was 14 years old. Following her abandonment, Salisbury was taken in by the bawd, Mother Wisebourne, whose house in Covent Garden was among the most exclusive and expensive brothels of the time. She adopted the surname Salisbury from the name of one of her lovers. After Wisebourne's death, Salisbury moved on to the house of Mother Needham in Park Place.

=== Celebrity prostitute ===
Salisbury was celebrated for her beauty and wit, and consequently attracted many aristocratic customers. The Secretary of State for the Northern Department (1710–1713) and Secretary of State for the Southern Department (1713–1714), Viscount Bolingbroke was a great admirer of Salisbury, willing to pay "the highest price for the greatest pleasure". She boasted that she had "at least half a score" of lords as clients. The Duke of Richmond, the poet and diplomat Matthew Prior, and Nell Gwyn's son, the Duke of St Albans all patronised her, and even the future George II was rumoured to have been amongst her lovers.

She spent time in Marshalsea and Bridewell prisons for minor offences and debt. After a riot at Wisebourne's house in 1713, Salisbury was sent to Newgate Prison. She was released by Judge Blagney, who had become infatuated with her.

=== Stabbing ===
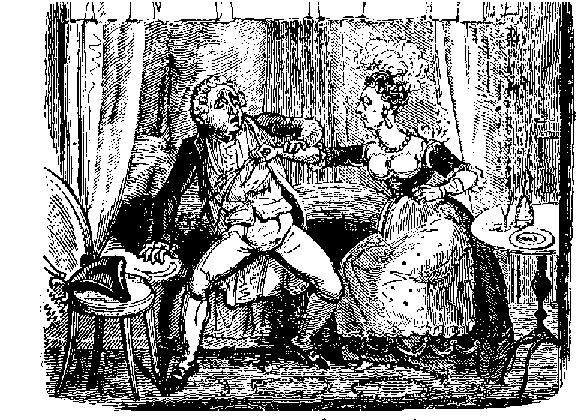
18th century illustration of Salisbury stabbing Finch.

The stabbing took place as the result of an argument over some opera tickets that a customer had given to Sally's sister instead of Sally. The customer was the politician John Finch, a son of Daniel Finch, 2nd Earl of Nottingham and Anne Finch, Countess of Nottingham. Finch was also a brother to Daniel Finch, 8th Earl of Winchilsea. During the argument in the Three Tuns Tavern in Chandos Street, Covent Garden, Finch and Salisbury both became angry. Salisbury snatched up the knife she had been given with her meal and stabbed Finch in the chest. She was apparently immediately remorseful, and called for a surgeon to attend Finch. Finch was gravely ill for some time, but forgave Salisbury on the spot. When he later recovered, he wished to visit her in prison to reiterate his forgiveness.

The incident was the talk of the town, as Salisbury was a celebrity in London and her every move was reported. Lady Mary Wortley Montagu wrote to Lady Frances Pierrepont, the exiled Countess of Mar (wife of John Erskine, Earl of Mar) in Paris of the gossip a few days after the event:

The freshest news in town is the fatal accident happened three nights ago to a very pretty young fellow, brother to Lord Finch, who was drinking with a dearly beloved drab, whom you may have heard of by the name of Sally Salisbury. In a jealous pique she stabbed him to the heart with a knife. He fell down dead immediately, but a surgeon being called for, and the knife drawn out of his body, he opened his eyes, and his first words were to beg her to be friends with him, and kissed her. She has since stayed by his bedside till last night, when he begged her to fly, for he thought he could not live; she has taken his advice and perhaps will honour you with her residence in Paris.

— Lady Mary Wortley Montagu – c. 25 December 1722

=== Trial and imprisonment ===
Salisbury was charged with violent assault and tried at the Old Bailey on 24 April 1723. Her lawyer claimed that the act had not been premeditated, and that Mr. Finch's forgiveness should count in her favour. The defence also tried to argue that Sally had acted to defend her sister from Mr. Finch's dishonorable amorous intentions, rather than from jealousy. The prosecution mocked her reputation and claimed that Finch's forgiveness showed only his amiable character and offered nothing in the way of mitigation. The jury found her guilty of assaulting and wounding Finch, but acquitted her of intent to murder. She was sentenced to pay a fine of 100 pounds, a year's imprisonment, and to find sureties for her behaviour for two years.

Salisbury's esteemed patrons did not abandon her: she received visitors while in prison and awaiting trial. The courtroom was packed with notables of London society during the trial. After she was taken to Newgate, she continued to receive visitors, who brought her luxury goods and made sure that she was comfortable during her imprisonment. After serving nine months of her sentence, she died of "brain fever brought on by debauch", almost certainly syphilis, and was buried in the churchyard of St Andrew Holborn.

== Legacy ==
She was the subject of a number of biographies, among them the anonymous The Genuine History of Mrs. Sarah Pridden, usually called Sally Salisbury, and Her Gallants, and Captain Charles Walker's Authentic Memoirs of the Life, Intrigues and Adventures of the Celebrated Sally Salisbury, both from 1723, as well as receiving mention in César de Saussure's A Foreign View of England.

She is a possible inspiration for the harlot Moll Hackabout, in William Hogarth's A Harlot's Progress: her lover Charteris features in the series and, like Moll, Salisbury had spent time in Bridewell. She was thought to be the satirical subject of the song Sally in Our Alley until the author, Henry Carey, claimed he had not heard of her when he wrote it.
