= Richard Rock =

Medical doctor (d. 1777)

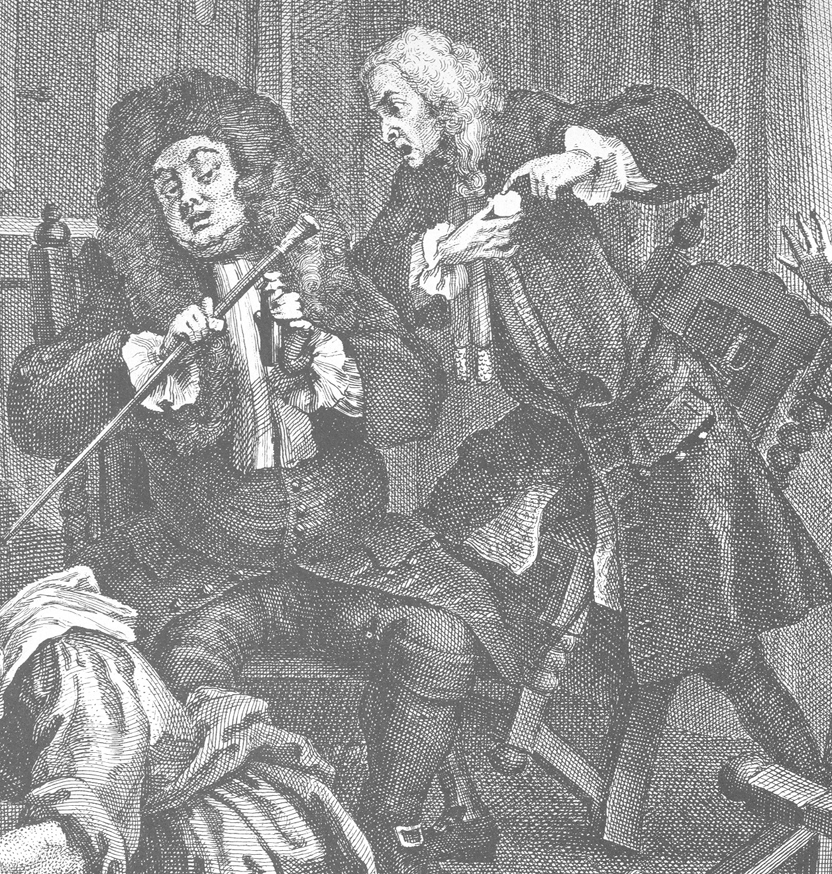
Richard Rock (left) argues with Dr. John Misaubin in William Hogarth's 1732 A Harlot's Progress while his patient dies of venereal disease.

Richard Rock (1690? – November 1777) was a well-known medical doctor in eighteenth-century London. Originally from Hamburg, he was depicted by William Hogarth in the fifth scene of his 1731/2 satirical and moralistic series, A Harlot's Progress, where he stands in dispute with notable French doctor John Misaubin beside the dying body of their patient, Moll Hackabout. The contrast between Rock (German, short and fat) and Misaubin (French, tall and gaunt) is intentional. Misaubin is easily recognised by his notably tall and thin appearance, but the second doctor was harder to identify with certainty, so Hogarth added his name on a slip of paper on the stool to the lower right of the scene in later printings.

Hogarth also included Rock in his 1738 engraving Morning, the first of series entitled The Four Times of the Day, selling his medicines in Covent Garden. Rock was known for selling a pill for venereal disease.

Oliver Goldsmith discusses Rock and his physical appearance in Letter LXVIII of his 1760 work The Citizen of the World.
