= Rape upon Rape =

Play by Henry Fielding

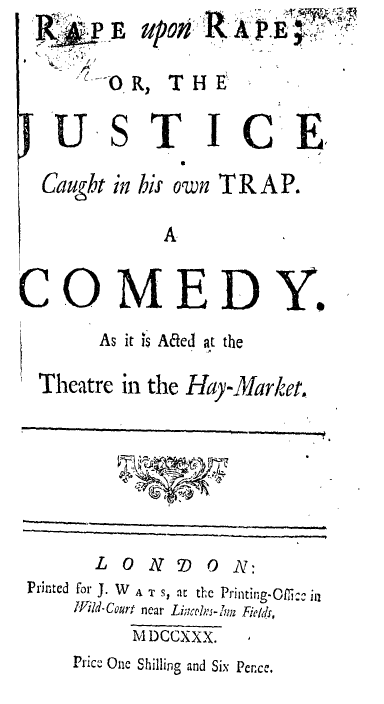
Titlepage to Rape upon Rape: or, The Justice Caught in His Own Trap

Rape upon Rape; or, The Justice Caught in his own Trap, also known as The Coffee-House Politician, is a play by Henry Fielding. It was first performed at the Haymarket Theatre on 23 June 1730. The play is a love comedy that depicts the corruption rampant in politics and in the justice system. When two characters are accused of rape, they deal with the corrupt judge in separate manners. Though the play was influenced by the rape case of Colonel Francis Charteris, it used "rape" as an allegory to describe all abuses of freedom, as well as the corruption of power, though it was meant in a comedic, farcical manner.

The play was not as successful as Fielding's Tom Thumb, which ran alongside Rape upon Rape. The play allowed Fielding to express his political views through comedy. Critics have both praised and critiqued the play, but they generally agree that the humour is unsuitable because it is "indelicate". Attempted adaptations of the play, including a musical and a film named after the play, have also been relatively unsuccessful.

== Background ==
Rape upon Rape was a five-act comedic play that was written early 1730. It was advertised to start on 15 June 1730, but, after a delay, it first ran on 23 June 1730 at the Little Theatre for eight nights until 21 July 1730. It was originally shown at the Haymarket theatre without a companion play. However, it was later shown with Tom Thumb on 1 July 1730 and with Jack the Giant Killer on 10 July 1730. The play was shown four more times at the Lincoln's Inn Fields theatre during that December under a new title, The Coffee-House Politician. The first printing of the play coincided with its opening night, 23 June 1730.

It was later altered, retitled The Coffee-House Politician, and featured at Lincoln's Inn Fields during the autumn. There is little information known as to why Fielding retitled the play, although Cross and Dudden both speculate that it was based on objections to the title. The play was advertised on 3 and 4 December 1730 Daily Post as a revised version, but there are no surviving manuscripts reflecting any major revisions to the play. If the play was altered by Fielding, then the changes would exist within the humour that would have become outdated. It is known that another act was added to the play, titled The Battle of the Poets, on 30 November 1730, but its author is unknown. Fielding did not like the addition and made it clear in an announcement about the play's production in the 30 November 1730 Daily Journal. During the 20th century, the play was turned into a musical titled Lock Up Your Daughters (1959), enjoying success, and the original play was later performed for 20 nights at the Soho Rep Theatre during 1983.

Fielding's original title may well allude to the vogue for 'she tragedies' popular from the late seventeenth into the eighteenth century which focus upon the exploitation of female suffering.

== Cast ==
Cast according to original printed billing:

- Justice Squeezum – played by Mr. Hippisley
- Justice Worthy – played by Mr. Ogden
- Mrs. Squeezum – played by Mrs. Bullock
- Politic – Father of Hilaret, played by Mr. Chapman
- Sotmore – played by Mr. Hulett
- Hilaret – played by Mrs. Younger
- Constant – played by Mr. Milward
- Cloris – Hilaret's maid, played by Mrs. Stevens
- Ramble – played by Mr. Walker
- Isabella – played by Mrs. Boheme
- Dabble – played by Mr. Ray
- Quill – played by Mr. H. Bullock
- Staff – played by Mr. Hall
- Mrs. Staff – played by Mrs. Kilby
- Porer – played by Mr. Maclean
- Faithful – played by Mr. Houghton
- Other characters include Brazencourt, Fireball, three Assistants, Evidences, Watch, and others
- Prologue spoken by Mr. Milward
- Epilogue spoken by Mrs. Younger

The revised edition scheduled Anthony Boheme to play Politick and John Hippisley to play Squeezum. Boheme had to leave the play due to illness and was replaced by Thomas Chapman. Chapman's original part was filled by William Milward. Elizabeth Younger replaced Mrs Boheme as Hilaret and Mrs Boheme was given the part of Isabella instead. This action was most likely due to Boheme's illness. Charles Macklin, playing Porer and Brazencourt, met with success and ended up stealing parts of the show.

== Plot ==
The play is begun with a prologue that describes the origins of the heroic Muse who uses satire to deal with those who are villains. However, she is not limited to satire, and the heroic Muse is said to provoke individuals towards the destruction of evil in general.

After this set up, Fielding introduces a traditional comedic love plot in which Hilaret contemplates running off and marrying Constant. Her father, Politic, stops her from running off with Constant to argue about the role of private and public concerns in regards to love. Their discussion serves as a model for the actions surrounding Justice Squeezum and Justice Worthy, particularly Justice Squeezum's corruption when it comes to the judicial system, and the play promotes the need for virtue within public and private settings.

As the plot progresses, Hilaret is set upon by Ramble, which provokes her to cry out "rape". During this time, Constant, in an attempt to help a woman, is also accused of rape. They are taken before Justice Squeezum, who reveals his abuses of the judicial system. Hilaret comically forms a plot to catch the corrupt Justice Squeezum; he is able to overcome it because Fielding promotes dealing with corruption only through legal means, which Hilaret fails to do when she resorts to relying on falsified evidence. Although Justice Squeezum and his corrupt nature almost overcomes the other characters, the manner in which this happens is done in a farcical way to provoke laughter.

== Themes ==
Although the play deals with political themes, politics is not the play's purpose, nor is a critique of politics. The play has obvious political connections as title refers to the rape case of Colonel Francis Charteris, dubbed "Rapemaster General of Great Britain". However, the play is more focused on morality and there is no direct correlation between any of the characters and Charteris. Of course, the contemporary audiences would have known that there was a connection, as Bertrand Goldgar argues, "there can be little doubt that the audiences at the Haymarket in June would have immediately connected Fielding's Rape upon Rape with the Charteris affair." However, the use of "rape" in the play is more than just forced sexual intercourse; it is used to describe all abuses of freedom and the corruption of power.

The title, without needing to actually include Charteris, allows for the play to serve as a critique of abuses of power and immorality. Justice Squeezum represents the flaws of society, while Justice Worthy represents England as it tries to deal with the various problems. The play serves as a way for Fielding to express his own views about society in his comedy. Fielding furthered this end by using Aristophanes as a model, and the theatre became his means to encouraging social change. However, the play is still a comedy, and the social agenda stands besides romantic intrigue and traditional comedic situations. There is an emphasis on legal matters, and the final words deal with crime. As such, the theatre serves as a kind of courtroom, and the characters are judged throughout the play with Fielding serving as a sort of prosecutor.

== Sources ==
The character of Politick is connected to a tradition of politically involved individuals that frequent coffee-houses. These include the character Upholsterer featured in the Tatler and Beaver the Haberdasher from the Spectator. The type of character also appeared in multiple plays that Fielding would have known, including: Toby Clincher in Sir Harry Wildair (1701) and Postscript in The Generous Husband: or, The Coffee-House Politician (1711). The general idea behind Politick are an incarnation of the news of the day and his discussions involve many events that were contemporaneous with the play. Real newspapers and their reports are mocked throughout.

Other characters are likewise connected to a traditional type within Restoration literature; Squeezum is related to the corrupt politician Quorum in Charles Coffey's The Beggar's Wedding (1729) or the Justice of the Peace in Coffey's The Female Parson (1730). Other works use the same character type, including Butler's Hudibras, Thomas Baker's The Humour of the Age (1701), Swift's Project for the Advancement of Religion, and the Reformation of Manners (1709), and Christopher Bullock's The Per-Juror (1717). Of course, Fielding's own works, including The Author's Farce, The Old Debauchees, and The Covent-Garden Tragedy includes the character type. However, as Thomas Lockwood points out, "These earlier stage justices are precedents more than sources, as the scope and development of the Squeezum character are beyond anything to be found in these other examples."

== Influence ==
Later works, including Arthur Murphy's The Upholster, or What News? (1758) and William Hodson's The Adventures of a Night (1783), borrowed from the play and met with mixed results. The play was also transformed by Bernard Miles into the musical Lock up your Daughters (1959). The show was performed at the Mermaid Theatre on 28 May 1959 and lasted for 330 shows. It was shown in Boston, New Haven, and Toronto in 1960, Melbourne in 1961, again at the Mermaid Theatre in 1962, and later Pasadena and Fort Lauderdale in 1968 and at East Haddam and the West End in 1969. A film version was made in 1969, but the movie has little connection to the original play.

In the Soviet Union, the play "The Coffee-House Politician, or The Justice Caught in his own Trap" was staged at the Satire Theatre in 1954 and later recorded as a radio play.

== Critical response ==
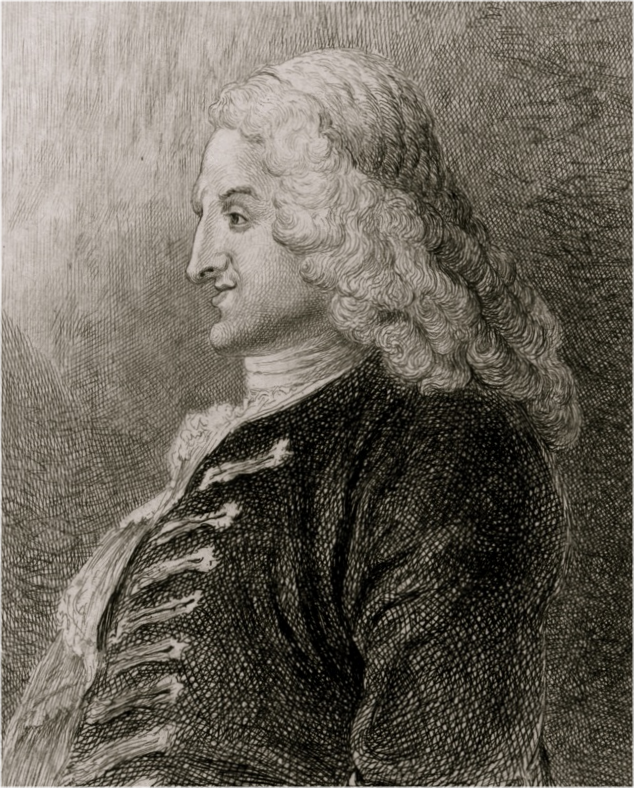
Fielding (1740 portrait)

The original edition did not experience the same draw as Fielding's Tom Thumb. However, none of the other plays at the Little Theatre were able to compete with its success. The revised edition was not a success and made very little. There are few surviving mentions of the play which include Arthur Murphy's comment in the Gray's-Inn Journall (1754) that scenes can be stolen from Rape upon Rape because no one would notice the similarity since the play was no longer performed. In Murphy's 1762 edition of Fielding's Works, he praises the play. However, he is the only one to talk about the play until the 19th century. John Genest praised it but adds, "the humour is low and [...] not very decent". Lawrence also praised aspects of the play but believed that no one could have liked the play because it was "too gross and too indelicate for the audiences even of that tolerant age". E. P. Whipple, in an 1849 review of Roscoe's biography of Fielding, declared that Murphy would have to be drunk to have actually appreciated the play. During the 20th-century, Dobson found little to praise within the play and Cross followed in suit. F. Homes Dudden characterised the play as "a coarse play, modelled on the lines of the Jonsonian 'comedy of humours'. Its chief interest lies in the portrayal of two characters, both rather heavily exaggerated.
