= Coffin plate =

Adornment

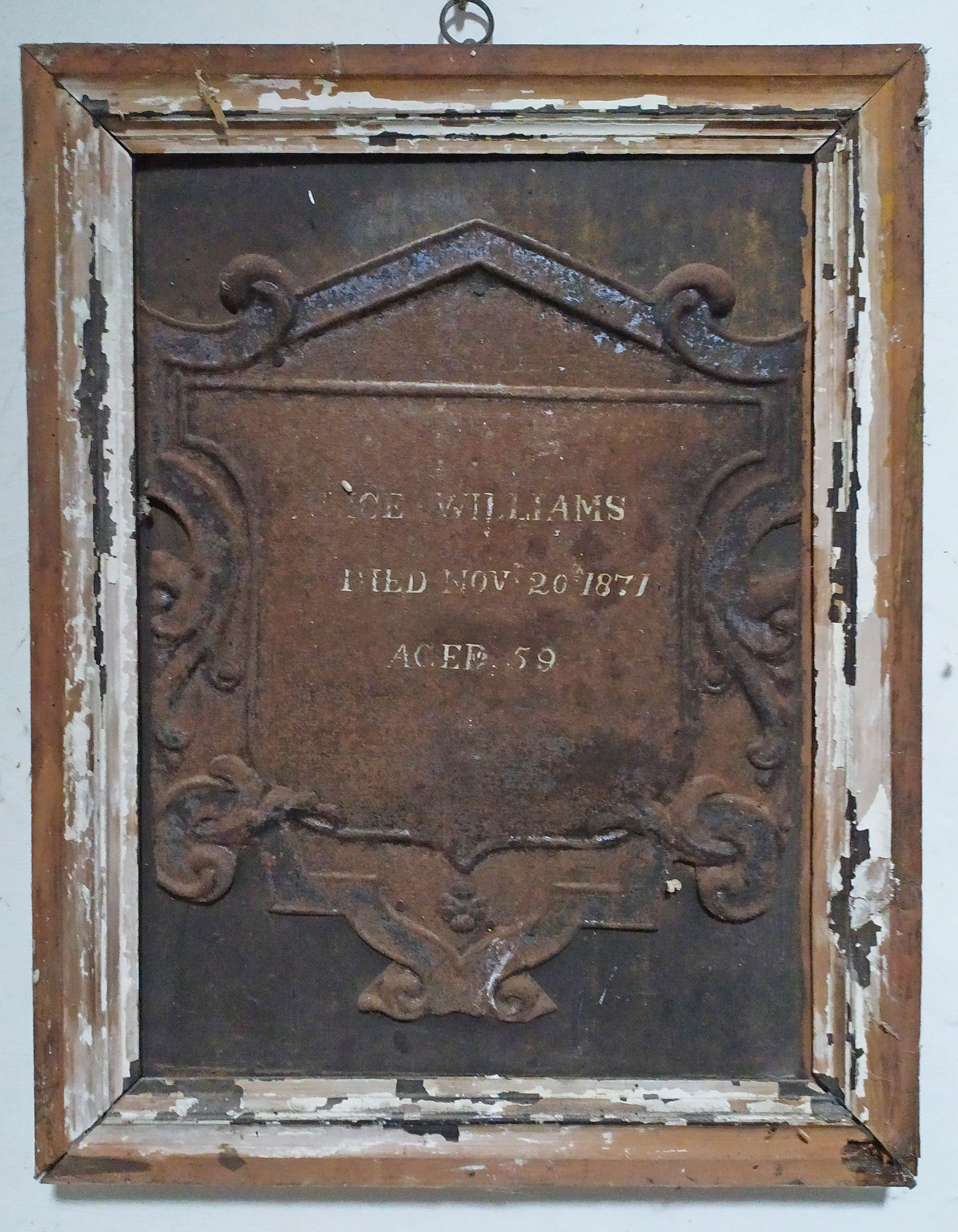
Coffin plate at St Beuno's, Penmorfa, Gwynedd, Wales

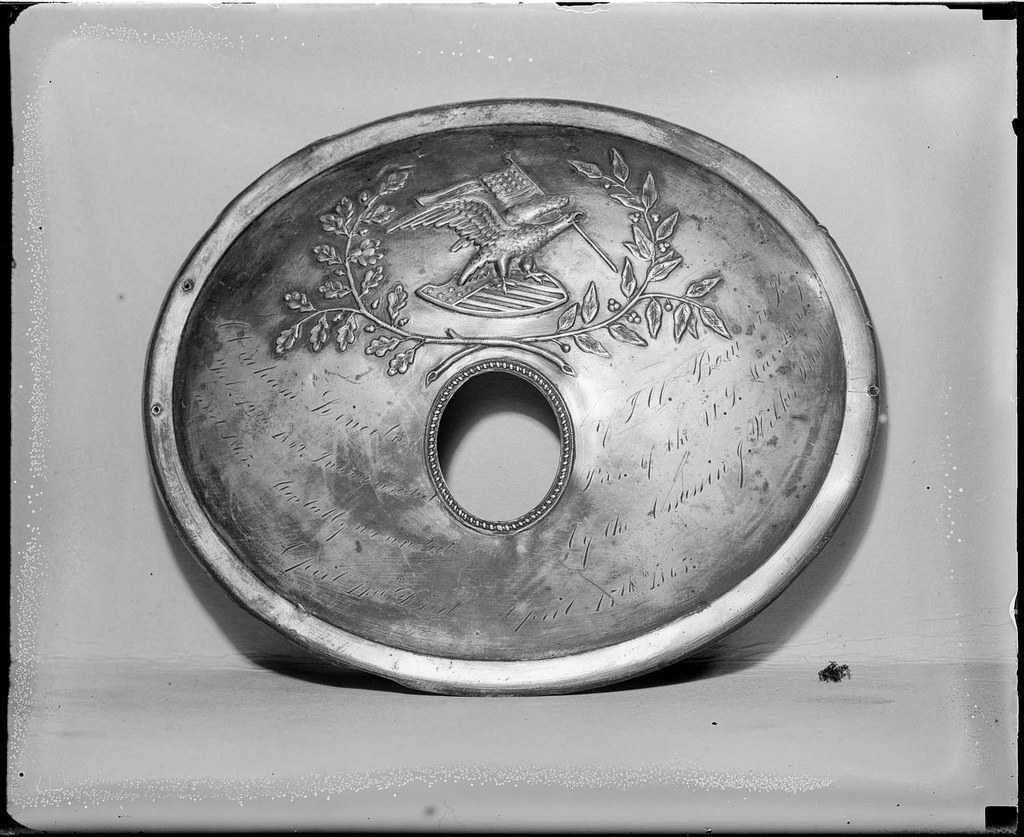
Abraham Lincoln's coffin plate

Coffin plates are decorative adornments attached to a coffin that can contain various inscriptions like the name and death date of the deceased or a simple terms of endearment.

They are usually made of a soft metal like lead, pewter, silver, brass, copper or tin. The different metals reflect the different functions of the plates, or the status and wealth of the deceased. For a basic funeral, a simple lead plate would be lettered with the name, date of death and often the age of the departed, and nailed to the lid of a wooden coffin but high status people could afford a plate of a more expensive metal and elaborate design.

Coffin plates go back at least as far as the 17th century and were reserved for people of wealth. Through the centuries, more people were able to afford the luxury of a coffin plate and with the Industrial Revolution, by the mid-19th century, the cost of the plates decreased so much that almost every family could afford to have one put on the coffin of their loved ones.

When coffin plates began increasing in popularity, the practice of removing the plates from the coffin before burial became the trend as they were often removed by the loved ones to be kept as mementos of the deceased. This practice peaked in the late 19th century.

In north-west Wales, coffin plates were displayed inside churches. An anonymous visitor to Dolgellau in 1841 noted that 'It is rather curious to see the innumerable coffin plates which are here invariably removed from the coffins and suspended in the church like escutcheons.' They were also seen in Tywyn, Merionethshire in 1866 and Beddgelert, Carnarvonshire Examples may be seen on the walls of St Beuno's, Penmorfa and St Cynhaearn's, Ynyscynhaearn, both under the care of the Friends of Friendless Churches.

In the UK and Australia coffin name plates are legally required (whether for burial and cremation) as a means of identifying the deceased.
