= John Gonson =

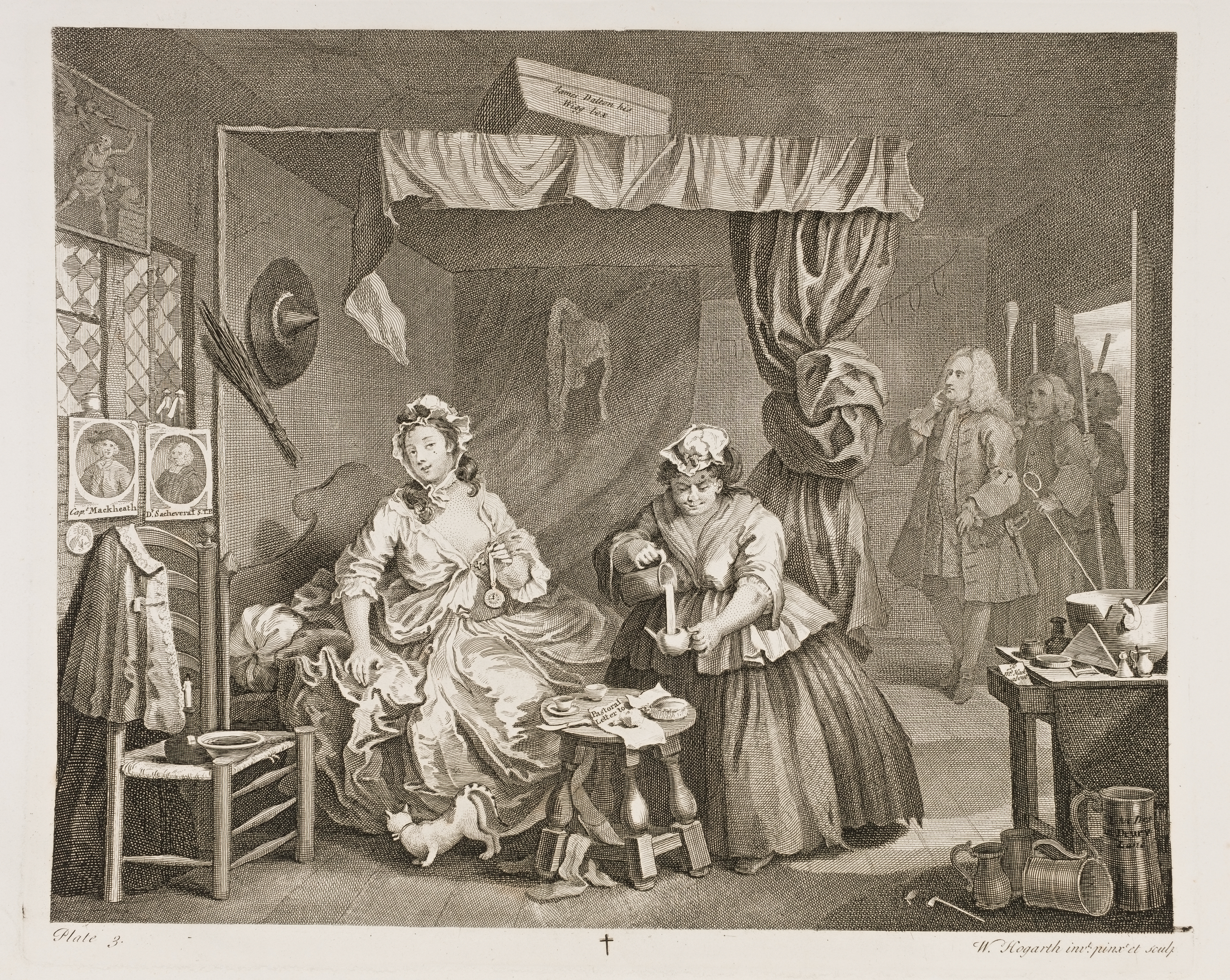
Plate 3 of A Harlot's Progress - Gonson and bailiffs raid the premises of protagonist, Moll Hackabout.

Sir John Gonson (died 1765) was an English judge for nearly 50 years in the early 18th century, serving as a Justice of the Peace and Chairman of the Quarter Sessions for the City of Westminster. Gonson was a supporter of the Society for the Reformation of Manners, and was noted for his enthusiasm for raiding brothels and for passing harsh sentences.

Gonson appears in contemporary court reports and newspaper articles, but is best known for having been depicted twice in A Harlot's Progress, William Hogarth's series of paintings from 1731 and subsequent engravings from 1732. Gonson first appears in plate 3, leading three armed bailiffs into the boudoir of the protagonist, Moll Hackabout. The character of Moll is based on a real-life prostitute, Kate Hackabout, who was apprehended by Gonson in 1730 and sentenced to hard labour for keeping a disorderly house. Gonson appears again in plate 4, shown hanging from the gallows in graffiti, while Moll beats hemp in Bridewell Prison.

Gonson was mentioned twice in Satire IV of Alexander Pope's Satires of John Donne, in Essay on Man, mentioning "the storm of Gonson's lungs" and "Peace, fools, or Gonson will for Papists seize you, If once he catch you at your Jesu! Jesu!". He has been called the scourge of Gin Lane or of Drury Lane, and wrote, in 1728,

In hot Tempers, it lets loose the Tongue to all the Indecencies and Rudeness of the most provoking Language, as well as the most hellish Oaths and Curses, and is frequently followed by Quarrels and Fightings, and sometimes has been the Cause of Murder.

Gonson not only used the rod of the law to fight what he saw as the evils of immorality in London. He is listed as a founding governor of the Foundling Hospital in that charity's royal charter of 1739. The first effort of its kind in the country, the Foundling Hospital was a home for abandoned children, many of them children of prostitutes. Hogarth was also a governor of the Foundling Hospital from its foundation.

Contemporary newspapers regularly reported his Westminster prosecutions under the “gin” laws: the Weekly News and Register covered Gonson’s cases on 3 July 1729, 4 September 1730, and 30 January 1731.
