= A Harlot's Progress =

Series of paintings and engravings by William Hogarth

A Harlot's Progress (also known as The Harlot's Progress) is a series of six paintings (1731, now destroyed) and engravings (1732) by the English artist William Hogarth. The series shows the story of a young woman, M. (Moll or Mary) Hackabout, who arrives in London from the country and becomes a prostitute. The series was developed from the third image. After painting a prostitute in her boudoir in a garret on Drury Lane, Hogarth struck upon the idea of creating scenes from her earlier and later life. The title and allegory are reminiscent of John Bunyan's Pilgrim's Progress.

In the first scene, an old woman praises her beauty and suggests a profitable occupation. In the second, she is a mistress with two lovers. In the third, she is a prostitute and is being arrested. In the fourth, she is beating hemp in Bridewell Prison. In the fifth scene, she is dying from venereal disease. In the last panel, she is dead at the age of 23.

== History ==
The protagonist "M. Hackabout" (see Plate 1, Plate 3, and the coffin-lid in Plate 6, which reads: "M. Hackabout Died Sept 2d 1731 Aged 23") is either named after the heroine of Moll Flanders and Kate Hackabout or ironically after the Blessed Virgin Mary. Kate was a notorious prostitute and the sister of highwayman Francis Hackabout. He was hanged on 17 April 1730. She was convicted of keeping a disorderly house in August the same year, having been arrested by Westminster magistrate Sir John Gonson.

The series of paintings proved to be very popular and Hogarth used his experience as an apprentice to a silversmith to create engravings of the images, selling a "limited edition" of 1,240 sets of six prints to subscribers for a guinea. Pirate copies of the engravings were soon in circulation, and Hogarth procured an act of parliament, the Engraving Copyright Act 1734 (8 Geo. 2. c. 13), to prohibit the practice. Soon after, Hogarth published his second series of satirical and moralistic images, A Rake's Progress, followed ten years later by Marriage à-la-mode.

The original paintings were destroyed in a fire at Fonthill House in 1755, the country house of William Beckford (1709–1770), a politician and father of William Thomas Beckford (1 October 1760 – 2 May 1844) the builder of Fonthill Abbey in Wiltshire. The original plates survived, and were sold by Hogarth's widow, Jane, to John Boydell in 1789; by him to Baldwin, Cradock and Joy in 1818; and then to Henry Bohn in 1835. Each produced further copies. In 1921, the copperplates were sold by Bernard Quaritch. They are now in the collection of Edison Dick of Chicago.

== Adaptation ==
British composer Iain Bell composed an operatic adaptation of the work which opened at the Theater an der Wien in Vienna in 2013 with German soprano Diana Damrau in the title role. The world premiere of the opera A Harlot's Progress was on 13 October 2013.

== The plates ==
Plate 1	Moll Hackabout arrives in London at the Bell Inn, Cheapside
	The protagonist, Moll Hackabout, has arrived in London's Cheapside. Moll carries scissors and a pincushion hanging on her arm, suggesting that she sought employment as a seamstress. Instead, she is being inspected by the pox-ridden Elizabeth Needham, a notorious procuress and brothel-keeper, who wants to secure Moll for prostitution. The notorious rake Colonel Francis Charteris and his pimp, John Gourlay, look on, also interested in Moll. The two stand in front of a decaying building, symbolic of their moral bankruptcy. Charteris fondles himself in expectation.
Londoners ignore the scene, and even a mounted clergyman ignores her predicament, just as he ignores the fact of his horse knocking over a pile of pans. Moll appears to have been deceived by the possibility of legitimate employment. A goose in Moll's luggage is addressed to "My lofing cosen in Tems Stret in London": suggesting that she has been misled. This "cousin" might have been a recruiter or a paid-off dupe of the bawdy keepers. Moll is dressed in white, in contrast to those around her, illustrating her innocence and naiveté. The dead goose in or near Moll's luggage, similarly white, foreshadows Moll's death as a result of her gullibility. The inn sign, with a picture of a bell, may refer to the belle (French for beautiful woman) who has newly arrived from the country. The teetering pile of pans alludes to Moll's imminent "fall". The goose and the teetering pans also mimic the inevitable impotence that ensues from syphilis, foreshadowing Moll's specific fate. The composition resembles that of a Visitation, i.e. the visit of Mary with Elizabeth as recorded in the Gospel of Luke 1:39–56.
Plate 2	Moll is now a kept woman, the mistress of a wealthy merchant
	Moll is now the mistress of a wealthy Jewish merchant, as is confirmed by the Old Testament paintings in the background which have been considered to be prophetic of how the merchant will treat Moll in between this plate and the third plate. She has numerous affectations of dress and accompaniment, as she keeps a West Indian serving boy and a monkey. The boy and the young female servant, as well as the monkey, may be provided by the businessman. The presence of the servant, the monkey and the mahogany table of tea things all suggest the merchant's wealth has been made in the colonies. She has jars of cosmetics, a mask from masquerades, and her apartment is decorated with paintings illustrating her sexually promiscuous and morally precarious state. She pushes over a table to distract the merchant's attention, as a second lover tiptoes out.
Plate 3	Moll has gone from kept woman to common prostitute
	Moll has gone from kept woman to common prostitute. Her maid is now old and syphilitic, and Henry Fielding, in Tom Jones (2:3), would say that the maid looks like his character of Mrs. Partridge. Her bed is her only major piece of furniture, and the cat poses to suggest Moll's new posture. The witch hat and birch rod on the wall suggest either black magic, or more importantly that prostitution is the devil's work. A more practical explanation could be that the witch's hat is part of a frightening disguise comparable to the masks worn by modern dominatrices, and the birch rod is for the fustigation/titillation of masochistic customers. Her heroes are on the wall: Macheath from The Beggar's Opera and Henry Sacheverell. Two cures for syphilis are above them. The wig box of highwayman James Dalton, hanged on 11 May 1730, is stored over her bed, suggesting a romantic dalliance. The magistrate, Sir John Gonson, with three armed bailiffs, is coming through the door on the right side of the frame to arrest Moll for her activities. Moll is showing off a new watch, perhaps a present from Dalton, perhaps stolen from another lover, and exposing her left breast. Gonson, however, is fixed upon the witch's hat and 'broom' or the periwig hanging from the wall above Moll's bed. The composition satirically resembles that of an Annunciation, i.e. the announcement by the angel Gabriel to the Virgin Mary that she would conceive and become the mother of Jesus, the Son of God, as recorded in the Gospel of Luke 1:26–39.
Plate 4	Moll beats hemp in Bridewell Prison
	Moll, the jailer and his wife Moll is in Bridewell Prison. She beats hemp for hangman's nooses, while the jailer threatens her and points to the task. In Tom Jones, Fielding wrote that Thwackum, one of Tom Jones's sadistic tutors, looked precisely like the jailer (Tom Jones 3:6). The jailer's wife steals clothes from Moll, winking at theft. The prisoners go from left to right in order of decreasing wealth. Moll is standing next to a gentleman, a card-sharp whose extra playing card has fallen out, and who has brought his dog with him. The inmates are in no way being reformed, despite the ironic engraving on the left above the occupied stocks, reading "Better to Work/ than Stand thus." The person suffering in the stocks apparently refused to work.
prisoners, Moll's servant Next is a woman, a child who may have Down syndrome, probably belonging to the sharper, and a pregnant African woman who presumably "pleaded her belly" when brought to trial, as pregnant women could not be executed or transported. A prison graffito shows John Gonson hanging from the gallows. Moll's servant smiles as Moll's clothes are stolen. The servant appears to be wearing Moll's shoes.
Plate 5	Moll dying of syphilis
	Two doctors and the landlady Moll is now dying of syphilis. Dr. Richard Rock on the left (black hair) and Dr. Jean Misaubin on the right (white hair) argue over their medical methods, which appear to be a choice of bleeding (Rock) and cupping (Misaubin). A woman, possibly Moll's bawd and possibly the landlady, rifles though Moll's possessions for what she wishes to take away.
Moll, her maid and son Meanwhile, Moll's maid tries to stop the looting and arguing. Moll's son sits by the fire, possibly sick with syphilis as well. He is picking lice or fleas out of his hair. The only hint as to the apartment's owner is a Passover cake used as a fly-trap, implying that her former keeper is paying for her in her last days and ironically indicating that Moll will, unlike the Israelites, not be spared. Several opiates ("anodynes") and "cures" litter the floor. Moll's clothes seem to reach down for her, as if they were ghosts drawing her to the afterlife.
Plate 6	Moll's wake
	Parson and Moll's son In the final plate, Moll is dead, and all of the scavengers are present at her wake. A plate on the coffin lid shows that she died aged 23, on 2 September 1731. The parson spills his brandy as he has his hand up the skirt of the girl next to him, and she appears pleased. A woman who has placed drinks on Moll's coffin looks on in disapproval. Moll's son plays ignorantly. Moll's son is innocent, but he sits playing with his top underneath his mother's body, unable to understand, and figuratively fated to death himself.
Moll's maid, other prostitutes Moll's madam drunkenly mourns on the right with a ghastly grinning jug of "Nants" (brandy). She is the only one who is upset at the treatment of the dead girl, whose coffin is being used as a tavern bar. A "mourning" girl (another prostitute) steals the undertaker's handkerchief. Another prostitute shows her injured finger to her fellow whore, while a woman adjusts her appearance in a mirror in the background, even though she shows a syphilitic sore on her forehead. The house holding the coffin has an ironic coat of arms on the wall displaying a chevron with three spigots, reminiscent of the "spill" of the parson, the flowing alcohol, and the expiration of Moll. The white hat hanging on the wall by the coat of arms is the one Moll wore in the first plate, referring back to the beginning of her end.

== Legacy ==
In 1733, John Breval, under the pen-name of Joseph Gay, published a poem The Lure of Venus: or, a Harlot's Progress. An heroi-comical poem. In six cantos. Founded upon Mr. Hogarth's six paintings; and illustrated with prints of them.

On 22 June 1828, William Innell Clement published Harlot's Progress in columns on a single page of his newspaper Bell's Life in London #330.

== See also ==
- List of works by William Hogarth
