= Daily Post (London newspaper) =

Newspaper

The Daily Post (1719–1771) was a London daily paper begun on October 4, 1719, by printer in the Old Bailey, near Ludgate, with contributions from Daniel Defoe. It was later printed by John Meres (a relation of Hugh Meres); Meres also became printer of the London Evening Post by 1737.

The Post consisted of articles that spoke of current events, important dates, inventions, advances in modern sciences, and other things of that nature. It lasted until 1771.
