= The Covent-Garden Tragedy =

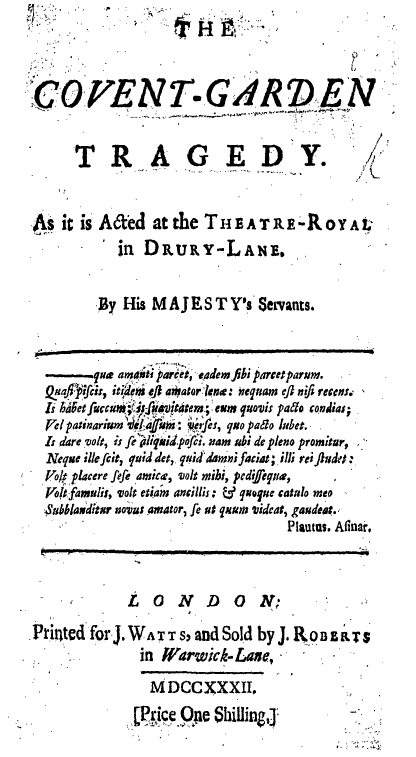
Titlepage to The Covent-Garden Tragedy

The Covent-Garden Tragedy is a play by Henry Fielding that first appeared on 1 June 1732 at the Theatre Royal, Drury Lane alongside The Old Debauchees. It is about a love triangle in a brothel involving two prostitutes. While they are portrayed satirically, they are imbued with sympathy as their relationship develops.

The play is a mockery of tragedy in general, but the characters contain realistic qualities separating them from other characters within Fielding's plays. This realism conflicts with the comedic nature. The play was a failure and ended its run after its first night, in part because it was set in a brothel. Contemporary critics noted the complete failure of the play and one implied that Fielding was acquainted with brothels. However, modern critics pointed out that the play was very good if not for its setting.

== Background ==
The Covent-Garden Tragedy appeared with The Old Debauchees on 1 June 1732. It was reported on 2 June by the Daily Post that both were well-received, but they retracted that claim on 5 June to say that only The Old Debauchees was well received. The Covent-Garden Tragedy was immediately ended after its first night because, according to Fielding, of the play's use of a brothel as a setting. Both plays were finished by 4 April 1732 when Fielding signed an agreement with John Watts to publish the plays for a sum of only 30 guineas. It was finally published on 24 June 1732.

Even though the first night fell apart, the play was performed again later; it eventually appeared again for four nights with Don Quixote in England and once separately in 1734 at the Little Haymarket. On 21 March 1735, it was performed at the York Building and again at the Little Haymarket on 28 December 1778. Although it was not successful, it was not truly unpopular, and its plot did not scare others away; it was adapted by William Holcroft as The Rival Queens, which was performed in 1794. Also, it succeeded when it was adapted into a puppet show. It was later reproduced by the National Theatre in 1968.

== Cast ==
- Lovegirlo
- Kissinda
- Stormanda
- Captain Bilkum
- Mother Punchbowl
- Leathersides

== Plot ==
The play deals with a love triangle in a brothel between two prostitutes, Kissinda and Stormandra, and Lovegirlo. Although the characters are portrayed satirically, they are imbued with sympathy as their relationship is developed. The plot is complicated when Captain Bilkum pursues Stormanda. Eventually, Bilkum is killed during a duel and Stormandra supposedly commits suicide, although this is later revealed not to be the case.

== Themes ==
Part of the plot is related to Ambrose Philips's The Distrest Mother but serves to mock tragedy in general. The characters are all related to prostitution and contain realistic qualities which separate the characters from others within Fielding's plays. Combined with real details, it is hard for the comedic nature of the play to take over. Even the written prolegomenon added to the published version is a biting satire. The character Mother Punchbowl plays with the image of motherhood in general, especially by having her be seen as a mother figure to prostitutes and those who frequent the brothels.

== Sources ==
During the play, Fielding emphasises the importance of Hogarth's satire and makes references to them through his plays, especially to A Harlot's Progress. Many of Fielding's characters are modelled after Hogarth's: his Mother Punchbowl, the brothel mistress, is modelled on Mother Needham, and Kissinda and Stormandra are modelled on the Harlot.

One of the characters, Leathersides, was a representation of a writer for The Grub-Street Journal. This allowed Fielding to mock one of his greatest contemporary critics. This was followed by Fielding's writing of "A Criticism on the Covent-Garden Tragedy, originally intended for the Grub-Street Journal". The piece mocks the bias of The Grub-Street Journal, portrays its critics as having no understanding of theatre, and characterises them as being jealous of Fielding's success.

== Critical response ==
The Daily Post wrote on 5 June 1732: "We are assured the Comedy call'd The Old Debauchees, did meet with universal Applause; but the Covent Garden Tragedy will be Acted no more, both the Author and the Actors being unwilling to continue any Piece contrary to the Opinion of the Town." The Grub-street Journal reprinted this on 8 June with the addition "For unwilling read unable" and later declared on 15 June that "It would be ridiculous to aim any sort of criticism upon so shameful a Piece". The piece continued to insinuate that Fielding had experience with brothels. This sparked a battle between Fielding and The Grub-Street Journal.

George Speaight believed that the play was "an amusing but coarse burlesque of the old-fashioned heroic drama". Thomas Clearly characterised the play as "A lukewarm burlesque of Ambrose Phillips' Distressed Mother". Robert Hume believe that "The travesty is genuinely brilliant in both conception and details, and there is much to relish here if one is not automatically disgusted by a play whose characters are a madam, her porter, her whores, and their customers." The Battestins declare that "Funny as it was [...] The Covent-Garden Tragedy was too ribald for the tastes of an audience accustomed to the genteel comedies of Cibber, or, nearer the mark, the more refined merriment of Gay's 'Newgate Pastoral'."
