= Harold E. Pagliaro =

American literary scholar (1925–2020)

- Born: June 19, 1925; The Bronx, New York City
- Died: February 15, 2020 (aged 94); Swarthmore, Pennsylvania

Academic background
- Education: Columbia University (BA, MA, PhD)

Academic work
- Discipline: English literature
- Institutions: Columbia University; Swarthmore College

Harold E. Pagliaro (June 19, 1925 – February 15, 2020) was an American literary scholar and expert on 18th-century English literature. He was the provost emeritus and Alexander Griswold Cummins Professor Emeritus of English Literature at Swarthmore College.

== Biography ==
Pagliaro was born June 19, 1925, in The Bronx. He graduated from Woodrow Wilson High School as senior class president in Portsmouth, Virginia, where his father relocated to oversee the construction of the Norfolk dry dock for the United States Navy. Upon returning to New York, Pagliaro enrolled in Columbia College to study engineering. After two semesters, he was drafted into the United States Army at 18. Having been trained at Fort Benning, Pagliaro was deployed to France as a replacement soldier in the 121st Cavalry Reconnaissance Unit. He received a Purple Heart, a Combat Infantryman Badge, and a Bronze Star Medal.

After being discharged in 1945, Pagliaro received his B.A., M.A., and Ph.D. degrees from Columbia. He taught at Columbia until 1964, when he joined Swarthmore's faculty. He taught 18th-century English literature and English Romantic poetry until his retirement in 1992. At Swarthmore, he was a two-time chairman of the English department and provost from 1974 to 1979. He was also a charter member of the American Society for Eighteenth-Century Studies.

On retiring, Pagliaro wrote Naked Heart: A Soldier's Journey to the Front (1996) about his life as a combat soldier during World War II, an experience that left him with lifelong trauma. He also authored books on the works of William Blake, Henry Fielding, and George Bernard Shaw.

Pagliaro died on February 15, 2020, of cancer at his home in Swarthmore, Pennsylvania.
