= Sawney (poem) =

1728 satirical poem by James Ralph

Sawney: An Heroic Poem. Occasion’d by the Dunciad
- by James Ralph
- Country: Great Britain
- Language: English
- Genre: Satire
- Meter: Blank verse
- Publisher: Printed for the author
- Publication date: 26 June 1728
- Lines: c. 300

Sawney: An Heroic Poem. Occasion’d by the Dunciad is an anonymous satirical poem of about 300 lines in blank verse, issued in London on 26 June 1728 and generally attributed to James Ralph. Written as a counter to Alexander Pope’s Dunciad, it recasts Pope as “Sawney” and levels charges of plagiarism and social pretension, opening with a long dedication “To the Gentlemen Scandaliz’d in the Dunciad.”

The pamphlet drew a swift response from Pope, who named Ralph in the 1729 Dunciad Variorum and returned to the attack in later notes. Contemporary and later commentators reported that the episode damaged Ralph’s reputation; writers associated with the Scriblerian circle mocked him in print, and he soon shifted his efforts from verse to prose criticism, journalism, and the stage.

== Publication ==
The quarto imprint reads “Printed for the Author, and sold by J. Roberts,” and the title page advertises the price at “One Shilling.” Although issued anonymously, both the ESTC and David F. Foxon’s catalogue attribute the pamphlet to James Ralph; Foxon further dates it to 26 June 1728 and files it among published replies to Pope’s Dunciad. John B. Shipley also gives the date 26 June 1728, noting it followed Ralph’s prose treatise The Touch-Stone by roughly five weeks.

== Content and themes ==
The poem is a mock-epic in blank verse, a point Ralph stresses in the prefatory matter. It opens with a sixteen-page dedication “To the Gentlemen Scandaliz’d in the Dunciad,” denouncing Pope’s satire as “so notoriously full of pride, insolence, beastliness … and extravagance.”

Its protagonist, “Sawney, a mimick sage of huge renown,” is a transparent portrait of Pope, plotting in his Twickenham grotto to profit from a fraudulent translation of the Odyssey and a new edition of Shakespeare. The narrative lampoons the Scriblerian circle—“Hounslow” (John Gay) and “Shameless” (Jonathan Swift) aid the scheme—and ends with Sawney’s plunge “into the vast Profund.”

Throughout, the poem catalogs alleged plagiarisms in Pope’s earlier works—Essay on Criticism, Windsor Forest, Rape of the Lock—and condemns his use of rhymed couplets, invoking Milton’s disdain for “the Lydian airs.” Ralph even lets Pope speak only in rhyme “that his Sentiments mayn’t lose the Advantage they so apparently want,” while holding up John Dryden as the preferred critical authority.

== Reception and aftermath ==
=== Pope’s immediate response ===
Pope later claimed he “had never even heard of Ralph” until Sawney appeared; nevertheless, in Book III of the 1729 Dunciad Variorum, he referenced the anonymous author—and Ralph’s signed poem Night—in a couplet:

“Silence, ye wolves! while Ralph to Cynthia howls,
And makes Night hideous—answer him, ye owls.”

— Alexander Pope

In marginal notes to later editions Pope labelled Ralph a “low writer [who] constantly attended his own works with panegyricks in the Journals,” and he recycled passages from Sawney’s dedication in the extended notes to the 1735 Dunciad.

=== Broader fallout ===
Ralph said the attack made him “the laughing stock of Grub Street” and “in danger of starving as the booksellers no longer had any confidence in his capacity.” Biographer Robert W. Kenny judged that after this “he was never taken seriously as a poet.”

Hostility persisted. In January 1730 members of the Scriblerian circle launched The Grub-Street Journal, edited by Dr Martyn and Richard Russell “at the instance of Pope,” and the paper mocked Ralph as “one who would have lived and died in obscurity had it not been for the ingenious author of the Dunciad who left him to be hooted at by the owls.” Horace Walpole called him “a dull author,” and Paul Whitehead’s The State Dunces (1733) ridiculed him as “a tiny witling of these writing days, full fam’d for tuneless rhimes and short-lived plays.”

Literary historian Elizabeth R. McKinsey concludes that this wave of ridicule “sealed Ralph’s historical oblivion,” whereas fellow blank-verse revivalist James Thomson escaped Pope’s barbs and secured lasting fame.

=== Impact on Ralph’s career ===
Ralph abandoned verse and turned to prose criticism, drama, and eventually politics and history. His publication of The Touch-Stone in May 1728 helped initiate a connection with Henry Fielding, with whom he later collaborated in theatre. His 1729 Miscellaneous Poems reprinted earlier works—Night, Zeuma, Clarinda, The Muses’ Address to the King, and The Tempest—but conspicuously left out Sawney and the anonymous Loss of Liberty.

== Sources ==
- "ESTC entry T47116 – Sawney. An Heroic Poem". English Short-Title Catalogue. British Library.
- Foxon, David F. (1975). English Verse 1701–1750: A Catalogue of Separately Printed Poems with Notes on Contemporary Collected Editions. Cambridge University Press.
- Guerinot, J. V. (1969). Pamphlet Attacks on Alexander Pope, 1711–1744: A Descriptive Bibliography. New York University Press. pp. 124–127.
- Kenny, Robert W. (1940). "James Ralph: An Eighteenth-Century Philadelphian in Grub Street". The Pennsylvania Magazine of History and Biography. 64 (2): 218–242. JSTOR 20087279.
- McKillop, Alan D. (1961). "James Ralph in Berkshire". Studies in English Literature, 1500–1900. 1 (3): 43–51. doi:10.2307/449304. JSTOR 449304.
- McKinsey, Elizabeth R. (1973). "James Ralph: The Professional Writer Comes of Age". Proceedings of the American Philosophical Society. 117 (1): 57–66. JSTOR 985948.
- Okie, Laird (1967). "James Ralph's Political Career and Publications". Huntington Library Quarterly. 30 (4): 868–869.
- Pope, Alexander (1729). The Dunciad Variorum (1729). J. Wright.
- Shipley, John B. (1968). "The Authorship of "The Touch‑Stone"". Papers of the Bibliographical Society of America. 62 (2): 189–198. doi:10.1086/pbsa.62.2.24301925. JSTOR 24301925.
