= Night (Ralph poem) =

1728 blank-verse poem by James Ralph

Night, a Poem in Four Books
- by James Ralph
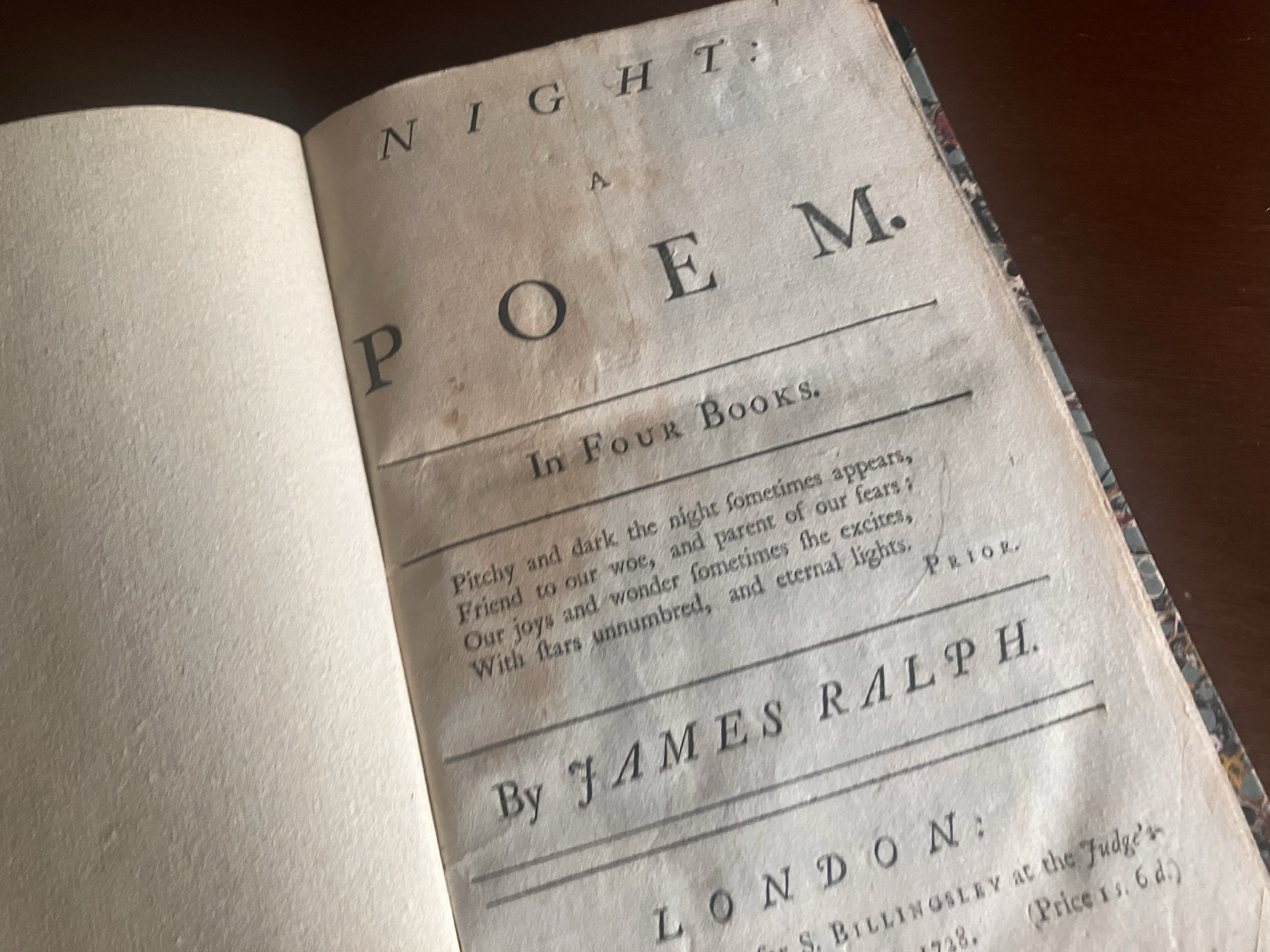
- Title page (London, 1728)
- Country: Great Britain
- Language: English
- Subject(s): Night; London; mortality
- Genre(s): Blank-verse meditation
- Form: Blank verse
- Publisher: J. Roberts
- Publication date: 1728
- Lines: c. 1,100

Night, a Poem in Four Books is a 1728 blank verse poem by the British writer James Ralph. Issued in quarto by the London printer J. Roberts, it comprises about 1,100 lines of unrhymed iambic pentameter arranged in four books. The poem reflects on London after dark—urban corruption, mortality, and nocturnal imagery—and participates in the late-1720s vogue for descriptive blank verse associated with James Thomson’s The Seasons.

Night received little contemporary notice until Alexander Pope, after Ralph answered the first edition of the Dunciad with Sawney, added a couplet about Ralph and the poem in the 1729 Variorum. Contributors close to Pope, notably the Grub-Street Journal (1730–33), then used Night as a target. Modern criticism reads the poem both as an early graveyard-poetry text and as a Whig allegory of metropolitan corruption, and Ralph soon shifted from such blank-verse experiments to satire and drama.

== Publication ==
The quarto imprint lists J. Roberts in Warwick Lane as publisher; copies sold for one shilling. Unlike many Grub Street pamphlets, the title page openly credits Ralph as author. Letters to the Reverend John Gough between February and June 1727 record Ralph canvassing London booksellers, drafting subscription proposals, and persuading the British Journal of 24 June 1727 to print long extracts from each book of the still-unfinished poem. Although the subscription volume never appeared, a quarto edition of Night was issued in early 1728, with a re-issue dated 1729 advertising companion pieces such as Temperance and Myror.

During this period Ralph was in financial distress—borrowing widely and appealing to friends for loans—yet, as McKinsey observes, remained “wildly optimistic that his serious poems would sell well.”

== Structure and themes ==
Organised in four books, Night belongs to the vogue for discursive blank-verse landscape poems launched by James Thomson. The four books comprise roughly 1,100 lines in unrhymed pentameter.

Cecil A. Moore calls the poem “written in imitation of Thomson’s Winter” and cites Ralph’s own 1729 preface as evidence that he chose “so grave a subject” partly because “Mr. Thomson’s admirable poems were generally received with applause.”

Robert W. Kenny describes it as “a conventional season poem” whose unrhymed pentameter—though Ralph’s preface praises Milton—“owes much” in diction and end-stopped cadence to Thomson’s Winter (1726) and Summer (1727). Alongside graveyard reflections on London after dark, the poem interpolates descriptive set-pieces of Greenland, the West Indies, and Niagara Falls.

Eric Parisot argues that Ralph converts the nocturnal setting into “a metaphoric prayer closet,” waking “the studious soul to solemn thought” and offering solace “Wrapp’d in thy shades,” a posture associated with graveyard poetry’s meditation on death and moral reflection.

Elizabeth R. McKinsey interprets the work as a Whig “ancient-liberty” allegory warning against metropolitan corruption. She also argues that, although Ralph probably did not influence Thomson’s technique directly, “the volume of his early poetry, all unrhymed, contributed substantially…to the weight of Thomson’s example set for later poets.” In the preface Ralph defends blank verse because it “affords the largest room for variety of expression, strength of images, and beauty of metaphors,” a form that, he claims, “exposes his meaning in the strongest light.”

== Reception ==
Night received little contemporary notice until Alexander Pope’s satirical attack on it in the second edition of his Dunciad (1728). Ralph had replied to the first edition with a satire of his own, Sawney. An Heroic Poem Occasion’d by the Dunciad. Pope later claimed he “had never even heard of Ralph” until Sawney appeared; nevertheless, in the Variorum edition (1729) he added a couplet mocking both Ralph and Night:

“Silence, ye wolves! while Ralph to Cynthia howls,
And makes Night hideous—answer him, ye owls.”

— Alexander Pope (1729),

Pope’s scorn “sealed Ralph’s fate,” and writers in Pope’s circle—especially the Grub-Street Journal—attacked virtually everything Ralph wrote, dismissing Night as a “loose pindarick” and calling the poem “all digression … the big Meanwhile.”

== Legacy ==
Ralph followed Night with further verse, notably the Spenserian pastiche Zeuma (1729), but contemporary indifference to his early blank-verse experiments pushed him toward more commercial genres. By 1728–30 he had turned to satire in prose (The Touch-Stone), poetry (Sawney), and drama (The Fashionable Lady), the first of several career pivots that would mark his next three decades as a writer.

== See also ==
- James Ralph
- The Dunciad

== Sources ==
- Kenny, Robert W. (1940). "James Ralph: An Eighteenth-Century Philadelphian in Grub Street". The Pennsylvania Magazine of History and Biography. 64 (2): 218–242. JSTOR 20087279.
- McKillop, Alan D. (1961). "James Ralph in Berkshire". Studies in English Literature, 1500–1900. 1 (3): 43–51. doi:10.2307/449304. JSTOR 449304.
- McKinsey, Elizabeth R. (1973). "James Ralph: The Professional Writer Comes of Age". Proceedings of the American Philosophical Society. 117 (1): 57–66. JSTOR 985948.
- Moore, Cecil A. (1916). "Shaftesbury and the Ethical Poets in England, 1700–1760". PMLA. 31 (2): 290–292. doi:10.2307/456959. JSTOR 456959.
- Parisot, Eric (2011). "Piety, Poetry, and the Funeral Sermon: Reading Graveyard Poetry in the Eighteenth Century". English Studies. 92 (2): 174–192. doi:10.1080/0013838X.2010.536686.
- Pope, Alexander (1729). The Dunciad Variorum (1729). J. Wright.
- Ralph, James (1728). Night. A Poem in Four Books. London: Printed for J. Roberts.
- Shipley, John B. (1968). "The Authorship of "The Touch‑Stone"". Papers of the Bibliographical Society of America. 62 (2): 189–198. doi:10.1086/pbsa.62.2.24301925. JSTOR 24301925.
