= Pasquin (play) =

1736 play

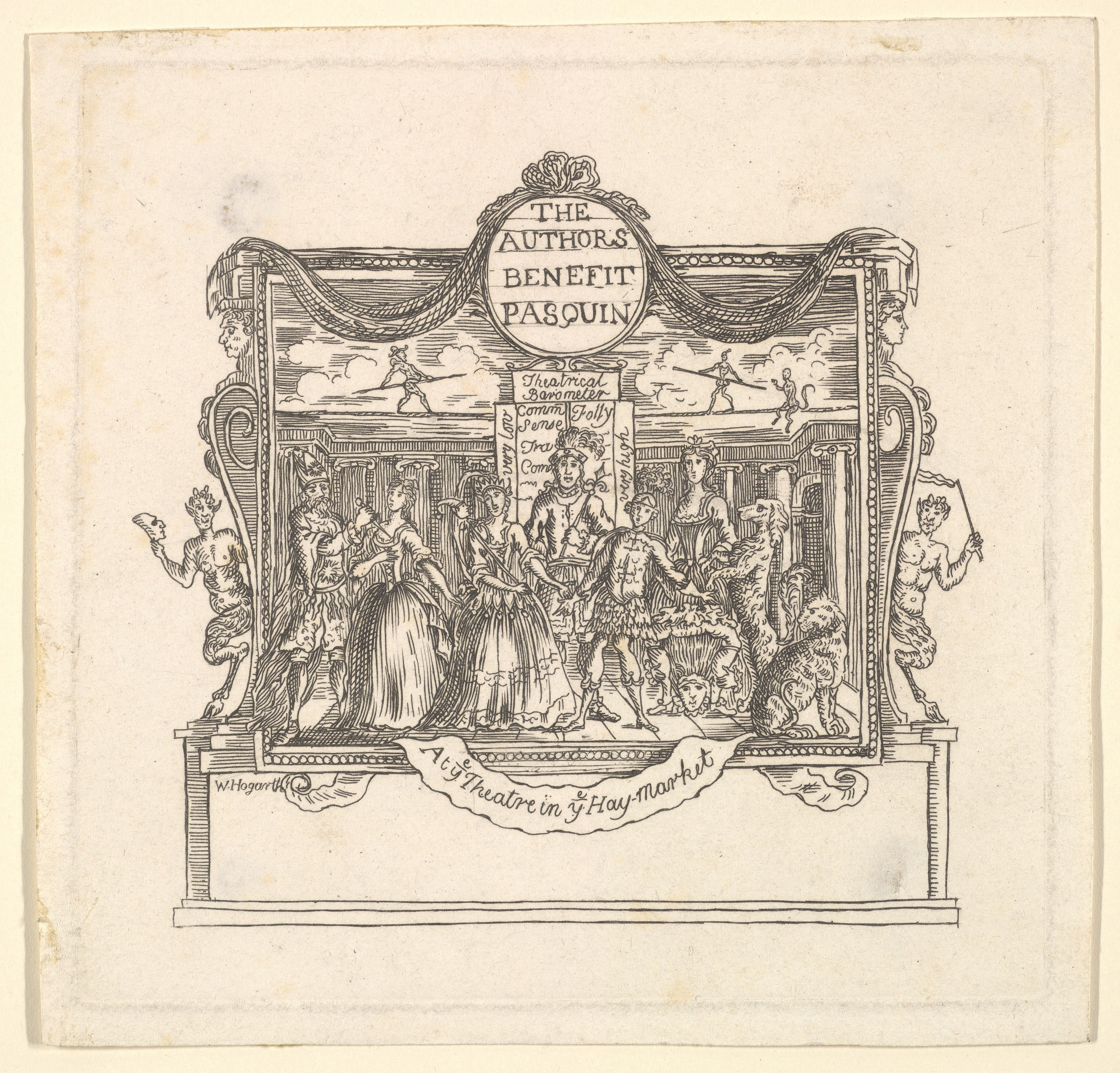
- Written by: Henry Fielding
- Original language: English
- Genre: Comedy

Premiere
- Date premiered: 5 March 1736
- Place premiered: Haymarket Theatre

Pasquin is a 1736 comedy play by Henry Fielding. It is a satire on both politics and the theatre, with a play within a play plot about a group of actors attempting to put on a production about a local election. It takes its name from Pasquin, a historic statue in Rome.

The original Haymarket cast included John Roberts as Trapwell, James Lacy as Fustian, Charlotte Charke as Lord Place and John Freeman as Colonel Promise. It was the success of the season with an estimated 25,000 people seeing its original run of forty performances.

== Bibliography ==
- Bullard, Paddy. The Oxford Handbook of Eighteenth-Century Satire. Oxford University Press, 2019.
- Burling, William J. A Checklist of New Plays and Entertainments on the London Stage, 1700-1737. Fairleigh Dickinson Univ Press, 1992.
- Nicoll, Allardyce. A History of Early Eighteenth Century Drama: 1700-1750. CUP Archive, 1927.
