= The Touch-Stone =

1728 satirical essay collection on London entertainment by James Ralph

The Touch‑Stone; or, Historical, Critical, Political, Philosophical, and Theological Essays on the Reigning Diversions of the Town
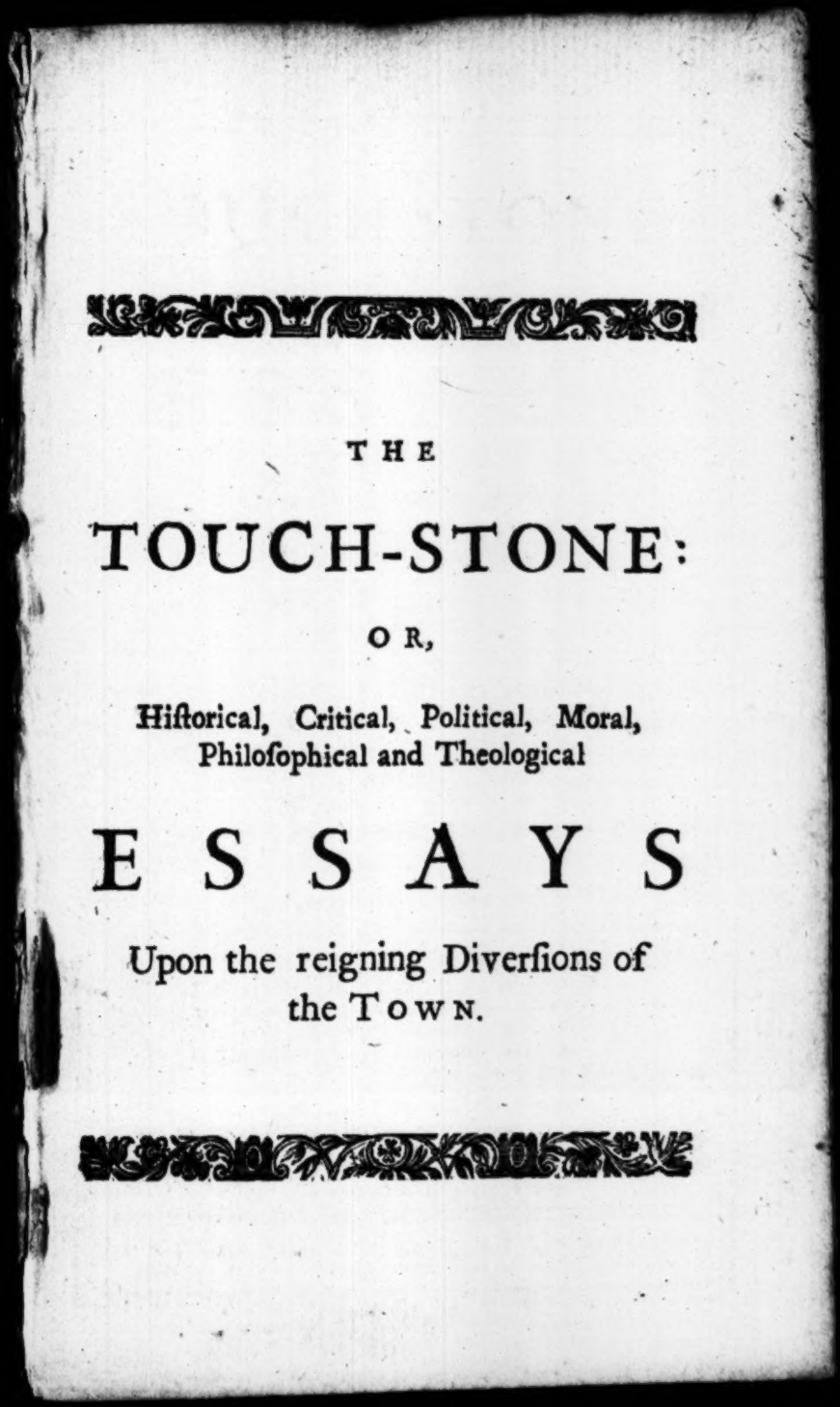
- Title page (1729 issue)
- Author: Anonymous (attributed to James Ralph)
- Language: English
- Genre: Satire, theatre criticism
- Publisher: "Printed, and sold by the booksellers of London and Westminster"
- Publication date: 1728 (1st ed.); 1731 (re‑issued as The Taste of the Town)
- Publication place: Great Britain
- Media type: Print (octavo)
- Pages: 236 (1st ed.)

The Touch-Stone; or, Historical, Critical, Political, Philosophical, and Theological Essays on the Reigning Diversions of the Town is a 1728 anonymous satirical pamphlet, generally attributed to the Grub-Street writer James Ralph. Issued in octavo and reissued in 1731 under the title The Taste of the Town, it offers a mock-heroic survey of London entertainments—Italian opera, spoken drama, puppet-shows, fairs and masquerades—while arguing for "good taste" and proposing native English subjects such as Tom Thumb, Robin Hood and Dick Whittington and His Cat for the lyric stage. The essays lampoon exorbitant opera fees, scenic spectacle that overwhelms plot, and the jargon of pedantic critics.

Later scholars have described the pamphlet as a lively contemporary portrait of 1720s amusements and an early contribution to English theatrical criticism. The work also influenced the early burlesques of Henry Fielding, especially Tom Thumb (1730) and The Tragedy of Tragedies (1731).

Although published anonymously, the work has long been attributed to Ralph. The attribution has been debated, notably over the tone of its opening essay on Italian opera, but subsequent analyses read that passage as sustained irony; modern reference works and recent critics generally accept Ralph as the author.

== Publication history ==
- 1728: First edition issued anonymously in octavo, advertised for sale on 17 May 1728; imprint reads "Printed, and sold by the booksellers of London and Westminster."
- 1729: The same sheets re‑issued with a cancel title-page labelled "Second Edition" (no textual changes).
- 1731: Remaining sheets re-issued once more with a new title-page, The Taste of the Town: or, a Guide to all Publick Diversions; the dedication is signed "A. Primcock".

== Authorship ==
The Touch-Stone appeared anonymously in 1728 and was reissued in 1731 as The Taste of the Town. Four late-18th- or very early-19th-century fly-leaf inscriptions, apparently independent of one another, preserve the traditional attribution:

- British Museum – 1728 Touch-Stone; fly-leaf annotated by collector James Bindley c. 1790s: "By Mr James Ralph ...".
- Northwestern University – 1728 Touch‑Stone; note reads: "By Mr James Ralph who since wrote a History of England &c &c &c." Ink possibly pre-dates 1815.
- Princeton University – 1728 Touch‑Stone; front flyleaf inscription: "By Ralph—"; dated by the curator to the eighteenth or very early nineteenth century.
- Bryn Mawr College – 1731 Taste of the Town; inscription reads: "This Book was first published under the name of the Touchstone, the Author of it was Ralph", likely in an eighteenth-century hand.

Musicologist Irving Lowens dismissed the Bindley note as "late second-hand gossip" and—seemingly unaware of the other copies or Bindley's standing as an antiquarian—argued that the pamphlet's seemingly earnest defence of Italian opera was alien to Ralph, "a newcomer of less than four years' residence" and no opera devotee; he therefore proposed an unnamed Grub-Street author instead.

Literary historian Margaret McKinsey suggests that Lowens had "failed to understand the spoof", mistaking the opera essay's sustained irony for literal praise and thus overlooking the satire that pervades all seven essays. Bibliographer John B. Shipley set out why the attribution still fits Ralph, answering Lowens on three practical points:

- Printing history: the 1729 and 1731 impressions are the same 1728 sheets with new title‑pages, not fresh editions, so they reveal nothing about sales.
- Silence of contemporaries: anonymity was standard; the silence of Thomas Birch—and even Pope, who noticed Ralph only after Sawney—does not weigh against authorship.
- Composition window: drawing on Ralph's recorded theatre‑going, Shipley shows the pamphlet could have been drafted after The Beggar's Opera (29 January 1728) and on sale by 17 May, a perfectly plausible window.

Shipley acknowledged that Lowens's most substantial objection lay inside the text itself: the opening essay appears to deliver an earnest, learned defence of Italian opera—an enthusiasm seemingly at odds with Ralph's lifelong devotion to the spoken stage. Lowens inferred from this that "nothing known about Ralph ... marks him an opera buff". Shipley, however, argued that the defence dissolves in parody: halfway through, the author slyly proposes folk ballads such as "The Children in the Wood" for Italian treatment, revealing the whole encomium as an extended lampoon of fashionable taste. Read in that ironic light, the opera essay no longer contradicts Ralph's outlook but fits the pamphlet's broader burlesque method. He then marshalled internal parallels:

- Shared satiric targets – The Touch-Stone ridicules both Gay and Swift, calling The Beggar's Opera "a wretched piece". This satiric posture closely mirrors the contempt Ralph expressed toward the same figures in his poem Sawney (26 June 1728), issued five weeks later.
- Consistent admiration for John Dryden – Dryden is the most frequently praised critic in the pamphlet; Ralph likewise singles him out in The Muses' Address to the King (August 1728) and later tried to prepare a collected Dryden edition.
- Mandevillean irreligion – Repeated jibes at clergy, church-going and Bible tales echo Bernard de Mandeville's The Fable of the Bees, which the author cites approvingly; Ralph's letters and Benjamin Franklin's memoir confirm his deist, anti-clerical bent and his known reading of Mandeville.
- Library concordance – The essays quote Juan Huarte's Examen des Ingenios; a copy of that work was in Ralph's personal library and was bought by Benjamin Franklin at the 1762 auction of Ralph's books.

Because these stylistic markers dovetail with the four early fly-leaf attributions, Shipley concluded that their "combined force ... lends weight to the traditionally accepted view that Ralph wrote The Touch-Stone; until better evidence appears, the case rests on that good possibility." McKinsey concurs that Shipley's analysis "convincingly refuted" Lowens, turning the opera objection into evidence of Ralph's broad satiric scope. Even Lowens allowed that "there is no clear internal evidence ... that would make an attribution to Ralph impossible ... [and] certain small touches ... seem to lend credence to such a claim." Modern reference works such as the Oxford Dictionary of National Biography and scholars including Martin Battestin follow Shipley's verdict.

== Background ==
The pamphlet marked a pivot from high-flown heroic verse to the more marketable world of satire. After two ambitious blank-verse poems—The Tempest (1727) and Night (1728)—failed to find readers, James Ralph turned to prose satire (The Touch-Stone), verse lampoon (Sawney), and comic drama (The Fashionable Lady), the first of several reinventions in his career.

== Content and themes ==
Drawing on the author's "first-hand feel for the pulse of the city"—sharpened, according to one account, by nights spent roaming St Bartholomew's and the play-houses with the young Benjamin Franklin—The Touch-Stone announces its aim "to animadvert upon the standard Entertainments of the present Age, in hopes that those who have Power and Capacity may one Day fix our publick Diversions upon a Basis as lasting, as beneficial to Mankind." One study calls the book "a broad and racy account of the amusements of the London pleasure-seeker", noting that its running lament over the eclipse of "true comedy" by ballad-opera, harlequinades and stage-machinery became a rallying-cry for reform-minded playwrights. The tract blends "serious criticism, thoughtful history and irreverent satire", a mixture that has been compared to Hogarth's graphic prints and, later, to the comic novels of Fielding.

The pamphlet is a plea for "good taste" and defines taste as the harmony of truth, propriety and civility, then tours London's amusements to show how far the town has strayed from that ideal. Opera singers exact ruinous fees, scenic machines eclipse plot, and critics—"formal, deep-finish'd blockheads" in the author's phrase—heckle for sport. The survey ranges from theatres to fairs, cock-pits and bear-baiting pits; the depiction of "gash'd faces, spouting veins, goary skulls" as a supposed national training-ground for martial valour has been compared to the later savageries of Hogarth's Four Stages of Cruelty. Throughout, the author disclaims any wish "to reflect upon ... Religion" before doing exactly that. This blend of moralising, street reportage and irreverent wit has been read as the prose analogue of Hogarth's satirical prints and a direct precursor of Fielding's comic drama.

The four "essays on Taste" mix mock-heroic rhetoric with practical theatre criticism:

- Opera & tragedy – mocks Italian opera for "singing in an unknown dialect" and ridicules "merry Tragedies" that provoke laughter rather than pity and terror.
- Native subjects – proposes English folk material for the lyric stage, offering a tongue-in-cheek repertory: Dick Whittington and His Cat, Robin Hood, Valentine and Orson, a dragon-slaying St George spectacular, and a short pastoral Tom Thumb.
- Spectacle & fairs – dissects puppet shows, prize-fights, Southwark vs Bartholomew Fair, John Henley's oratory, and Count Heidegger's masquerades, presenting a panoramic—and often scathing—portrait of 1720s popular culture.
- Critical jargon – satirises pedantic critics who prattle of "catastrophe, unity, probability" while praising unintelligibility as profundity.

== Reception ==
Early responses were mixed. The essayist Nathan Drake dismissed the work as "a production altogether worthless, and written in a style of extreme vulgarity". In the twentieth century, scholars reversed that verdict. Friedrich Brie (1927) called it a "wide-ranging and knowledgeable" survey of London's entertainments, while Charles Harold Gray (1931) praised its contribution to early theatrical criticism. Dane Farnsworth Smith (1936) emphasized its lively account of amusements, and W. L. MacDonald (1951) described it as "one of the best guides to the diversions which engaged the leisure time of the more select citizens of London". Later commentators stressed its documentary value: musicologist Irving Lowens (1959) highlighted the opening chapter as a vivid portrait of London's post-The Beggar's Opera opera scene, and John B. Shipley (1968) noted its "sound knowledge of and insight into the various forms of public entertainment in the London of the mid-1720s".

== Influence ==
The Touch-Stone made itself felt on London's stages almost at once, most clearly in the early farces of the twenty-three-year-old Henry Fielding. The pamphlet's list of "home-bred Subjects"—"Dick Whittington, Robin Hood, the Dragon of Wantley, Tom Thumb"—was echoed in Fielding's work, and the prologue to The Temple Beau (January 1730) repeats its complaint that "true" comedy was being elbowed aside by farce and opera. Critics have traced closer borrowings in Fielding's smash-hit burlesque Tom Thumb the Great (1730): the nursery-rhyme hero, the mockery of heroic tragedy, and the satire of pedantic critics such as Bentley and Theobald parallel themes first sketched in The Touch-Stone. Later scholarship has mapped the pamphlet's stock of giants, dragons and the "accident of the pudding" into Fielding's expanded burlesque The Tragedy of Tragedies (1731). The essay had even mock-recommended Tom Thumb as an opera subject—an in-joke Fielding inverted by turning the nursery tale into a comic tragedy.

== Sources ==
- Battestin, Martin C.; Battestin, Ruthe R. (1993). Henry Fielding: A Life. London: Routledge.
- Brie, Friedrich (1927). Englische Rokoko‑Epik (1710–1730). Munich: Beck. p. 101.
- Drake, Nathan (1809). Essays, Biographical, Critical, and Historical, Illustrative of the Rambler, Adventurer, &c. Vol. 1. London: C. and R. Baldwin. p. 65.
- Gray, Charles Harold (1931). Theatrical Criticism in London to 1795. New York: Columbia University Press.
- Hughes, Helen Sand (1922). "Fielding's Indebtedness to James Ralph". Modern Philology. 20 (1): 19–29. doi:10.1086/387429. JSTOR 433329.
- Kenny, Robert W. (1940). "James Ralph: An Eighteenth-Century Philadelphian in Grub Street". Pennsylvania Magazine of History and Biography. 64 (2): 218–242. JSTOR 20087279.
- Lowens, Irving (1959). "The Touch‑Stone (1728): A Neglected View of London Opera". The Musical Quarterly. 45 (3): 325–342. doi:10.1093/mq/XLV.3.325. JSTOR 740520.
- MacDonald, W. L. (1951). Pope and His Critics. London: Routledge. p. 10.
- McKinsey, Elizabeth R. (1973). "James Ralph: The Professional Writer Comes of Age". Proceedings of the American Philosophical Society. 117 (1): 57–66. JSTOR 985948.
- Okie, Laird (2004). "Ralph, James (1705?–1762)". Oxford Dictionary of National Biography (online ed.). Oxford University Press. doi:10.1093/ref:odnb/23060. (Subscription, Wikipedia Library access or UK public library membership required.)
- McKillop, Alan D. (1961). "James Ralph in Berkshire". Studies in English Literature, 1500–1900. 1 (3): 43–51. doi:10.2307/449304. JSTOR 449304.
- Ralph, James (1728). The Touch-Stone; or, Historical, Critical, Political, Philosophical, and Theological Essays on the Reigning Diversions of the Town. Published anonymously; modern scholarship attributes the work to Ralph. London: Printed, and sold by the booksellers of London and Westminster.
- Ralph, James (1731). the Taste of the Town : or, a Guide to All Publick Diversions ... London: Printed for J. Roberts. OCLC 8882191. "Epistle dedicatory signed: A. Primcock [i.e. James Ralph]."
- Shipley, John B. (1956). "Franklin Attends a Book Auction". Pennsylvania Magazine of History and Biography. 80 (1): 37–45.
- Shipley, John B. (1968). "The Authorship of "The Touch‑Stone"". Papers of the Bibliographical Society of America. 62 (2): 189–198. doi:10.1086/pbsa.62.2.24301925. JSTOR 24301925.
- Smith, Dane Farnsworth (1936). Plays About the Theatre in England from 'The Rehearsal' in 1671 to the Licensing Act in 1737. London: Macmillan. pp. 153–154.
