= The Author's Farce =

1730 play by Henry Fielding

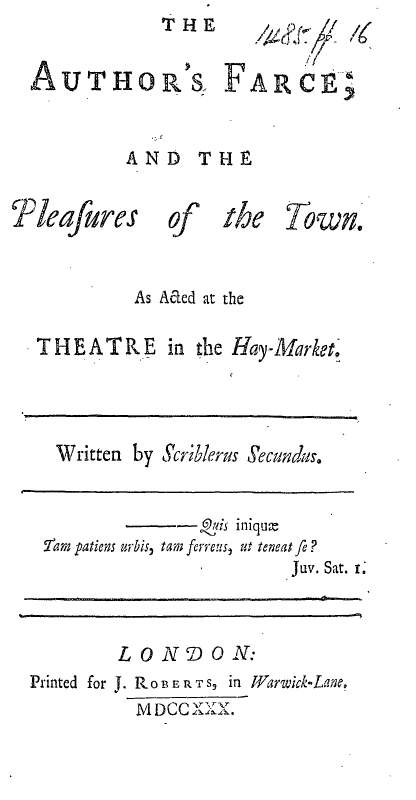
Title page from The Author's Farce

The Author's Farce and the Pleasures of the Town is a play by the English playwright and novelist Henry Fielding, first performed on 30 March 1730 at the Little Theatre, Haymarket. Written in response to the Theatre Royal's rejection of his earlier plays, The Author's Farce was Fielding's first theatrical success. The Little Theatre allowed Fielding the freedom to experiment, and to alter the traditional comedy genre. The play ran during the early 1730s and was altered for its run starting 21 April 1730 and again in response to the Actor Rebellion of 1733. Throughout its life, the play was coupled with several different plays, including The Cheats of Scapin and Fielding's Tom Thumb.

The first and second acts deal with the attempts of the central character, Harry Luckless, to woo his landlady's daughter, and his efforts to make money by writing plays. In the second act, he finishes a puppet theatre play titled The Pleasures of the Town, about the Goddess Nonsense's choice of a husband from allegorical representatives of theatre and other literary genres. After its rejection by one theatre, Luckless's play is staged at another. The third act becomes a play within a play, in which the characters in the puppet play are portrayed by humans. The Author's Farce ends with a merging of the play's and the puppet show's realities.

The play established Fielding as a popular London playwright, and the press reported that seats were in great demand. Although largely ignored by critics until the 20th century, most agree that the play is primarily a commentary on events in Fielding's life, signalling his transition from older forms of comedy to the new satire of his contemporaries. Fielding's play within a play satirised the way in which the London theatre scene, in his view, abused the literary public by offering new and inferior genres. The Author's Farce is now considered to be a critical success and a highly skilled satire.

== Plot ==
Most of Fielding's plays were written in five acts, but The Author's Farce was written in three. The opening introduces the main character, Harry Luckless, and his attempts to woo Harriot, the daughter of his landlady Mrs. Moneywood. The play begins in much the same way as Fielding's earlier romance-themed comedies, but quickly becomes a different type of play, mocking the literary and theatrical establishment. Luckless is trying to become a successful writer, but lacks the income that would allow him to concentrate on his writing. Although others try to support him financially, Luckless refuses their help; when his friend, Witmore, pays his rent behind his back, Luckless steals the money from Mrs. Moneywood. In the second act, Luckless seeks assistance to help finish his play, The Pleasures of the Town, but is poorly advised, and the work is rejected by his local theatre. Luckless revises his play and succeeds in finding an alternative venue, leading to the third act, in which the work is performed as a puppet show, with actors taking the place of the puppets.

The third act is dominated by the puppet show, a play within the play. It begins when the Goddess of Nonsense chooses a mate from a series of suitors along the River Styx. All dunces, the suitors include Dr. Orator, Sir Farcical Comic, Mrs. Novel, Bookseller, Poet, Monsieur Pantomime, Don Tragedio and Signior Opera. The goddess eventually chooses a foreign castrato opera singer as her favourite — Signior Opera — after he sings an aria about money. Mrs. Novel then claims that she loved Signior Opera, and died giving birth to his child. At this revelation, the goddess becomes upset, but is quick to forgive. The play within the play is interrupted by Constable and Murdertext, who arrive to arrest Luckless "for abusing Nonsense", but Mrs. Novel persuades Murdertext to let the play finish. Someone from the land of Bantam then arrives to tell Luckless that he is the prince of Bantam. News follows that the King of Bantam has died, and that Luckless is to be made the new king. The play concludes with the revelation that Luckless's landlady is in reality the Queen of "Old Brentford" and that her daughter, Harriot, is now royalty. An epilogue in which four poets discuss how the play should end is brought to a conclusion by a cat, in the form of a woman.

== Themes ==
Fielding uses Luckless and The Author's Farce to portray aspects of his life, including his experience with the London theatre community. The plot serves as revenge for the Theatre Royal's rejection of Fielding's earlier plays. However, this and his being forced into minor theatres proved beneficial, because it allowed him more freedom to experiment with his plays in ways that would have been unacceptable at larger locations. This experimentation, beginning with The Author's Farce, is an attempt by Fielding to try writing in formats beyond the standard five-act comedy play. Though he returned to writing five-act plays later, many of his plays contain plot structures that differ from those common to contemporary plays. To distinguish his satirical intent, Fielding claims that the work was written by "Scriblerus Secundus," which places his play within an earlier literary tradition. The name refers to the Scriblerus Club, a satirical group whose members included Alexander Pope, Jonathan Swift, John Gay, and John Arbuthnot. Fielding's use of the pseudonym connects his play to the satirical writings of the Scriblerus Club's members, and reveals their influence on his new style, such as incorporating in their work the styles of the entertainments that they were ridiculing. Fielding thus allows the audience to believe that he is poking fun at others, less discriminating than themselves, and less able to distinguish good art from bad. Fielding also borrowed characters from the work of the club's members, such as the Goddess of Nonsense, influenced by Pope's character from The Dunciad, Dulness, who is at war with reason. Nonsense, like Dulness, is a force that promotes the corruption of literature and taste, to which Fielding adds a sexual element. This sexuality is complicated, yet also made comical, when Nonsense chooses a castrated man as her mate. Her choice emphasises a lack of morality, one of the problems that Fielding believed dominated 18th-century British society. Despite the link to Dulness, the general satire of the play more closely resembles Gay's Beggar's Opera than the other works produced by the Scriblerus Club.

The Author's Farce is not a standard comedy; rather, it is a farce, and as such employs petty forms of humour like slapstick. Instead of relying on rhetorical wit, Fielding incorporates dramatic incongruities. For example, actors play puppets in a life-size version of a puppet play. Fielding's purpose in relying on the farce tradition was specifically to criticise society as a whole. Like others, Fielding believed that there was a decline in popular theatre related to the expansion of its audience, therefore he satirises it, its audiences, and its writers throughout The Author's Farce. Speaking of popular entertainment in London, Fielding's character Luckless claims, "If you must write, write nonsense, write operas, write entertainments, write Hurlothrumbos, set up an Oratory and preach nonsense, and you may meet with encouragement enough." Luckless's only ambition is to become successful. Many of the characters in the play believe that the substance of a play matters little as long as it can earn a profit. Harriot believes that the only important characteristic of a lover is his merit, which, to her, is his ability to become financially successful. Fielding later continues this line of attacks on audiences, morality, and genres when he criticises Samuel Richardson's epistolary novel Pamela, in which a nobleman makes advances upon a servant-maid with the intent of making her his mistress.

The blending of the fictional and real worlds at the end of the play represents the inability of individuals to distinguish between fictional and real experience. The final act of the play also serves as Fielding's defence of traditional hierarchical views of literature. He satirises new literary genres with low standards by using personified versions of them during the puppet show. In particular, Fielding mocks how contemporary audiences favoured Italian opera, a dramatic form that he regarded with contempt. Fielding considered it "a foreign intruder that has weaned the public from their native entertainments". The character Signior Opera, the image of the favoured castrato singer within the puppet show, is a parody of the foreigners who performed as singers, along with the audiences that accepted them. Additionally, the character serves as a source of humour that targets 18th-century literary genres; after the character Nonsense chooses the castrato Signior Opera as her husband, Mrs Novel objects, declaring that she gave birth to his child. This act would be physically impossible because Opera is a castrato, and it pokes fun at how the genres and the public treated such individuals. Fielding was not alone in using the castrato image for humour and satire; William Hogarth connects the castrato singer with politics and social problems, and many other contemporary works mock women who favour eunuchs.

== Sources ==
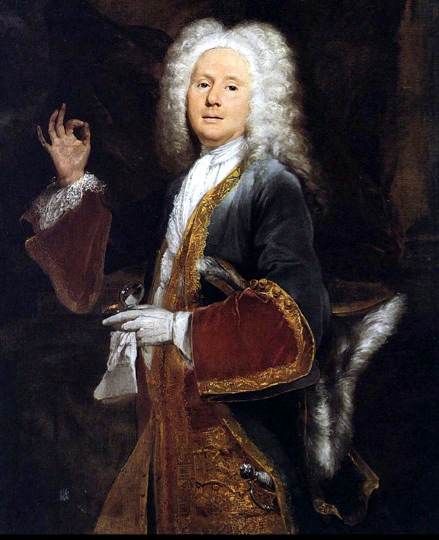
Colley Cibber as Lord Foppington

Many aspects of the play are drawn from Fielding's own experiences. During Act II, the characters Marplay and Sparkish, two theatre managers, offer poor advice to Luckless on how to improve his play, which they then reject. This fictional event mirrors Fielding's own life when Colley Cibber and Robert Wilks of the Theatre Royal rejected The Temple Beau. Cibber was an inspiration for the character of Marplay and Wilks for Sparkish, but Sparkish does not appear in the revised version of 1734, after Wilks's death. In his place Fielding introduces a character who mocks Theophilus Cibber, Colley's son, and his role in the Actor Rebellion of 1733. Another biographical parallel involves the relationship between Luckless and Mrs Moneywood, which is similar to Fielding's own relationship with Jan Oson, his landlord during his stay in Leiden in early 1729. There Fielding incurred a debt of about £13 (equivalent to about £1,760 as of 2008), (Note: Comparing relative purchasing power of £13 in 1729 with 2008) and a legal case was brought against him. Abandoning his personal property, Fielding fled to London; Oson's seizure of Fielding's possessions mirrors Mrs Moneywood's threats to seize those belonging to Luckless. Other characters are modelled on well-known personalities of whom Fielding was aware though they were not personal acquaintances: Mrs Novel is Eliza Haywood, a writer, actress, and publisher; Signior Opera is Senesino, a famous Italian contralto castrato; Bookweight is similar to Edmund Curll, a bookseller and publisher known for unscrupulous publication and publicity; Orator is John Henley, a clergyman, entertainer, and well-known orator; Monsieur Pantomime is John Rich, a director and theatre manager; and Don Tragedio is Lewis Theobald, an editor and author. Sir Farcical Comick is another version of Colley Cibber, but only in his role as an entertainer.

Fielding drew inspiration from many literary sources and traditions as well as from his own life. The structure and plot of The Author's Farce are similar to those of George Farquhar's Love and a Bottle (1698), in that both plays describe the relationship between an author and his landlady. The plays only deal with the same generalised idea however; the particulars of each are different. Fielding also drew on the Scriblerus Club's use of satire and the humour common to traditional Restoration and Augustan drama. Many of Luckless's situations are similar to those found within various traditional British dramas, including Buckingham's The Rehearsal (1672), a satirical play about staging a play. It is possible that Pope's Dunciad Variorum, published on 13 March 1729, influenced the themes of the play and the plot of the puppet show. The Court of Nonsense in the puppet show are related to the Court of Dulness in The Dunciad and the Court of Nonsense in John Dryden's Mac Flecknoe. The Scriblerus Club style of humour as a whole influences The Author's Farce, and it is possible that Fielding borrowed from Gay's Three Hours after Marriage (1717) and The Beggar's Opera (1728). In turn, Fielding's play influenced later Scriblerus Club works, especially Pope's fourth book of his revised Dunciad and possibly Gay's The Rehearsal at Goatham.

== Performance history and publication ==
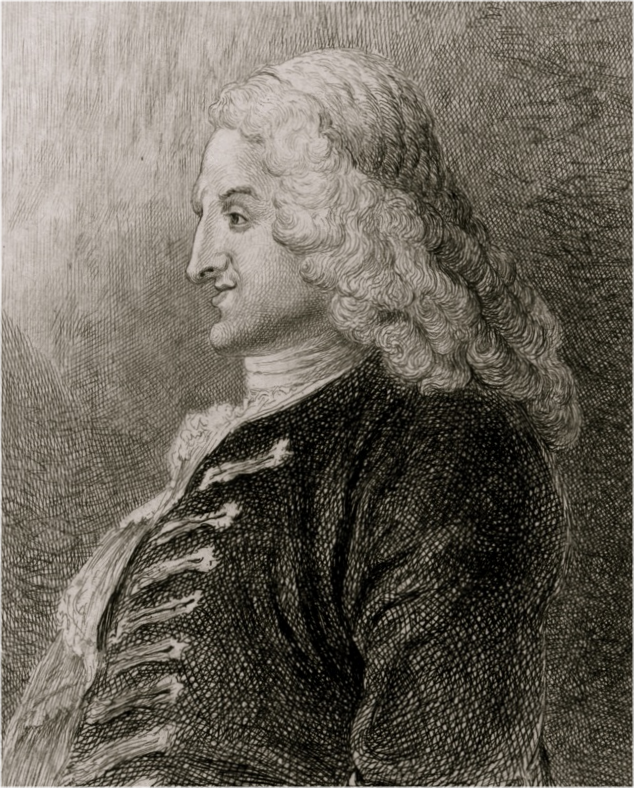
Henry Fielding

The Author's Farce and the Pleasures of the Town was written during 1729. The first press announcement of the play appeared on 18 March 1730 in the Daily Post, stating that it was in rehearsal. An advertisement appeared in the same newspaper shortly afterwards mentioning restricted seating and high ticket prices, suggesting that the play was expected to be a popular entertainment. It opened on Easter Monday, 30 March 1730, at the Little Theatre, Haymarket, and shortly thereafter was billed alongside The Cheats of Scapin. The last act was later made into the companion piece to Hurlothrumbo for one show.

Fielding altered and rewrote The Author's Farce for its second run beginning on 21 April 1730, when it shared the bill with his earlier play Tom Thumb. This combination continued through May and June and was later billed for a revival on 3 July 1730. Starting on 1 August 1730, the third act of The Author's Farce was revived by the Little Theatre during the week of the Tottenham Court fair. On 17 October 1730 an advertisement in the Daily Post announced that a new prologue was to be added. A version without the prologue followed before the play's run ended, to be replaced by The Beggar's Wedding by Charles Coffey. The Author's Farce was briefly revived in November 1730 and January 1731, but only the first two acts of the play were shown. It was paired with the afterpiece Damon and Phillida, which was later replaced by The Jealous Taylor in January 1731. Performances continued into February and March 1731. Productions in 1732 included a new prologue, now lost, that had been added for the 10 May 1731 performance.

On 31 March 1731, The Author's Farce was paired with the Tom Thumb remake, The Tragedy of Tragedies, as a replacement for The Letter Writers, the original companion piece. Although both Tragedy of Tragedies and The Author's Farce were main shows, they alternated on the billing until the 18 June 1731 performance, the final showing of any Fielding play in the Little Theatre except for a 12 May 1732 benefit show of The Author's Farce. The last documented non-puppet version was performed on 28 March 1748 by Theophilus Cibber as a two-act companion piece for a benefit show. The Pleasures of the Town act was performed as a one-act play outside London throughout the century, including a 15-show run at Norwich in 1749 and during the 1750s, and a production at York during the 1751–52 theatre season. Additionally, there were benefit shows that included the third act at a variety of locations, including Dublin, on 19 December 1763 and Edinburgh in 1763. There were also many performances of the puppet theatre versions, including a travelling show by Thomas Yeates, titled Punch's Oratory, or The Pleasures of the Town, which started in 1734.

In response to the Actor Rebellion of 1733, Fielding produced a revised version of The Author's Farce, incorporating a new prologue and epilogue. Performed at the Theatre Royal, it was advertised in the Daily Journal, opening with an inferior replacement cast for some of the important characters. It was joined by The Intriguing Chambermaid and The Harlot's Progress. These were the only performances of the revised version, which was printed together with The Intriguing Chambermade (1734) and included a letter by an unknown writer, possibly Fielding himself. The 1734 edition of the play was printed in 1750, and it was used for all later publications until 1966. Printed texts of the play were included in Arthur Murphy's 1762 Works of Henry Fielding and George Saintsbury's 1893 Works of Henry Fielding. The latter includes The Author's Farce along with only two other plays. The 1903 Works of Henry Fielding, edited by G. H. Maynadier, included only the first two acts. Only three scenes were included in Alfred Howard's The Beauties of Fielding, which collected passages from Fielding's works. George Saintsbury included The Author's Farce and two other plays in a Fielding collected edition of 1893, but ignored the others.

== Critical response ==
The success of The Author's Farce established Fielding as a London playwright; writing in 1998, Harold Pagliaro describes the play as Fielding's "first great success". Catherine Ingrassia, in 2004, attributes its popularity to Fielding's satirical attack on the archetypal woman writer, specifically Haywood. Among contemporary accounts the Daily Post of 2 May 1730 reported that the play received universal approval, and on 6 May that seats were in great demand. The 7 May issue of the Grub Street Journal noted that the play was popular among "Persons of Quality"; many notable figures attended the show, including on the first night John Perceval, 1st Earl of Egmont, and Frederick, Prince of Wales, whose presence was mentioned in the 28 April 1730 London Evening Post and the 15 May 1730 Daily Post. The only surviving comments from any of those who saw the play come from the diary of the Earl of Egmont, who reported that The Author's Farce and Tom Thumb "are a ridicule on poets, several of their works, as also of operas, etc., and the last of our modern tragedians, and are exceedingly full of humour, with some wit."

The play was hardly discussed at all during the 18th century, and the 19th century mostly followed the same trend. A chapter on the play is included in Frederick Lawrence's Life of Fielding (1855), and it is mentioned by Leslie Stephen and Austin Dobson, who focus on what the play says about Grub Street and Fielding. Most later critics agree with Dobson's judgement that the play primarily provides a commentary on events in Fielding's life, and marks his transition from older forms of comedy to the new satire of his contemporaries. Charles Woods, writing in 1966, argues that The Author's Farce was an integral part of Fielding's career, and dismisses a political reading of the work. Some years earlier, in 1918, Wilbur Lucius Cross had held that the play revealed Fielding's talent for writing farces and burlesques. Writing in 1993, Martin and Ruthe Battestin maintain that the play "was [Fielding's] first experiment in the irregular comic modes ... where his true genius as a playwright at last found scope". They further assert that Fielding was the first to offer audiences "a kind of pointed, inventive foolery", and that his talent for "ridicule and brisk dialogue" and for devising "absurd yet expressionistic plots" was unmatched even in 20th-century theatre. Earlier, Frederick Homes Dudden, had described the puppet show in the third act as "a highly original satire on the theatrical and quasi-theatrical amusements of the day." F. W. Bateson included the play in his 1963 list of "satirical extravaganzas".

J. Paul Hunter, in his 1975 comparison of Fielding's theatrical style and form, notes that while "many of the literary and theatrical jibes are witty," the slow pacing and lack of dramatic conflict make the play seem "essentially untheatrical". Pat Rogers disagrees, reasoning that "Few livelier theatrical occasions can ever have been seen than the original runs of The Author's Farce, with their mixture of broad comedy, personal satire, tuneful scenes and rapid action." Robert Hume, in 1988, comments that the literary structure of The Author's Farce is "ramshackle but effective", although he considers that "Fielding's parody of recognition scenes is done with verve" and "the 'realistic' part of the show is a clever combination of the straightforward and the ironic." Writing in 1998, Thomas Lockwood explains various aspects that make the play great, putting particular emphasis on the "musical third act", which he believes "shows a gift for brilliant theatrical arrangement". Lockwood praises the play's conclusion in particular, and the ever-increasing tempo of events following Murdertext's "explosive invasion".

== Cast ==
=== 1730 cast ===
Play:

- Harry Luckless – playwright, played by Mr. Mullart (William Mullart)
- Harriot Moneywood – daughter of Mrs. Moneywood, played by Miss Palms
- Mrs Moneywood – Luckless's landlady, played by Mrs. Mullart (Elizabeth Mullart)
- Witmore – played by Mr. Lacy (James Lacy)
- Marplay – played by Mr. Reynolds
- Sparkish – played by Mr. Stopler
- Bookweight – played by Mr. Jones
- Scarecrow – played by Mr. Marshal
- Dash – played by Mr. Hallam
- Quibble – played by Mr. Dove
- Blotpage – played by Mr. Wells junior
- Jack – Luckless's servant, played by Mr. Achurch
- Jack-Pudding – played by Mr. Reynolds
- Bantomite – played by Mr. Marshal

Internal puppet show:

- Player – by Mr. Dove
- Constable – by Mr. Wells
- Murder-text – by Mr. Hallam
- Goddess of Nonsense – by Mrs. Mullart
- Charon – by Mr. Ayres
- Curry – by Mr. Dove
- A Poet – by Mr. W. Hallam
- Signior Opera – by Mr. Stopler
- Don Tragedio – by Mr. Marshal
- Sir Farcical Comick – by Mr. Davenport
- Dr. Orator – by Mr. Jones
- Monsieur Pantomime – by Mr. Knott
- Mrs. Novel – by Mrs. Martin
- Robgrave – by Mr. Harris
- Saylor – by Mr. Achurch
- Somebody – by Mr. Harris junior
- Nobody – by Mr. Wells junior
- Punch – by Mr. Hicks
- Lady Kingcall – by Miss Clarke
- Mrs. Cheat'em – by Mrs. Wind
- Mrs. Glass-rin – by Mrs. Blunt
- Prologue spoken by Mr. Jones
- Epilogue spoken by four poets, a player and a cat
- 1st Poet – played by Mr. Jones
- 2nd Poet – played by Mr. Dove
- 3rd Poet – played by Mr. Marshall
- 4th Poet – played by Mr. Wells junior
- Player – played by Miss Palms
- Cat – played by Mrs. Martin

=== 1734 altered cast ===
Play:

- Index – unlisted actor

Internal puppet show:

- Count Ugly – unlisted actor
- Prologue spoken by Mrs. Clive
- Epilogue spoken by Mrs. Clive
