= Amelia (novel) =

1751 novel by Henry Fielding

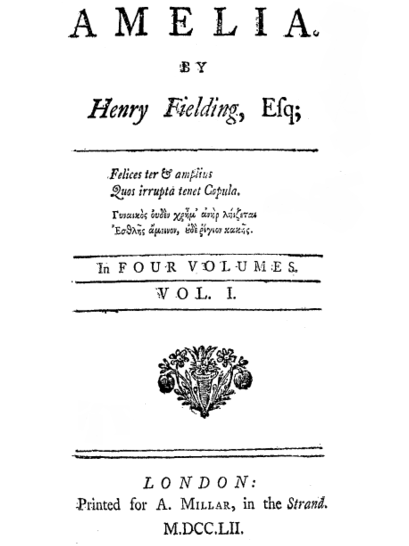
Title page of Amelia

Amelia is a sentimental novel written by Henry Fielding and published in December 1751. It was the fourth and final novel written by Fielding, and it was printed in only one edition while the author was alive, although 5,000 copies were published of the first edition. Amelia follows the life of Amelia and Captain William Booth after they are married. It contains many allusions to classical literature and focuses on the theme of marriage and feminine intelligence, but Fielding's stance on gender issues cannot be determined because of the lack of authorial commentary discussing the matter. Although the novel received praise from many writers and critics, it received more criticism from Fielding's competition, possibly resulting from the "paper war" in which the author was involved.

== Background ==
Fielding began writing Amelia in the autumn of 1749. He turned to his own life for inspiration, and the main character, Amelia, was possibly modelled on Fielding's first wife, Charlotte, who died in November 1744. Likewise, the hero, Captain Booth, was partly modelled after Fielding himself, as well as on the author's father, General Edmund Fielding, famous for his careless management of his family's money. It has recently been argued that, on account of his name and the dramatic nature of the character itself, Billy Booth also owes a debt to Barton Booth, a famous tragic actor of the early eighteenth century.

"Amelia" was advertised on 2 December 1751 by the publisher, Andrew Millar, in The General Advertiser. In it, Millar claimed that "to satisfy the earnest Demand of the Publick, this Work is now printing at four Presses; but the Proprietor not-withstanding finds it impossible to get them bound in Time without spoiling the Beauty of the Impression, and therefore will sell them sew'd at Half a Guinea a Sett."

Millar ordered William Strahan to print the work on two of his printing presses to produce a total of 5,000 copies for the first run of the work (in comparison, only 3,500 copies of The History of Tom Jones, a Foundling were printed for the first and second edition). This amount proved to be enough for Millar to sell, although he had to back down from a second printing of 3,000 copies immediately after the first edition to ensure that the originals were completely sold. The work had two German translations published in 1752, a Dutch translation in 1756, and a French edition in 1762.

It finally went into a second edition in 1762. However, this edition was posthumous and in Millar's Works of Henry Fielding. In the prefatory essay, the Works editor, Arthur Murphy, claimed that "Amelia, in this edition, is printed from a copy corrected by the author's own hand. The exceptionable passages, which inadvertency had thrown out, are here retrenched; and the work, upon the whole, will be found nearer perfection than it was in its original state." Although most critics agree that Murphy was telling the truth, it is possible that only some of the alterations were completed by Fielding and that other alterations were by Murphy or another editor employed by Murphy.

== Plot summary ==
Amelia is a domestic novel taking place largely in London during 1733. It describes the hardships suffered by a young couple newly married. Against her mother's wishes, Amelia marries Captain William Booth, a dashing young army officer. The couple run away to London. In Book II, William is unjustly imprisoned in Newgate, and is subsequently seduced by Miss Matthews. During this time, it is revealed that Amelia was in a carriage accident and that her nose was ruined. Although this brings about jokes at Amelia's expense, Booth refuses to regard her as anything but beautiful.

Amelia, by contrast, resists the attentions paid to her by several men in William's absence and stays faithful to him. She forgives his transgression, but William soon draws them into trouble again as he accrues gambling debts trying to lift the couple out of poverty. He soon finds himself in debtors' prison. Amelia then discovers that she is her mother's heiress and, the debt being settled, William is released and the couple retires to the country.

The second edition contains many changes to the text. A whole chapter on a dispute between doctors was completely removed, along with various sections of dialogue and praise of the Glastonbury Waters. The edition also contains many new passages, such as an addition of a scene in which a doctor repairs Amelia's nose and Booth remarking on the surgery (in Book II, Chapter 1, where Booth is talking to Miss Matthews).

== Themes ==
=== Virgilian ===
There are strong Virgilian overtones in Amelia. Fielding claimed, in his 28 January The Covent Garden Journal, that there were connections of the work to both Homer and Virgil, but that the "learned Reader will see that the latter was the noble model, which I made use of on this Occasion." The parallels are between more than the plot, and the novel follows a "twelve-book structure" that matches the Aeneid.

Even the characters have Virgilian counterparts, with Booth being comparable to Aeneas and Miss Mathews Fielding's version of Dido. Fielding does not shy away from such comparisons, but embraces them with his use of the line "Furens quid Foemina possit" (translated as "what a woman can do in frenzy"), in Book IV, Chapter Five; this line is directly taken from the Aeneid. Likewise, Fielding's bailiff misstates Virgil's "dolus an virtus, quis in hoste requirat" (translated as "whether deceit or valour, who would ask in the enemy") when he says "Bolus and Virtus, quis in a Hostess equirit" in Book VIII, Chapter One. However, these are not the only quotes, and Fielding cites many passages of Latin and Greek while not providing direct translations for them. To these Virgilian parallels, Samuel Richardson claimed that Fielding "must mean Cotton's Virgil Travestied; where the women are drabs, and the men scoundrels."

=== Feminine intelligence ===
Although the novel deals with marriage and life after marriage, it also gives the "histories" of Miss Matthews and Mrs Bennet (later Mrs Atkinson). It is the second story, that of Mrs Atkinson, which demonstrates feminine intellect. According to her story, she received her understanding of the classics from her father. To demonstrate her knowledge, she quotes from the Aeneid, an action that Fielding describes, in Book VI, Chapter 8, as her performing "with so strong an Emphasis, that she almost frightened Amelia out of her Wits." However, Fielding follows that by claiming she spoke on "that great Absurdity, (for so she termed it,) of excluding Women from Learning; for which they were equally qualified with the Men, and in which so many had made so notable a Proficiency" and this idea was not accepted by either Amelia or Mrs. Booth. Unlike the two women, Dr Harrison criticises Mrs Atkinson and declares, in Book X, Chapter One, that women are "incapable of Learning."

A dispute forms between the various characters on the issue, and Sergeant Atkinson, Mrs Atkinson's husband, tries to stop the fight. Although his words provoke a harsh reaction from his wife, they soon come to accept each other's intellectual capabilities. However, Mrs Atkinson's status as a woman educated in the classics and as an advocate for other women to be educated, could have provoked deeper tension between herself and her husband. Her feminine intellect was described by Jill Campbell as a "threatening" force which her husband once reacted violently against, even though his violence was contained to him acting on it only in a dream-like state. The actual nature of the plot lacks a certainty that would allow an overall stance on women's issues to be determined, and it is not even certain as to where Fielding stood on the issue. His lack of authorial comments seems to reinforce a possible "anxieties about gender confusion" in the plot, and the characters' sexual identities are blurred; the dispute between Mrs Atkinson and Dr Harrison continues until the very end of the novel. Fielding did not comment on the gender roles, but Richardson's friend, Anne Donnellan, did, and she asked, "must we suppose that if a woman knows a little Greek and Latin she must be a drunkard, and virago?"

== Critical response ==
John Cleland was one of the first reviewers of the novel, and in the December 1751 Monthly Review, claimed the work as "the boldest stroke that has yet been attempted in this species of writing" and that Fielding "takes up his heroine at the very point at which all his predecessors have dropped their capital personages." However, he also stated that parts of the novel "stand in need of an apology." A review in the London Magazine in the same month claimed that there were too many anachronisms. This piece was also the first to mention Amelia's nose, and on it the writer claims that Fielding "should have taken care to have had Amelia's nose so compleatly cured, and set to rights, after it being beat all to pieces, by the help of some eminent surgeon, that not so much as a scar remained." John Hill soon attacked Amelia in the London Daily Advertiser on 8 January 1752 where he claimed that the book's title character "could charm the World without the Help of a Nose."

During this time, personal works, such as Fielding's Amelia, became targets for a "paper war" between various London writers. Fielding was quick to respond, and on 11 January 1752 in a piece published in The Covent-Garden Journal, he ironically stated: "a famous Surgeon, who absolutely cured one Mrs Amelia Booth, of a violent Hurt in her Nose, insomuch, that she had scarce a Scar left on it, intends to bring Actions against several ill-meaning and slanderous People, who have reported that the said Lady had no Nose, merely because the Author of her History, in a Hurry, forgot to inform his Readers of that Particular." However, Hill was not the only one to attack during this time; Bonnell Thornton wrote satires of Amelia in the Drury-Lane Journal. Thornton's satires were first published on 16 January 1752 and included a fake advertisement for a parody novel called "Shamelia", playing off of title of Fielding's parody Shamela. He later parodied the work on 13 February 1752 in a piece called "A New Chapter in Amelia." Tobias Smollett joined in and published the pamphlet Habbakkuk Hilding anonymously on 15 January 1752. Although there was much criticism, there was some support for the work, and an anonymous pamphlet was written to attack "Hill and 'the Town'" and praise the novel. On 25 January 1752, Fielding defended his work again by bringing the novel before the imaginary "Court of Censorial Enquiry", in which the prosecutors are Hill and the other critics and it is they, not Amelia that are truly put on trial.

Fielding's rival, Samuel Richardson, declared in February 1752 that the novel "is as dead as if it had been published forty years ago, as to sale." Previously, he attacked the "lowness" of the novel and claimed that "his brawls, his jarrs, his gaols, his spunging-houses, are all drawn from what he has seen and known." However, Richardson also claimed to have never read Amelia but, years later, Sir Walter Scott argued that Amelia was "a continuation of Tom Jones." The second edition of Amelia was criticized for its various changes to the text. Some aspects of the revision, such as removing of Fielding's Universal Register Office, were seen as "damaging" the work, although they were intended to remove anachronisms. In The Bible in Spain (1843) George Borrow, describing his first visit to Lisbon, wrote: "Let travellers devote one entire morning to inspecting the Arcos and the Mai das Agoas, after which they may repair to the English church and cemetery, Pere-la-chaise in miniature, where, if they be of England, they may well be excused if they kiss the cold tomb, as I did, of the author of Amelia, the most singular genius which their island ever produced, whose works it has long been the fashion to abuse in public and to read in secret."

In recent years, critics have examined various aspects of the novel that were previous ignored; on the Virgilian images in Amelia, Ronald Paulson claimed that they "elevate the domestic (marriage) plot and to connect it with public issues of a degenerating society and nation." However, those like Peter Sabor do not agree that the themes create "an elevating experience".
