= James Lacy (actor) =

British actor and theatre manager

James Lacy (1696–1774) was a British stage actor and theatre manager.

He joined John Rich's company at the Lincoln's Inn Fields Theatre in 1724. His wife acted alongside him, and together they appeared in the premiere of John Gay's The Beggar's Opera as Robin of Bagshot and Dolly Trull respectively. During the 1730s, he collaborated with Henry Fielding, appearing as Witmore in his The Author's Farce and working with him at Bartholomew Fair. He got in trouble for producing plays illegally following the passage of a new Licensing Act in 1737.

By 1744, Lacy was manager of the Drury Lane Theatre where he clashed with actor David Garrick leading Garrick to leave the company for several years. In 1747, they reconciled and became co-managers of Drury Lane. In later years he owned a mansion called Lacy House, located close to the Thames in Isleworth.

== Bibliography ==
- Highfill, Philip H, Burnim, Kalman A. & Langhans, Edward A. A Biographical Dictionary of Actors, Actresses, Musicians, Dancers, Managers, and Other Stage Personnel in London, 1660-1800: Garrick to Gyngell. SIU Press, 1978.
- Straub, Kristina, G. Anderson, Misty and O'Quinn, Daniel . The Routledge Anthology of Restoration and Eighteenth-Century Drama. Taylor & Francis, 2017.
