= The Letter Writers =

The Letter Writers Or, a New Way to Keep a Wife at Home is a play by Henry Fielding and was first performed on 24 March 1731 at Haymarket with its companion piece The Tragedy of Tragedies. It is about two merchants who strive to keep their wives faithful. Their efforts are unsuccessful, however, until they catch the man who their wives are cheating with.

The play, a farce dealing with sex and adultery, was a failure. While Fielding avoided the traditional cliches of the genre, he lost the moral purpose. Critics disagree over the quality of the play, but most agree that the missing moral purpose is the key failure of the play.

== Background ==
The Letter Writers Or, a New Way to Keep a Wife at Home, a three-act farcical play, was first mentioned in the 12 February 1731 Daily Post, which announced that the play would start in March. It first ran on 24 March 1731, and it ran for four nights as a companion piece with The Tragedy of Tragedies. It failed as a play, and The Welsh Opera replaced The Letter Writers as the companion piece to The Tragedy of Tragedies on 22 April 1731.

It was advertised for print in the 23 March Daily Post and first printed 24 March for opening night. It was printed by James Roberts with John Watts, even though only Roberts's name appeared on any of the notices, on the same day as The Tragedy of Tragedies. There is a difference in quality between the printed version of The Letter-Writers and other plays, including The Tragedy of Tragedies. The play was printed with less care and includes many mistakes in the text along with other errors.

== Cast ==
Cast list according to the original printed billing:

- Mr Wisdom – played by Mr. Jones
- Mrs Wisdom – played by Mrs. Lacy
- Mr Softly – played by Mr. Hallam
- Mrs Softly – played by Mrs. Mullart
- Rakel – officer, played by Mr. Lacy
- Risque – Rakel's servant, played by Mr. Reynolds
- Commons – friend of Rakel, played by Mr. Mullart
- John – played by Mr. Wathan
- Sneaksby – played by Mr. Davenport
- Betty – played by Mrs. Stokes
- Other characters include Constable, Whores, Fidlers, Servants, and others

== Plot ==
The play revolves around two old merchants named Mr Wisdom and Mr Softly. Each has a young wife and the two men are afraid that their wives will run off with other men. They determine to send a threatening letter to the other's wife to scare them into staying. The letters do not work, and Mrs Softly spends her time pursuing men about town while Mrs Wisdom stays at home with Rakel, an officer. While with Rakel, Mrs Wisdom is almost caught by Mr Wisdom but she is able to sneak him into a closet. Mrs Softly does not have a closet, and she is caught with Rakel by her husband. After great lengths, she is able to convince him that she was not intimate with Rakel; Rakel pretends to be a criminal and Risque helps reinforce the lie. However, she is later discovered with Rakel by Mrs Wisdom after Commons, a friend of Rakel's, comes in drunk and reveals where Rakel was hiding.

== Themes ==
The theme of the play is dealing with sex and adultery. However, Fielding ignores many traditional cliches that are part of the sex-comedy farce, which causes him to lose out on emphasising any moral purpose. Instead, Fielding avoids morality and moral the play instead forgives characters, such as sucRisque, who don't seem to deserve forgiveness through the play. In this play, along with The Temple Beau, Rape Upon Rape, and The Grub-Street Opera, Fielding relies on letters to further the plot.

Other connections between The Letter Writers and other works by Fielding include Fielding's reliance on the events of his day, public or personal, and his ability to take plain events and find humour within them. In the play, the use of writing letters to intimidate people occurred frequently during the early 1730s. However, the play is different from his other works because it is truly "Farce" whereas many of his other works are more ballad opera than farce. In terms of characters, Mrs Softly is, according to Ronald Paulson, "the first of the vocal and central young women who emerge from Fielding's Moliere plays" and serves as the focus for the play.

== Sources ==
The idea of using letters to extort money became well known after George Packer, a shipbuilder, was threatened during September 1730. When he did not comply, his house was destroyed by arson on 4 October 1730. His story became well known after reported in various newspapers and others started to copy the extortion attempt. Newspapers began to report on various attempts at extortion and London was filled with general concern over the letters.

It is possible that Fielding drew inspiration from a threatening letter sent to Lady Diana Fielding, his second cousin. The letter was dated 29 October 1730, and was just one of many sent to rich people during the early 1730s to intimidate the rich and extort money. There is also a connection between the way The Letter Writers depicts cuckolding with Edward Ravenscroft's The London Cuckolds (1681), although Ravenscroft relied on three couples instead of Fielding's two.

== Critical response ==
There are no contemporary accounts of the play besides it being a failure. According to Thomas Lockwood, removing The Letter-Writers from the billing "was a forced decision, made necessary because the afterpiece was dragging down the programme—not an easy accomplishment, where the programme was headed by The Tragedy of Tragedies" Allardy Nicolls believes that, in regards to The Letter-Writers, "Of all eighteenth century farces, Fielding's is perhaps the best". Robert Hume disagrees with Nicoll's assessment and instead believes that the play's "gimmick is a good one" but it "is ineptly handled".

F. Homes Dudden notes how The Letter Writers is truly a farce unlike Fielding's other works, but he points out that the play "was too conventional to excite much interest." The Battesins believe that "Slight as it is and unsuccessful, The Letter-Writers is worth noting for the clarity with which it exemplifies certain characteristics of Fielding's work as a comic author." Harold Pagliaro believes that "Despite the happy idea of the husbands' letters and the possibilities they generate, the play misses as farce or burlesque, because the outrageous behaviour we have been promised, at least implicitly, never comes to pass. A certain audacity is wanting."
