= Henry Fielding =

English writer and judge (1707–1754)

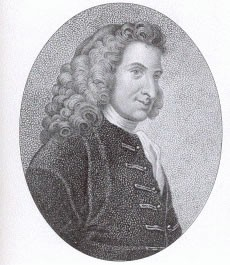
- Born: 22 April 1707; Sharpham, Somerset, England
- Died: 8 October 1754 (aged 47); Lisbon, Kingdom of Portugal
- Education: Eton College
- Occupation: Writer
- Relatives: Sarah Fielding, John Fielding
- Writing career
- Pen name: "Captain Hercules Vinegar", "H. Scriblerus Secundus"; some work published anonymously
- Period: 1728–1754
- Genres: Comedy, satire, picaresque
- Movements: Enlightenment, Augustan Age

Henry Fielding (22 April 1707 – 8 October 1754) was an English writer and judge known for the use of humour and satire in his works. His famous novels include Shamela (1741), Joseph Andrews (1742), The History of Tom Jones, a Foundling (1749) and Amelia (1751). Along with Samuel Richardson, Fielding is seen as the founder of the traditional English novel. As well as being a novelist, Fielding was also a playwright, known for his satirical comedies The Author's Farce (1730), Tom Thumb (1730), The Letter Writers (1731) and The Tragedy of Tragedies (1731). He also played an important role in the history of law enforcement in the United Kingdom, using his authority as a magistrate to found the Bow Street Runners, London's first professional police force.

== Early life ==
Henry Fielding was born on 22 April 1707 at Sharpham Park, the seat of his mother's family in Sharpham, Somerset. He was the son of Lt.-Gen. Edmund Fielding and Sarah Gould, daughter of Sir Henry Gould. A scion of the Earl of Denbigh, his father was nephew of William Fielding, 3rd Earl of Denbigh.

Educated at Eton College, Fielding began a lifelong friendship with William Pitt the Elder. His mother died when he was 11. A suit for custody was brought by his grandmother against his charming but irresponsible father, Lt Gen. Edmund Fielding. The settlement placed Henry in his grandmother's care, but he continued to see his father in London.

In 1725, Henry tried to abduct his cousin Sarah Andrews, with whom he was infatuated, while she was on her way to church. He fled to avoid prosecution.

In 1728, Fielding travelled to Leiden to study classics and law at the university. Penury forced him back to London, where he began writing for the theatre. Some of his work savagely criticised the government of Prime Minister Sir Robert Walpole.

== Dramatist and novelist ==
Returning from his studies at Leiden late in 1729, Fielding “came up to London … thrown upon his own resources” and determined to earn his living by the pen. Early the next year he enlisted fellow writer James Ralph to provide the prologue for his comedy The Temple Beau (licensed January 1730). Ralph’s recently published miscellany The Touch-Stone; or, The Taste of the Town (1728; re-issued 1731) urged dramatists to abandon imported opera and classical heroes in favour of “home-bred” stories, mocked the vogue for “merry Tragedies,” and celebrated the satirical possibilities of puppet shows and fair-ground spectacle.

Fielding’s response was almost instantaneous. The Author’s Farce; or, The Pleasures of the Town opened at the Haymarket on 30 March 1730 with a concluding puppet-show whose dramatis personae—Don Tragedio, Signior Opera, Monsieur Pantomime, Mrs Novel, Punch and Jack Pudding—mirror the catalogue in Ralph’s treatise. Its dialogue repeats Ralph’s gibes at Bartholomew and Southwark fairs and even alludes to the recent “rabbit-woman” hoax of 1726. Barely a month later, on 24 April 1730, Fielding produced the two-act afterpiece Tom Thumb (expanded in 1731 as The Tragedy of Tragedies). Echoing Ralph’s programme, the preface hails “home-bred Subjects,” the prologue ridicules tragedies that aim chiefly to raise laughter, and the play itself casts a diminutive hero amid outsized props while repeating the comic story of the protagonist “dropp’d in a pudding.” These two farces mark Fielding’s decisive pivot from polite comedy to the satirical burlesque that would dominate his dramatic output throughout the 1730s and shape the ironic voice of his later novels.

According to George R. Levine, Henry Fielding, in his first writings used two forms of "rhetorical poses" that were popular during the eighteenth century. Henry Fielding would construct "the non-ironic pseudonym such as Addison and Steele used in the Spectator, and the ironic mask or Persona, such as Swift used in A Modest Proposal." The Theatrical Licensing Act 1737 is said to be a direct response to his activities in writing for the theatre. Although the play that triggered the act was the unproduced, anonymously authored The Golden Rump, Fielding's dramatic satires had set the tone. Once it was passed, political satire on stage became all but impossible. Fielding retired from the theatre and resumed his legal career to support his wife Charlotte Craddock and two children by becoming a barrister, joining the Middle Temple in 1737 and being called to the bar there in 1740.

Fielding's lack of financial acumen meant the family often endured periods of poverty, but they were helped by Ralph Allen, a wealthy benefactor, on whom Squire Allworthy in Tom Jones would be based. Allen went on to provide for the education and support of Fielding's children after the writer's death.

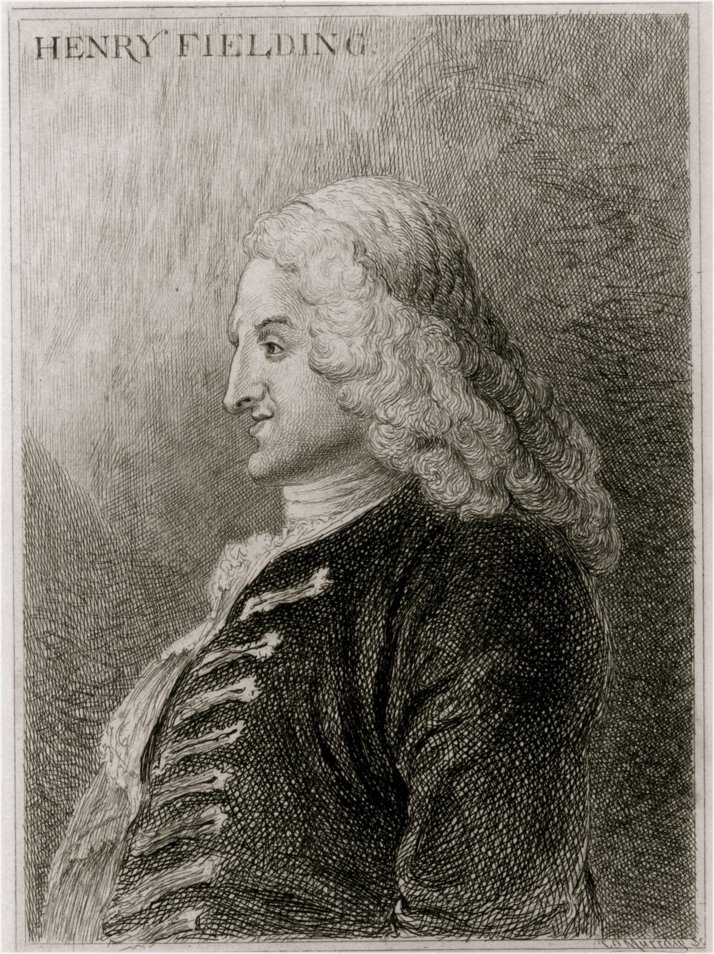
Henry Fielding, about 1743, etching from Jonathan Wild

Fielding never stopped writing political satire and satires of current arts and letters. Issued in 1731, the printed play The Tragedy of Tragedies—for which William Hogarth supplied a celebrated frontispiece—proved especially popular. Published under the pseudonym “H. Scriblerus Secundus”, a pseudonym intended to link himself ideally with the Scriblerus Club of literary satirists founded by Jonathan Swift, Alexander Pope and John Gay. He also contributed several works to journals.

From 1734 to 1739, Fielding wrote anonymously for the leading Tory periodical, The Craftsman, against the Prime Minister, Sir Robert Walpole. His patron was the opposition Whig MP George Lyttelton, a boyhood friend from Eton to whom he later dedicated Tom Jones. Lyttelton followed his leader Lord Cobham in forming a Whig opposition to Walpole's government called the Cobhamites, which included another of Fielding's Eton friends, William Pitt. In The Craftsman, Fielding voiced an opposition attack on bribery and corruption in British politics. Despite writing for the opposition to Walpole, which included Tories as well as Whigs, Fielding was "unshakably a Whig" and often praised Whig heroes such as the Duke of Marlborough and Gilbert Burnet.

Fielding dedicated his play Don Quixote in England to the opposition Whig leader Lord Chesterfield. It appeared on 17 April 1734, the same day writs were issued for the general election. He dedicated his 1735 play The Universal Gallant to Charles Spencer, 3rd Duke of Marlborough, a political follower of Chesterfield. The other prominent opposition paper, Common Sense, founded by Chesterfield and Lyttelton, was named after a character in Fielding's Pasquin (1736). Fielding wrote at least two articles for it in 1737 and 1738.

Fielding continued to air political views in satirical journalism in the late 1730s and early 1740s. He co-founded and initially edited the thrice-weekly The Champion; or, British Mercury (launched 15 November 1739), writing under the persona “Captain Hercules Vinegar”; from April 1740 it appeared as Champion; or, Evening Advertiser. Fielding remained principal editor until June 1741, when James Ralph succeeded him; the paper continued until 31 August 1742.

After stepping down from the paper, Fielding turned to prose fiction. In response to the popularity of Samuel Richardson’s Pamela, he issued the anonymous parody Shamela, his first success in the new form.

Fielding followed this with Joseph Andrews (1742), an original work supposedly dealing with Pamela's brother, Joseph. His purpose was more than parody, for as stated in the preface, he intended a "kind of writing which I do not remember to have seen hitherto attempted in our language." In what Fielding called a "comic epic poem in prouse", he blended two classical traditions: that of the epic, which had been poetic, and that of the drama, but emphasizing the comic rather than the tragic. Another distinction of Joseph Andrews and the novels to come was use of everyday reality of character and action, as opposed to the fables of the past. While begun as a parody, it developed into an accomplished novel in its own right and is seen as Fielding's debut as a serious novelist.

In 1743, he published a novel in the Miscellanies volume III, which was the first volume of the Miscellanies: The Life and Death of Jonathan Wild, the Great, which is sometimes counted as his first, as he almost certainly began it before he wrote Shamela and Joseph Andrews. It is a satire of Walpole equating him and Jonathan Wild, the gang leader and highwayman. He implicitly compares the Whig party in Parliament with a gang of thieves run by Walpole, whose constant desire to be a "Great Man", a common epithet with Walpole, ought to culminate in the antithesis of greatness: hanging.

The Roast Beef of Old England
Henry Fielding wrote the text for "The Roast Beef of Old England", whose tune is used by both the Royal Navy and the United States Marine Corps, in 1731. Richard Leveridge later arranged it. This version is performed by the United States Navy Band.

Fielding's anonymous The Female Husband (1746) fictionalizes a case in which a female transvestite was tried for duping another woman into marriage. This was one of several small pamphlets costing sixpence. Though a minor piece in his life's work, it reflects his preoccupation with fraud, shamming and masks.

His greatest work is The History of Tom Jones, a Foundling (1749), a meticulous comic novel with elements of the picaresque and the Bildungsroman, telling a convoluted tale of how a foundling came into a fortune. The novel tells of Tom's alienation from his foster father, Squire Allworthy, and his sweetheart, Sophia Western, and his reconciliation with them after lively and dangerous adventures on the road and in London. It triumphs as a presentation of English life and character in the mid-18th century. Every social type is represented and through them every shade of moral behaviour. Fielding's varied style tempers the basic seriousness of the novel and his authorial comment before each chapter adds a dimension to a conventional, straightforward narrative.

=== Sister ===
Fielding's younger sister, Sarah, also became a successful writer. Her novel The Governess, or The Little Female Academy (1749) is thought to be the first in English aimed expressly at children.

== Marriages ==
Fielding married Charlotte Craddock in 1734 at the Church of St Mary in Charlcombe, Somerset. She died in 1744, and he later modelled the heroines of Tom Jones and of Amelia on her. They had five children. Their only daughter Henrietta died at the age of 23, having already been "in deep decline" when she married a military engineer, James Gabriel Montresor, some months before. Three years after Charlotte's death, Fielding disregarded public opinion by marrying her former maid Mary Daniel, who was pregnant. Mary bore five children: three daughters who died young, and two sons, William and Allen.

== Jurist and magistrate ==
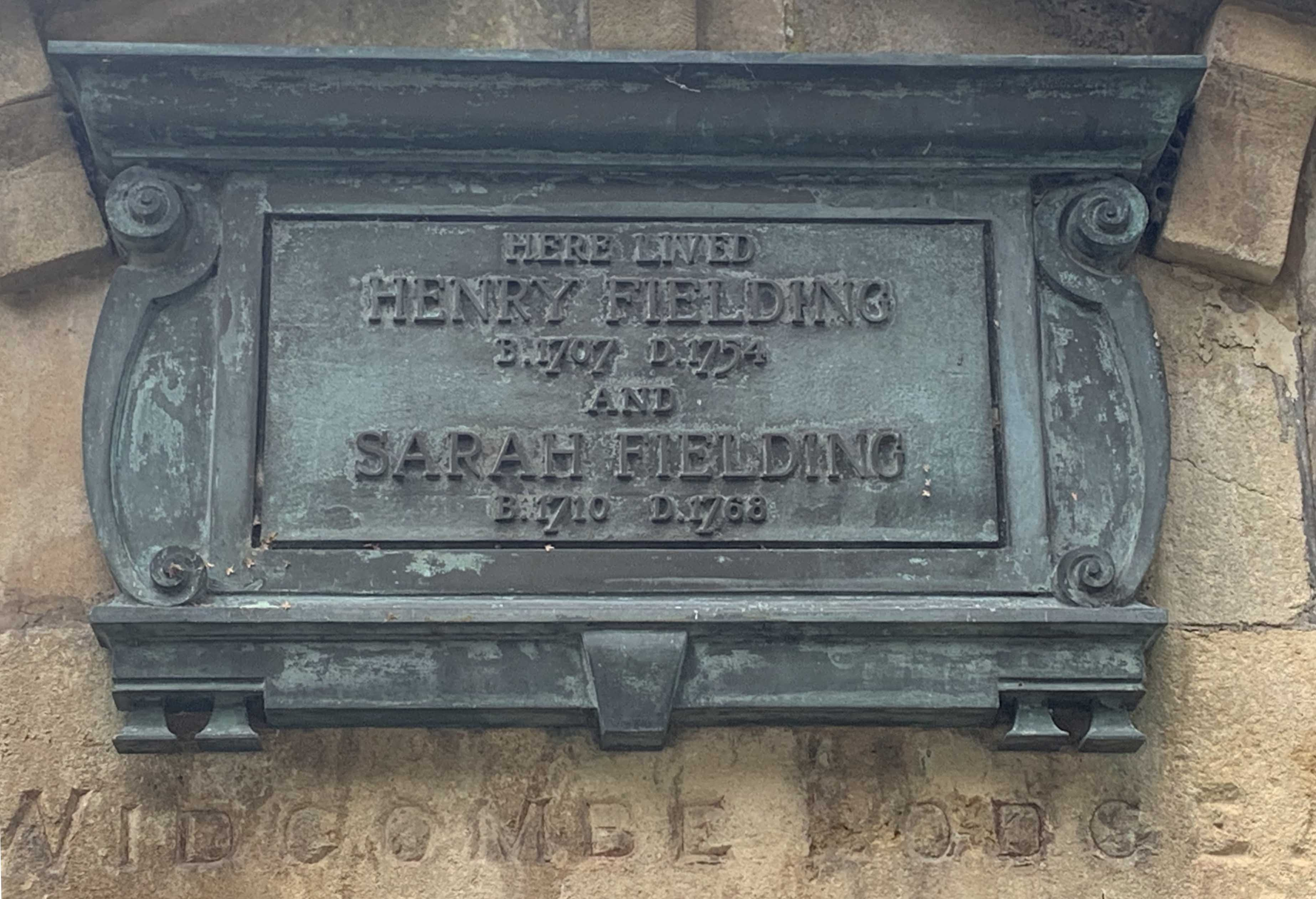
A Henry Fielding Memorial at Widcombe Lodge in Bath

Despite the scandal, Fielding's consistent anti-Jacobitism and support for the Church of England led to his appointment a year later as Westminster's chief magistrate, while his literary career went from strength to strength. Most of his work concerned London's criminal population of thieves, informers, gamblers and prostitutes. Though living in a corrupt and callous society, he became noted for impartial judgements, incorruptibility and compassion for those whom social inequities led into crime. The income from his office ("the dirtiest money upon earth") dwindled as he refused to take money from the very poor. Joined by his younger half-brother John, he helped found what some call London's first police force, the Bow Street Runners, in 1749.

According to the historian G. M. Trevelyan, the Fieldings were two of the best magistrates in 18th-century London, who did much to enhance judicial reform and improve prison conditions. Fielding's influential pamphlets and enquiries included a proposal for abolishing public hangings. This did not, however, imply opposition to capital punishment as such – as is evident, for example, in his presiding in 1751 over the trial of the notorious criminal James Field, finding him guilty in a robbery and sentencing him to hang. John Fielding, despite being blind by then, succeeded his older brother as chief magistrate, becoming known as the "Blind Beak of Bow Street" for his ability to recognise criminals by their voices alone.

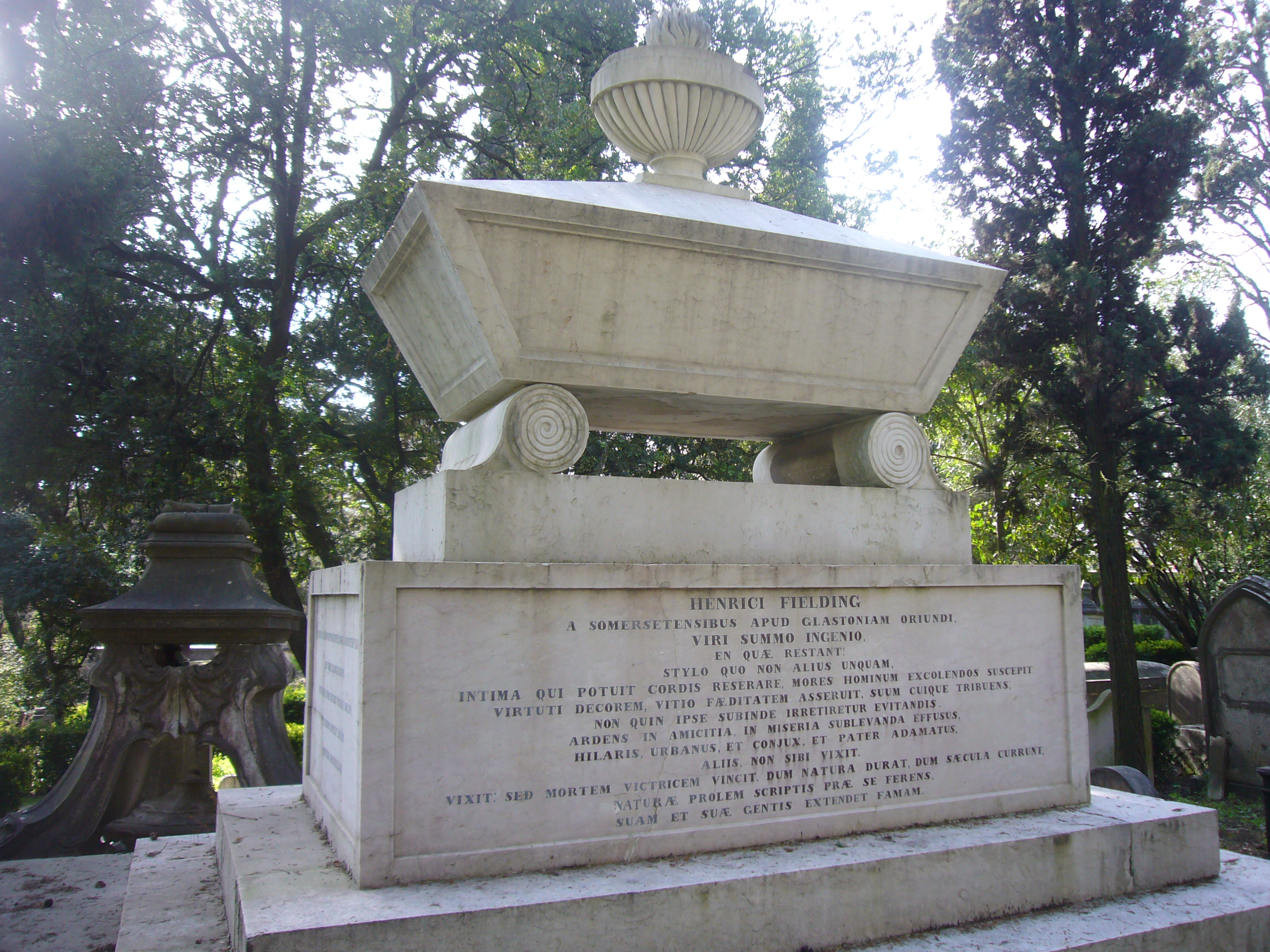
Henry Fielding's grave in the cemetery of the Church of England St. George's Church, Lisbon

In January 1752, Fielding started a fortnightly, The Covent-Garden Journal, published under the pseudonym "Sir Alexander Drawcansir, Knt., Censor of Great Britain" until November of that year. Here Fielding challenged the "armies of Grub Street" and periodical writers of the day in a conflict that became the Paper War of 1752–1753.

Fielding then published Examples of the Interposition of Providence in the Detection and Punishment of Murder (1752), a treatise rejecting deistic and materialistic visions of the world in favour of belief in God's presence and divine judgement, arguing that the murder rate was rising due to neglect of the Christian religion. In 1753 he wrote Proposals for Making an Effectual Provision for the Poor.

== Death ==
Fielding's humanitarian commitment to justice in the 1750s, for instance, in support of Elizabeth Canning, coincided with rapid deterioration in his health. Gout, asthma and cirrhosis of the liver left him on crutches, and with other afflictions sent him to Portugal in 1754 to seek a cure. He died two months later in Lisbon, reportedly in pain and mental distress. His tomb there is in the British Cemetery (Cemitério Inglês), the graveyard of St. George's Church, Lisbon.

== List of works ==
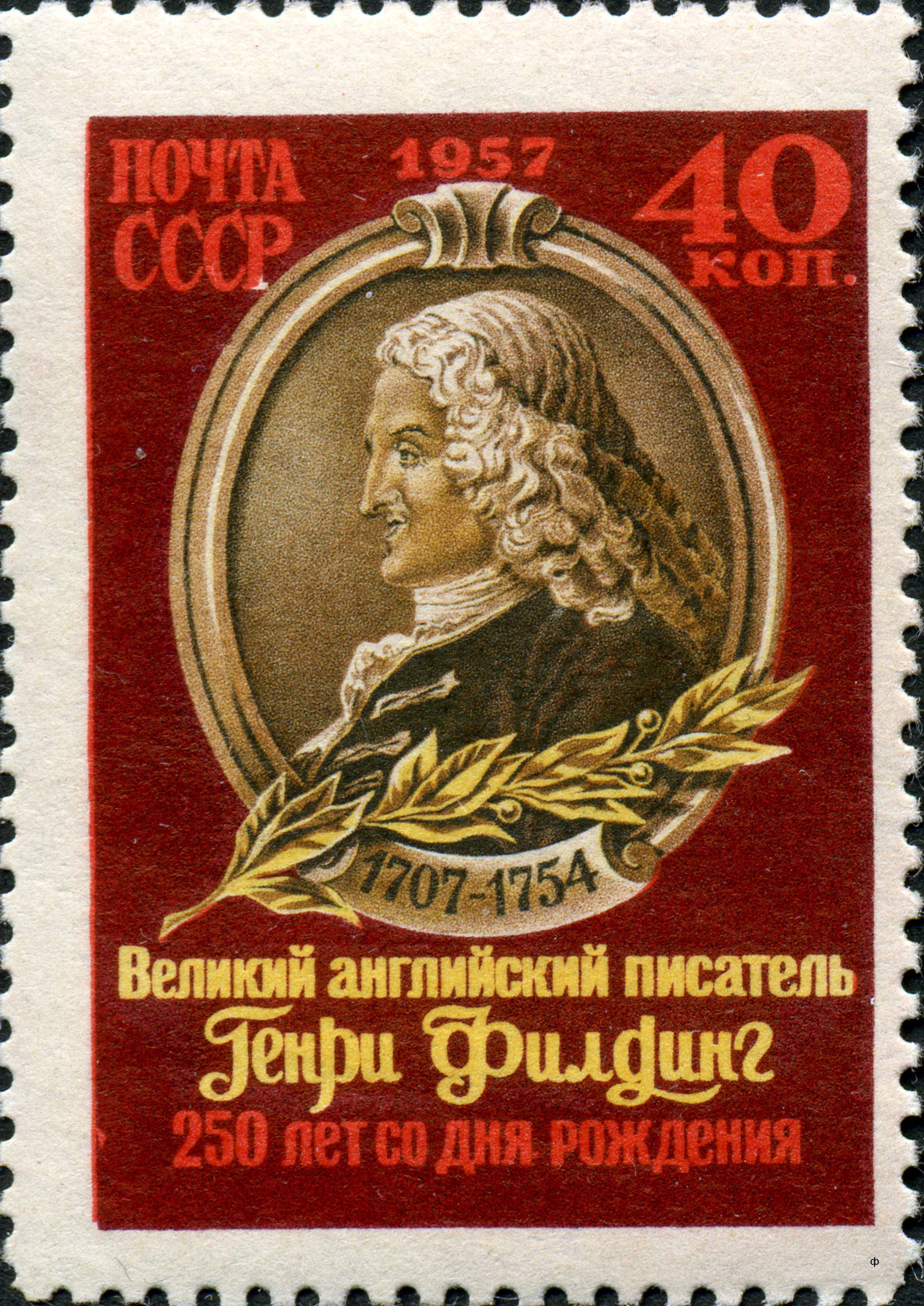
Fielding on a 1957 Soviet stamp

=== Novels ===
- An Apology for the Life of Mrs. Shamela Andrews – novella, 1741
- The History of the Adventures of Joseph Andrews and his Friend, Mr. Abraham Adams – 1742
- The Life and Death of Jonathan Wild, the Great – 1743, ironic treatment of Jonathan Wild, a notorious underworld figure of the time. Published as Volume 3 of Miscellanies
- The Female Husband or the Surprising History of Mrs Mary alias Mr George Hamilton, who was convicted of having married a young woman of Wells and lived with her as her husband, taken from her own mouth since her confinement – pamphlet, fictionalized report, 1746
- The History of Tom Jones, a Foundling – 1749
- A Journey from this World to the Next – 1749
- Amelia – 1751

=== Partial list of poems ===
- The Masquerade – (Fielding's first publication)
- Part of Juvenal's Sixth Satire, Modernized in Burlesque Verse

=== Plays ===
- Love in Several Masques (1728)
- Rape upon Rape; or, The Justice Caught in his own Trap (1730), also known as The Coffee-House Politician, played in rep with Tom Thumb the Great
- Tom Thumb the Great: A Burlesque Tragedy (1730)
- The Temple Beau (1730)
- The Author's Farce; and The Pleasures of the Town (1730)
- The Letter Writers, or A New Way to Keep a Wife at Home: A Farce (1731), originally an afterpiece to The Tragedy of Tragedies
- The Tragedy of Tragedies: or the Life and Death of Tom Thumb the Great (1731), a revision of Tom Thumb the Great
- The Coffee-House Politician, or The Justice Caught in his own Trap, A Comedy (1730–31), a reworking of Rape upon Rape. In 1730, another act was added to the play, titled The Battle of the Poets (author unknown).
- The Old Debauchees (1732), originally titled The Despairing Debauchee. Later revived as The Becauchees; or, The Jesuit Caught
- The Covent-Garden Tragedy (1732), originally appeared in rep with The Old Debauchees, but only played one night. Eventually revived in rep with Don Quixote in England
- The Mock Doctor: or The Dumb Lady Cur'd (1732), adapted from Molière's Le Médecin malgré lui, played in rep with The Old Debauchees, as a replacement for The Covent-Garden Tragedy
- The Welsh Opera (1731), originally a companion piece to The Tragedy of Tragedies
- The Grub Street Opera (1731), Fieldings only closet drama, expanded from his play The Welsh Opera
- The Modern Husband (1732)
- The Lottery (1732), played in rep with Joseph Addison's Cato. A ballad opera with music from "Mr. Seedo."
- The Intriguing Chambermaid (1734), after Jean-François Regnard
- An Old Man Taught Wisdom, or The Virgin Unmasked, A Farce (1734), ballad opera
- Don Quixote in England (1734), ballad opera
- The Miser (1735), incidental music by Thomas Arne, based on the Molière and Plautus
- The Universal Gallant, or The Different Husbands (1735)
- Pasquin (1736)
- Eurydice, A Farce (1737)
- Eurydice Hiss'd, or A Word to the Wise (1737)
- The Historical Register for the Year 1736 – 1737
- Miss Lucy in Town, ballad farce librettist (1742), composer Thomas Arne, revived in 1770 as The Country Madcap
- Tumbledown Dick or Phaeton in the Suds (1744), ballad opera
- The Wedding-Day. A Comedy. (1743)
- The Fathers (1778), published posthumously with Oliver Goldsmith's The Good-Natur'd Man

Further Adaptations

- The Opera of Operas; Or, Tom Thumb the Great Alter’d from the Life and Death of Tom Thumb the Great and Set to Musick after the Italian Manner. As It Is Performing at the New Theatre in the Hay-Market, (1733) written by Eliza Haywood and William Hatchett, music by Thomas Arne, adapted from the Fielding
- Tom Thumb the Great: A Burlesque Tragedy from Fielding (1805–1810), written by Kane O’Hara Esq., adapted from Fielding
- Squire Badger: A burletta in two acts, Thomas Arne composer and librettist (1772), after Henry Fielding's Don Quixote in England (1729). The work was revived under the name The Sot in 1775.
- The Rival Queens (1794), adapted by William Holcroft from Fielding's The Covent-Garden Tragedy
- Lock Up Your Daughters (1959), musical based on Rape Upon Rape, book by Bernard Miles, lyrics by Lionel Bart, music by Laurie Johnson. Made into a non-musical film (1969).

=== Miscellaneous writings ===
- translator of ‘’The military history of Charles XII, King of Sweden, written by the express order of his Majesty, by M. Gustaf Adlerfelt Gustavus Adlerfeld, Chamberlain to the King. To which is added, an exact account of the Battle of Pultowa, with a Journal of the King's Retreat to Bender. Illustrated with plans of the Battles and Sieges.’’ (London, 1740).
- Miscellanies – collection of works, 1743, contained the poem "Part of Juvenal's Sixth Satire, Modernized in Burlesque Verse"
- "Examples of the interposition of Providence in the Detection and Punishment of Murder containing above thirty cases in which this dreadful crime has been brought to light in the most extraordinary and miraculous manner; collected from various authors, ancient and modern" (1752)
- The Covent-Garden Journal – periodical, 1752
- The Journal of a Voyage to Lisbon – travel narrative, 1755
