= Pregnancy in art =

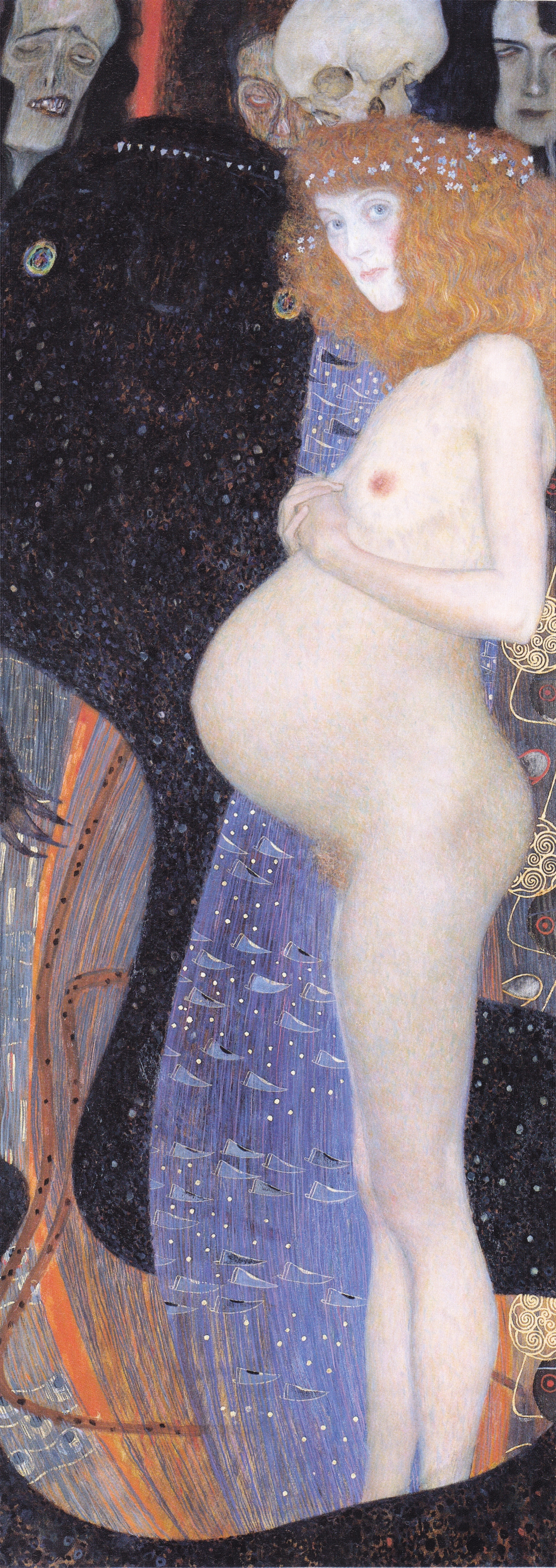
Gustav Klimt, 1903, Hoffnung I (Hope I)

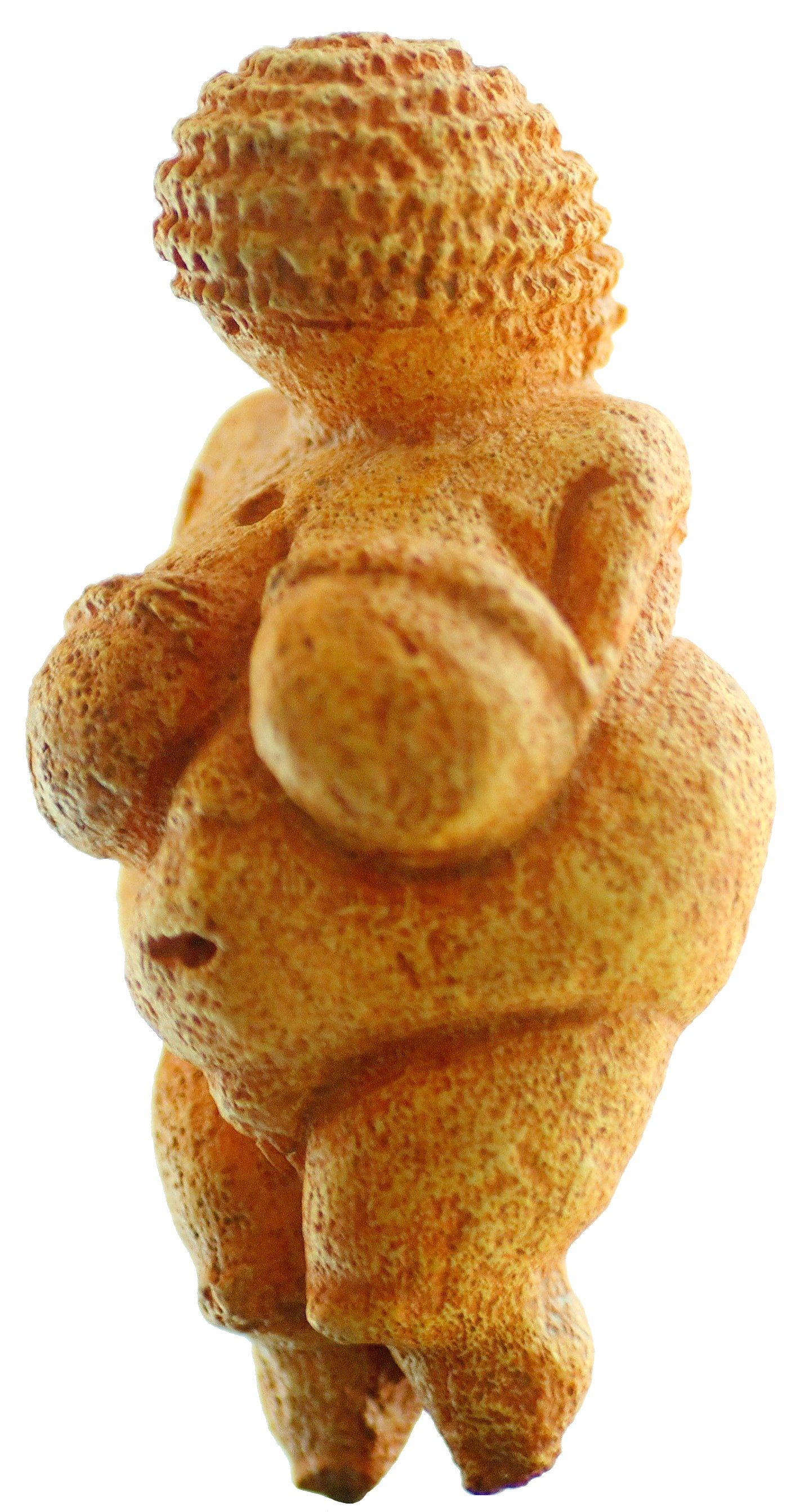
Venus of Willendorf, c. 25,000 BC, Austria

Pregnancy in art covers any artistic work that portrays pregnancy. In art, as in life, it is often unclear whether an actual state of pregnancy is intended to be shown. A common visual indication is the gesture of the woman placing a protective open hand on her abdomen. Historically, married women were at some stage of pregnancy for much of their life until menopause, but the depiction of this in art is relatively uncommon, and generally restricted to some specific contexts. This probably persists even in contemporary culture; despite several recent artworks depicting heavily pregnant women, one writer was "astonished at the shortage of visual images ... of pregnant women in public visual culture". A research study conducted by Pierre Bourdieu in 1963 found that the great majority of 693 French subjects thought that a photo of a pregnant woman could not, by definition, be beautiful.

There are two subjects often depicted in Western narrative art, or history painting, where pregnancy is an important part of the story. These are the unhappy scene usually called Diana and Callisto, showing the moment of discovery of Callisto's forbidden pregnancy, and the biblical scene of the Visitation. Gradually, portraits of pregnant women began to appear, with a particular fashion for "pregnancy portraits" in elite portraiture of the years around 1600.

As well as being a subject for depiction in art, pregnant women were also consumers of art, with some special types of work developed for them, including Madonna del Parto images of Mary.

== Traditional and ancient cultures ==
Images of pregnant women, especially small figurines, were made in traditional cultures in many places and periods, though it is rarely one of the most common types of image. These include ceramic figures from some Pre-Columbian cultures, and a few figures from most of the ancient Mediterranean cultures. Many of these seem to be connected with fertility. Identifying whether such figures are actually meant to show pregnancy is often a problem, as well as understanding their role in the culture concerned.

Among the oldest surviving examples of the depiction of pregnancy are prehistoric figurines found across much of Eurasia and collectively known as Venus figurines. The best known is the Venus of Willendorf, an oolitic limestone figurine of a woman whose breasts and hips have been exaggerated to emphasise her fertility. These figurines exaggerate the abdomen, hips, breasts, thighs, or vulva of the subject, but the degree to which the figures appear to be pregnant varies considerably, and most are not noticeably pregnant at all. An inevitably subjective survey of the corpus of about 140 figurines concluded that only 17% of them represented pregnant women, extending to 39% "which could possibly represent pregnancy".

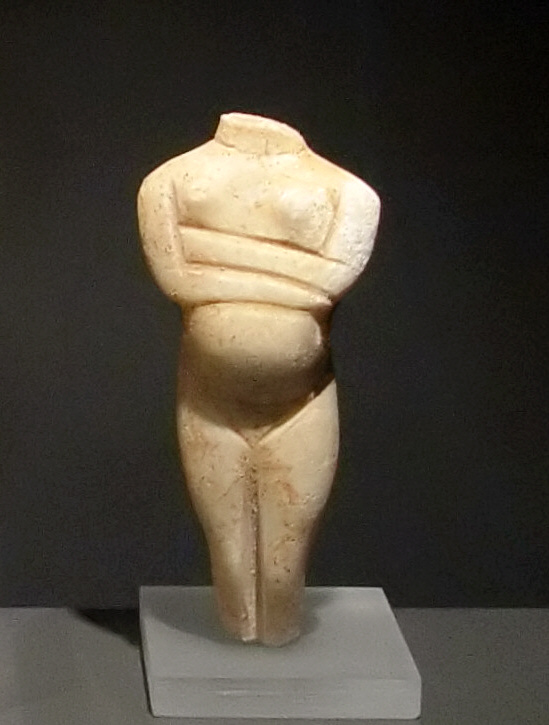
Cycladic figure, Early Bronze Age

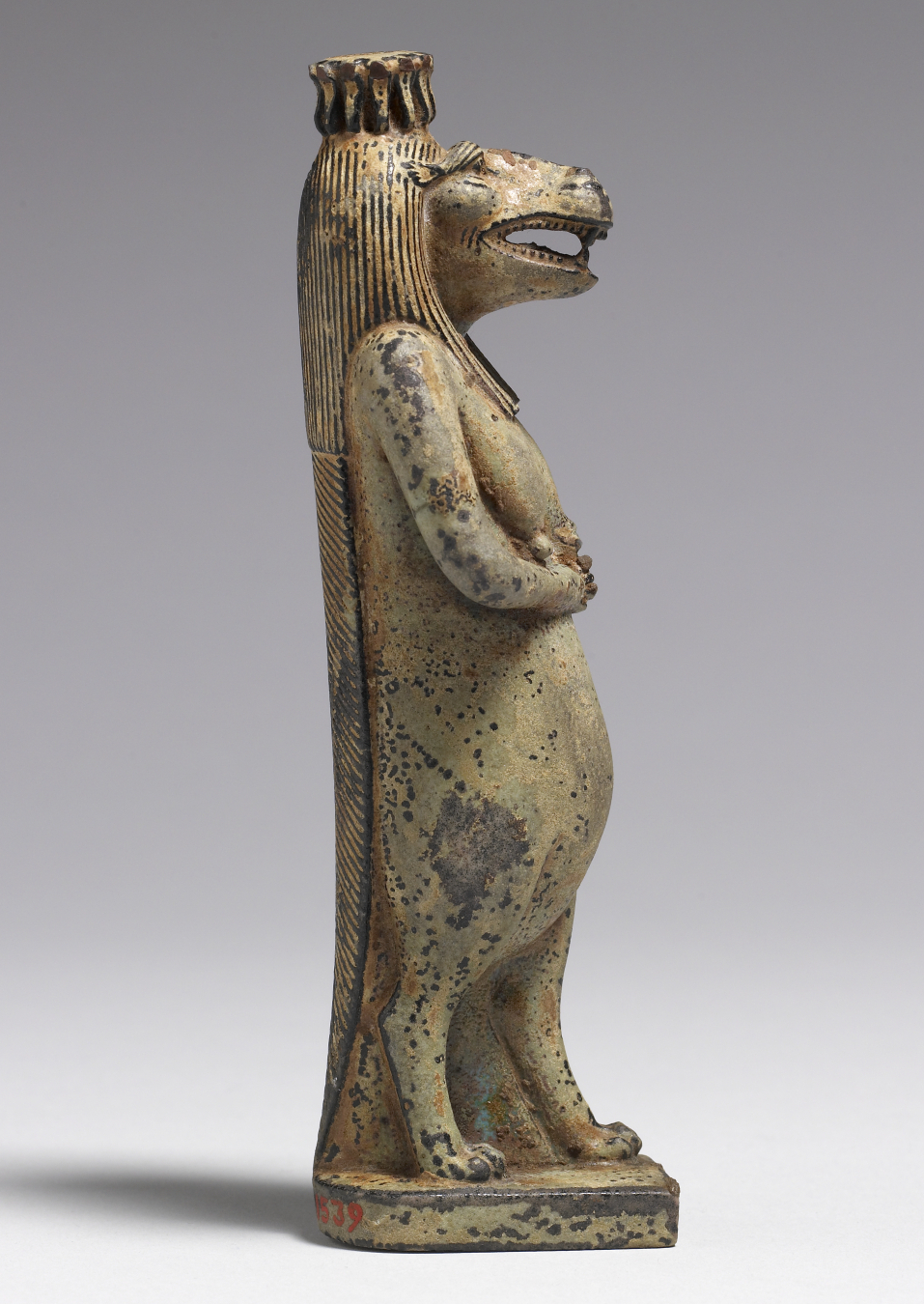
Taweret ancient Egyptian goddess of pregnancy.

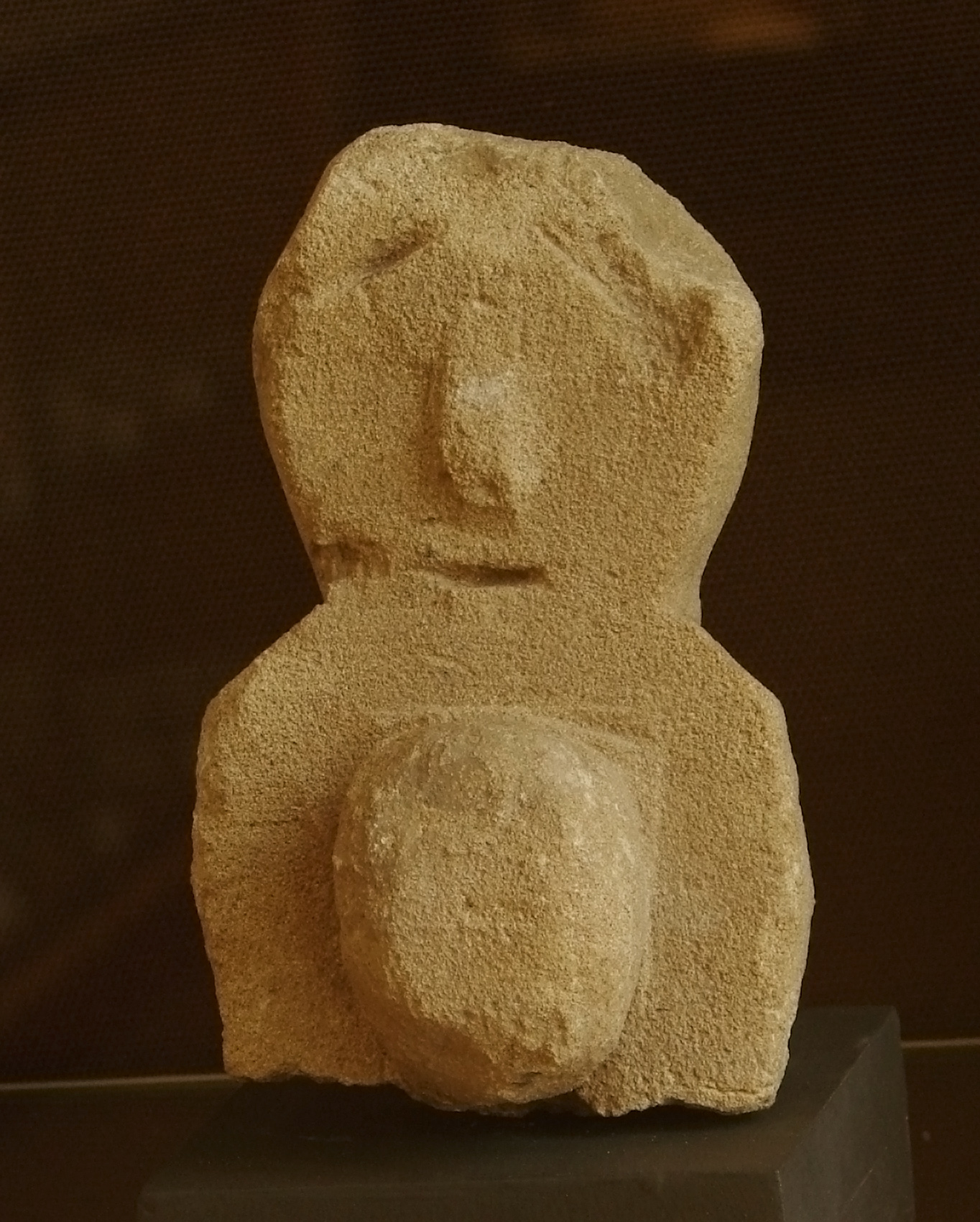
Gallo-Roman votive figure, 1st century

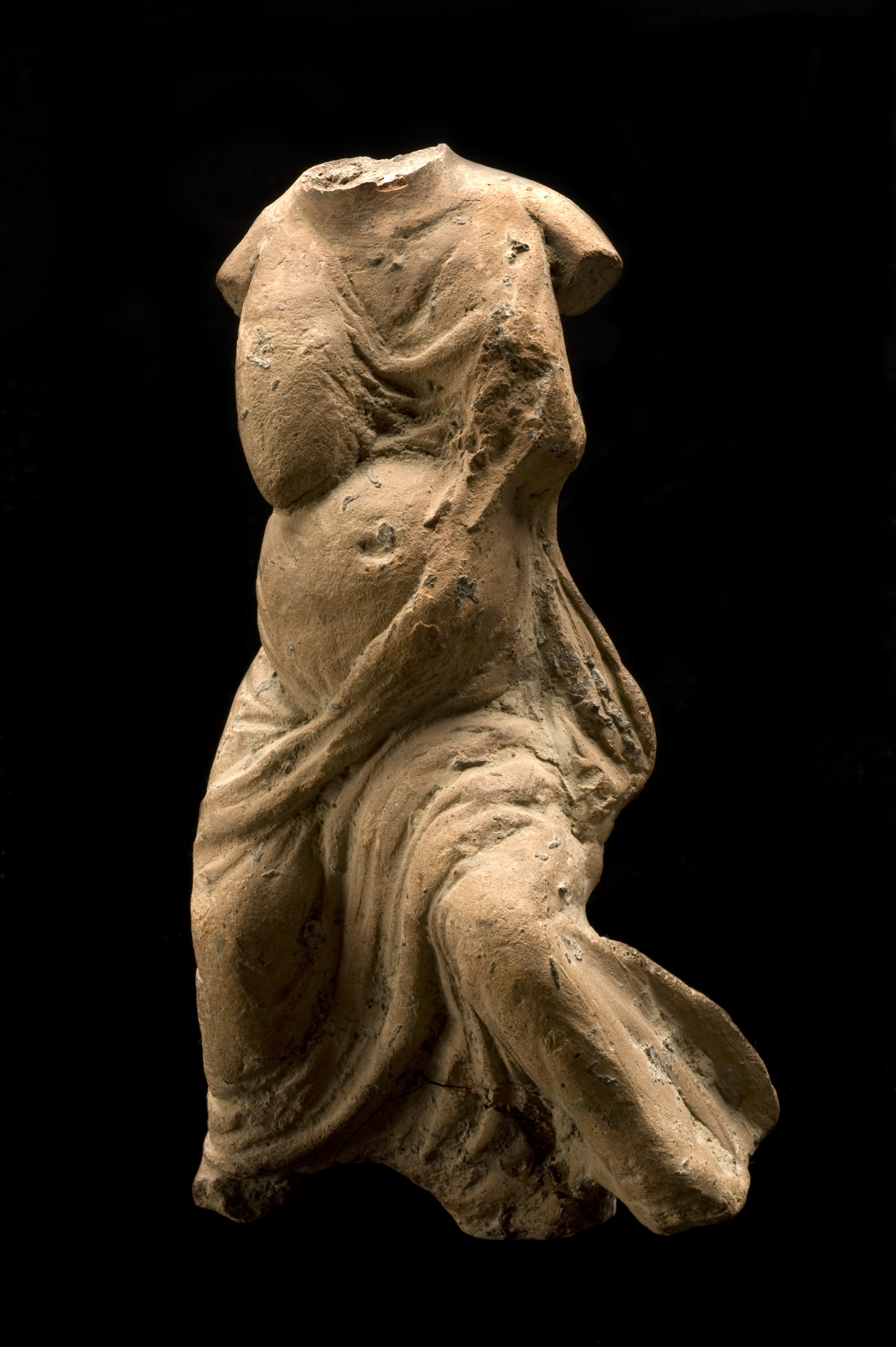
Damaged Roman votive, date uncertain

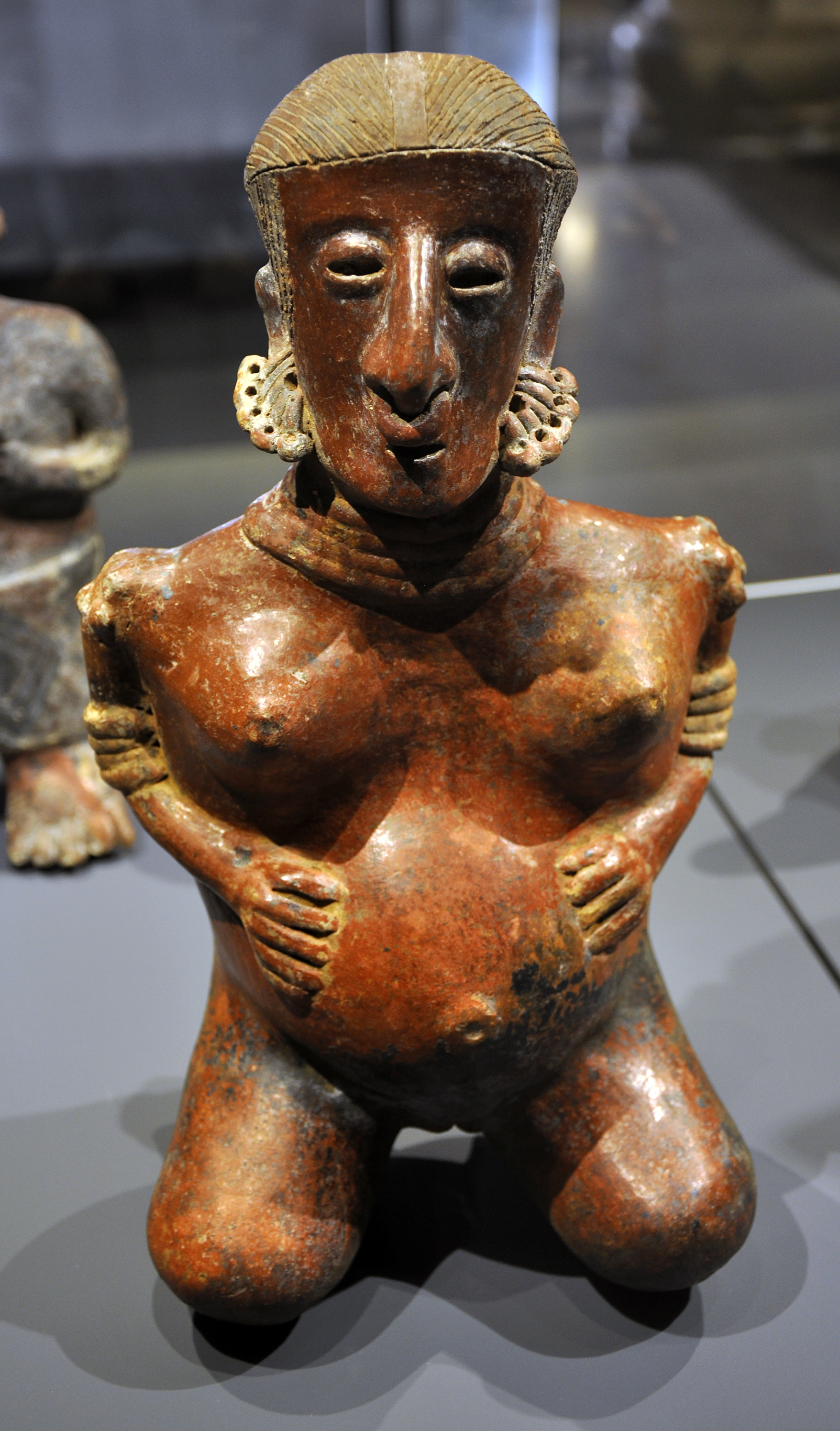
Pottery figure from ancient Mexico

== Western art ==
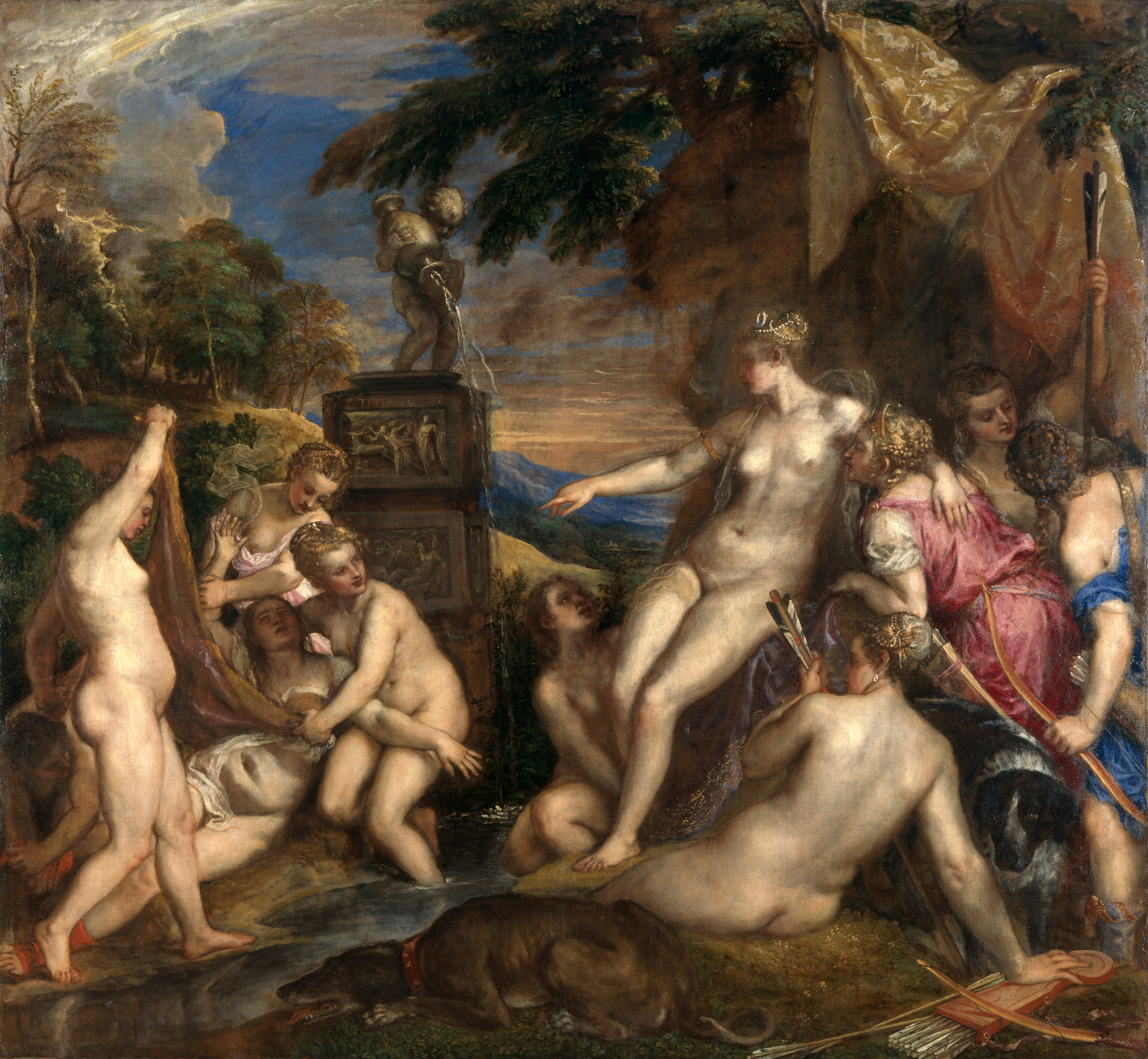
Titian's Diana and Callisto, 1559, shows the moment when Callisto's pregnancy is discovered.

In Europe, depictions of pregnancy were largely avoided in classical art (apart from small votive figures), but later Western art had two subjects that were frequently depicted where pregnancy was integral to the narrative.

=== Callisto ===
In Greek mythology the nymph Callisto became pregnant by Zeus (Jupiter to the Romans) in disguise. Her pregnancy was spotted when she was bathing, and her furious mistress Artemis (Diana) sent her away; Jupiter's wife Juno then turned her into a bear. The few classical depictions tended to show this transformation, but in later art the traumatic moment of discovery was most often depicted, especially from the Renaissance onwards, using the Roman poet Ovid as the source.

What became the typical composition was first seen in Titian's Diana and Callisto (1559), where Callisto's abdomen is exposed as Artemis/Diana points accusingly at her and her other followers display a variety of reactions. Although Ovid places the discovery in the ninth month of Callisto's pregnancy (Metamorphoses II, 441–465), in paintings she is generally shown with a rather modest bump for late pregnancy. But this is appropriate as the scene shows the moment when her intimate companions first realized that she was pregnant. It is clear that the main attraction of the subject was the opportunity to depict a group of female nudes, though it could be claimed that it illustrated the serious consequences of an unwanted pregnancy.

=== Virgin Mary ===
Depictions of Mary were by far the most frequent images featuring a pregnant woman in post-classical Western art, and probably remain so to the modern day. The moment of Mary's conception of Jesus, called the Annunciation, is one of the most common subjects in traditional Christian art, but depictions from later in her pregnancy are also common. Unlike many other kinds of depictions of pregnancy, there is usually no ambiguity as to whether Mary is intended to be shown while pregnant, even where the pregnancy is not clearly visualized.

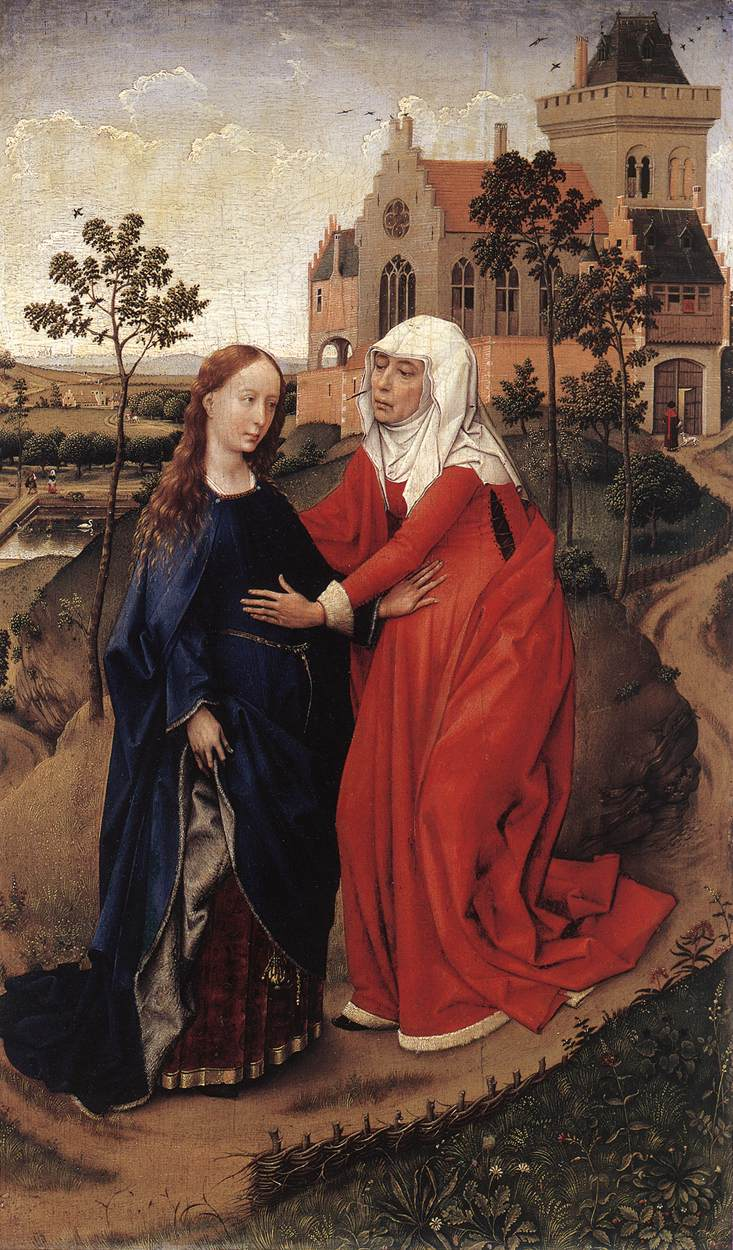
Visitation by Rogier van der Weyden (1430s, now Leipzig) with open laces on Elizabeth

The Visitation, a meeting between two pregnant women, Mary and Elizabeth, as recorded in the Gospel of Luke Luke 1:39–56, was very often depicted, but their pregnancy is usually not emphasized visually, at least until Early Netherlandish painting of the 15th century. Medieval thinking held that Elizabeth was about seven months pregnant at the meeting, and Mary about one.

The loose full clothes used in religious art, as in normal medieval life, make it hard to detect in any case. In late medieval paintings they may be shown with vertical gaps in their clothes; female medieval dress had openings that were normally closed by laces when dressing, but could be left open during pregnancy. These may be either at the front or the sides, and are used in art to indicate pregnancy, although from about 1450 such gaps, revealing a contrasting colour of undergarment, became a fashion and can be seen in art on slim, unmarried women.

In some cases one or the other places a hand on the bump of the other, as in Rogier van der Weyden's Leipzig version (illustrated). A few images, mostly Byzantine or Late Medieval German, show their unborn children in the womb, as though in a modern cutaway drawing. In German images they are naked (though usually with halos) and John the Baptist bows or kneels to Jesus, who raises a hand in blessing. It should be emphasized that in all periods the majority of depictions have little visual indication that either woman is pregnant; the story was well known to its audience.

Some other images showed the pregnant Virgin with Saint Joseph or other relatives, including some of the Journey to Bethlehem for the birth. This last was a standard part of Byzantine cycles, but rare in the Western church. There are a few images of Joseph and Mary looking for shelter or being turned away at the inn in Bethlehem, mostly from north of the Alps after 1500; in these Mary is usually clearly pregnant.

The rare subject of the Doubting of Joseph also needed to establish Mary's pregnancy, and some versions indicated this by unlaced openings in her dress or a "cutaway" unborn Jesus. In this scene, based on Matthew 1:18–25 and apocryphal elaborations, Joseph is unsettled by the pregnancy of his virgin bride, but is later reassured by an angel who comes to him in a dream, the first of his four dreams in Matthew. Mary is often shown spinning while pregnant; the spinning figure with "cutaway" illustrated has Joseph's head appearing through the tracery at left.

In a similar painting in Budapest, where Mary spun while Joseph slept and the angel appeared to him, the unborn Jesus is not visible in the painting now, but can be seen in the underdrawing with infrared reflectography. Either the artist or patron had a change of mind at the time, or it was overpainted later, perhaps as the motif came to be felt indecorous or primitive. Other similar images are of Mary alone, especially as statues; these are called Maria gravida ("Pregnant Mary") and are covered below.

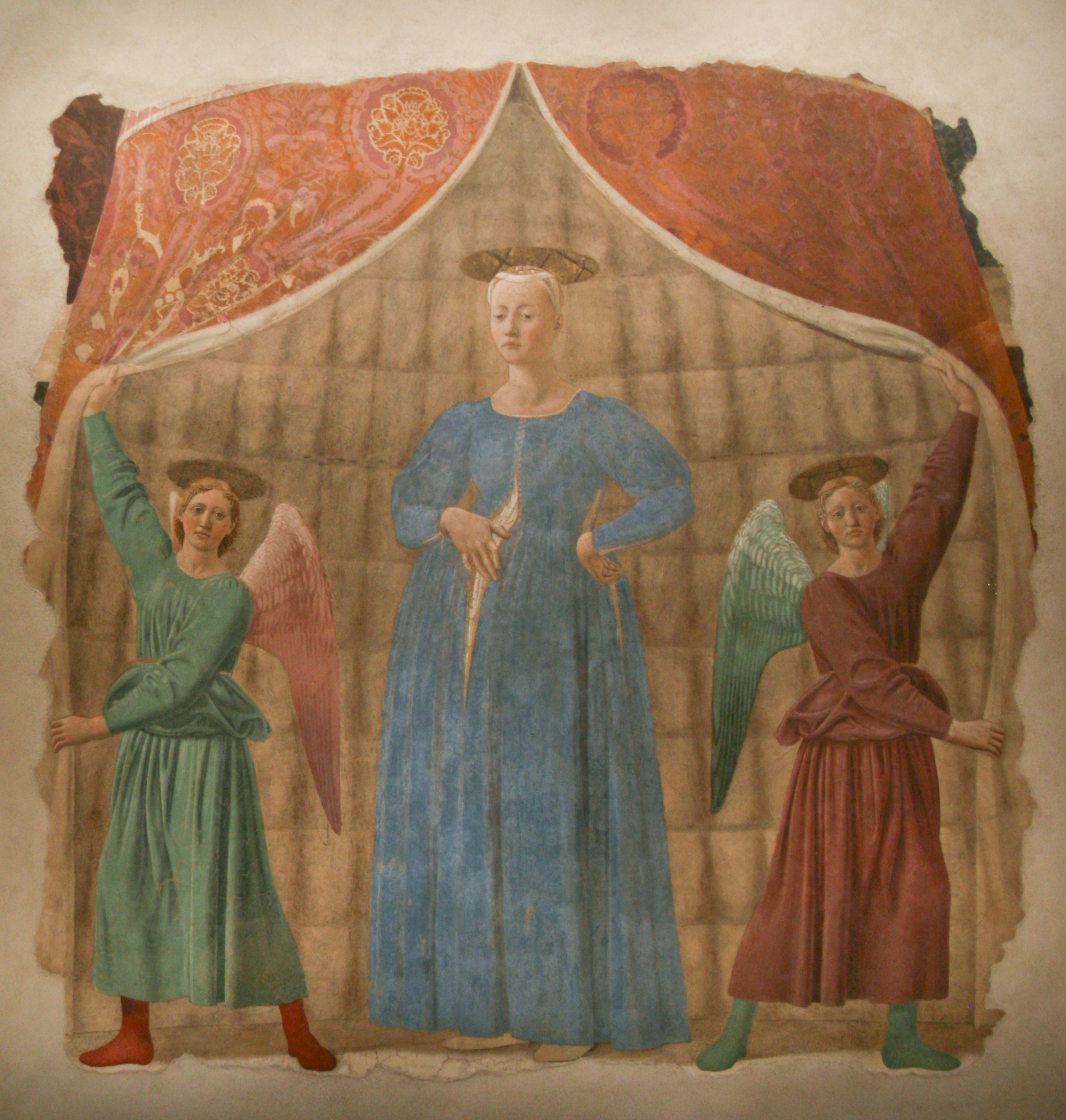
Madonna del Parto by Piero della Francesca, c. 1460, with unlacing at the front and side

A number of Early Netherlandish paintings show Mary Magdalene with the same unlaced opening in her dress. Penny Howell Jolly has proposed that this motif represents her "spiritual pregnancy", although in his account of the most famous example, The Descent from the Cross by van der Weyden (c. 1435, now Prado) Lorne Campbell notes the unlacing, but attributes it merely to Mary Magdalene's distressed condition.

Madonna del Parto is a term for figures of the Virgin Mary especially associated with pregnancy and childbirth, or showing the Virgin pregnant. These are not very common; the best known is the fresco by Piero della Francesca, where a heavily pregnant Mary has a prominent unlaced opening at the front of her dress, and another at the side. However, these depictions fell from fashion during the Renaissance, and the Piero is the latest known from Tuscany. These attracted the devotions of pregnant women or those concerned for them, as well as those wanting a pregnancy. Queen Claude of France, who had seven children before dying at the age of 24, had the painting of the Visitation by Sebastiano del Piombo (now Louvre) in her chamber.

A few of these images of Mary feature a "cutaway" view of Jesus in utero within, as found in some images of the Visitation (see above), and many have the same protective gesture of the hand on the stomach, which also features in portraits of pregnant women when these begin to appear. After the Counter-Reformation a visualized in utero Jesus becomes rare, and instead Mary may be shown with the Christogram "IHS" on her stomach.

In Eastern Orthodox icons, the in utero Jesus, which is normally fully clothed, remains part of the tradition for certain representations to the present day. It is found in one of the most famous Russian icons, the 12th-century Ustyug Annunciation in the Tretyakov Gallery, Moscow, which has the birth-size Child shown inside the chest area, and in the icons of Mary of the type known as Pomozhenie rodam in Russian, translated as "Help in childbirth" (or "Succour in travail").

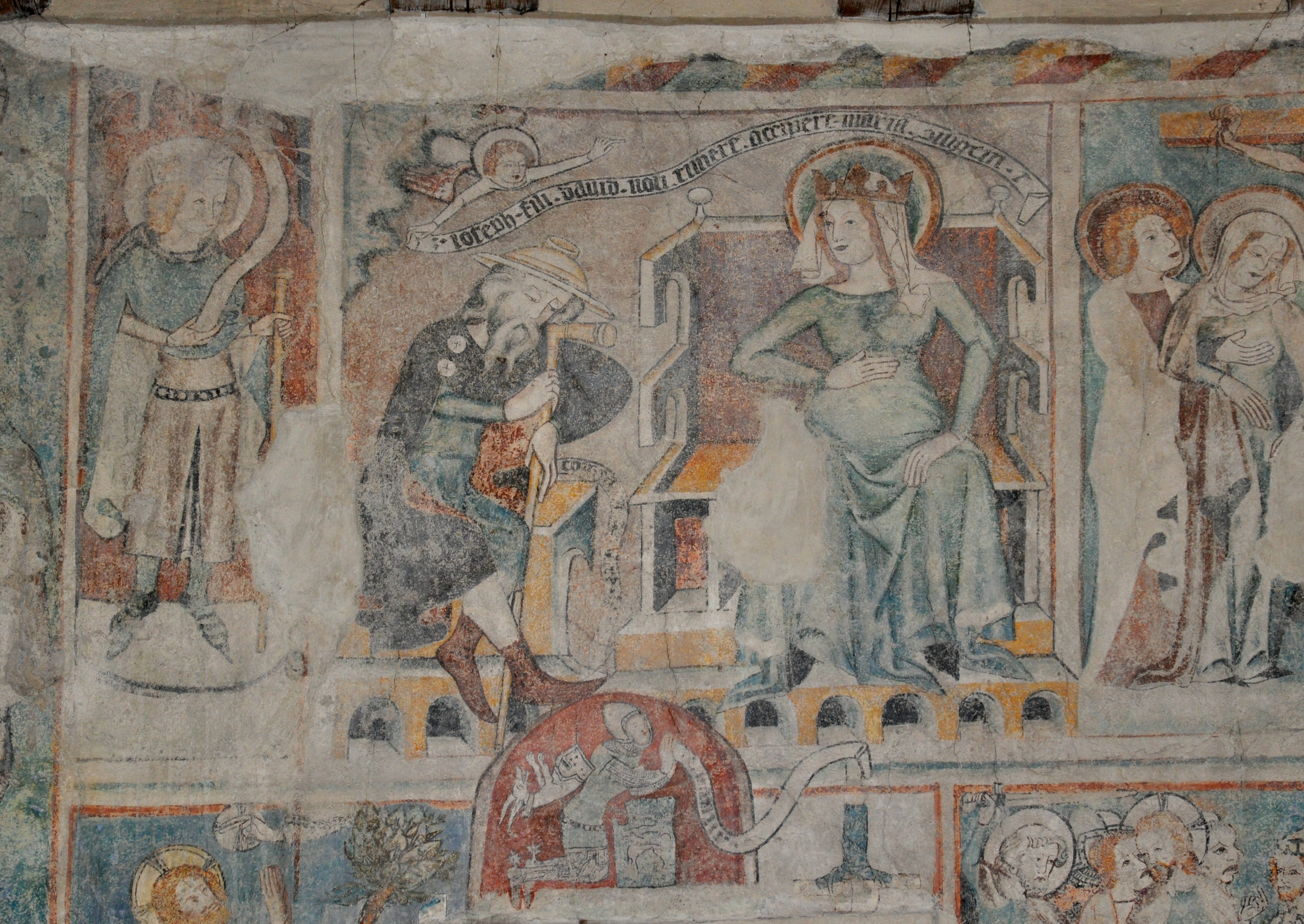
Fresco Doubting of Joseph, 1360. An angel appears to the sleeping Joseph, next to an enthroned Mary.

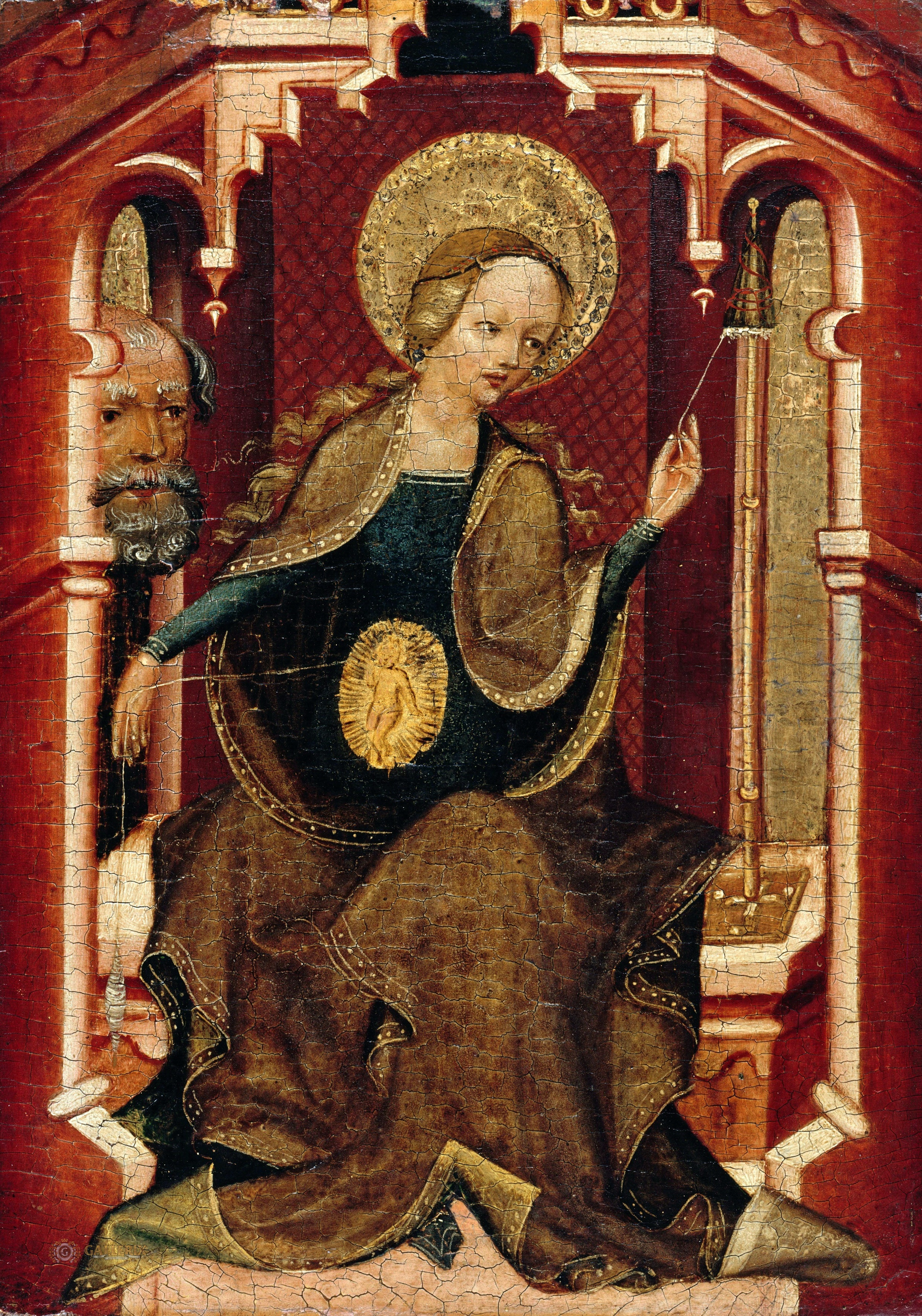
German Doubting of Joseph, c. 1400, with Mary spinning and "cutaway" unborn Jesus

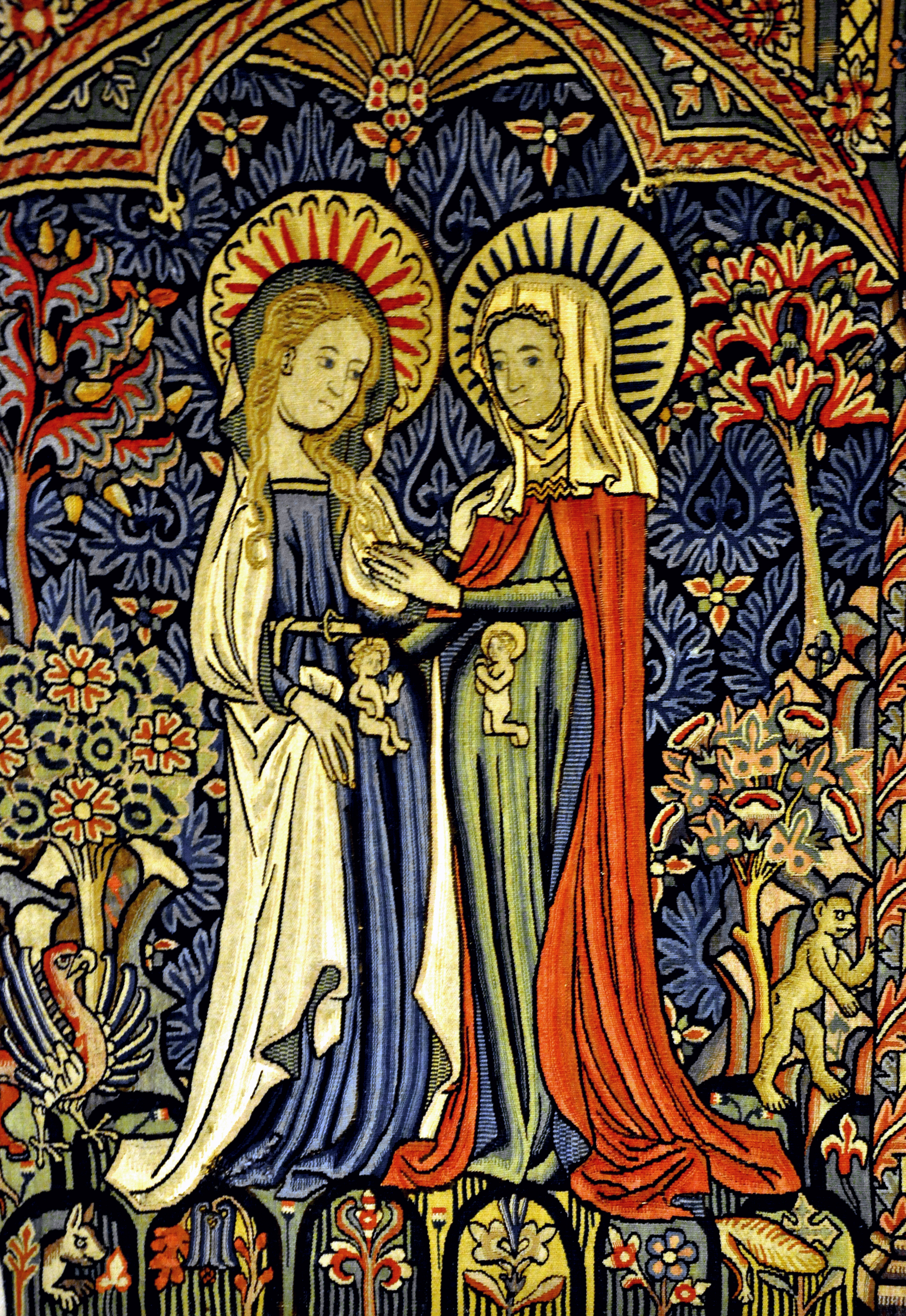
Tapestry Visitation, with the two "cutaway" children, c. 1410. John the Baptist kneels to Jesus, who blesses him.

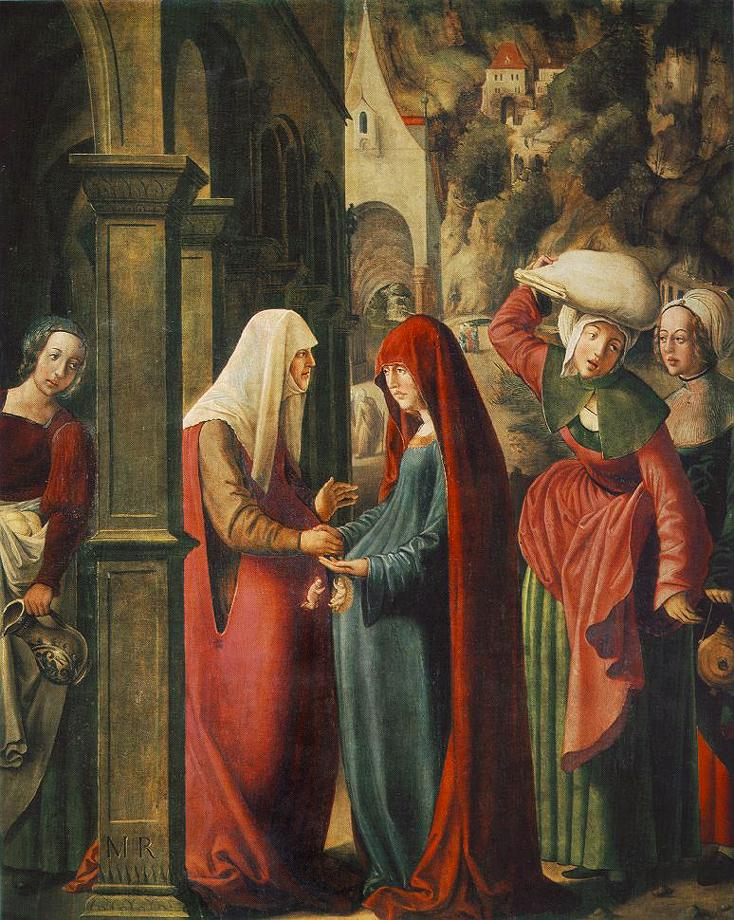
Early 16th-century Austrian Visitation where the pregnancies are unusually clear, even without the in utero figures

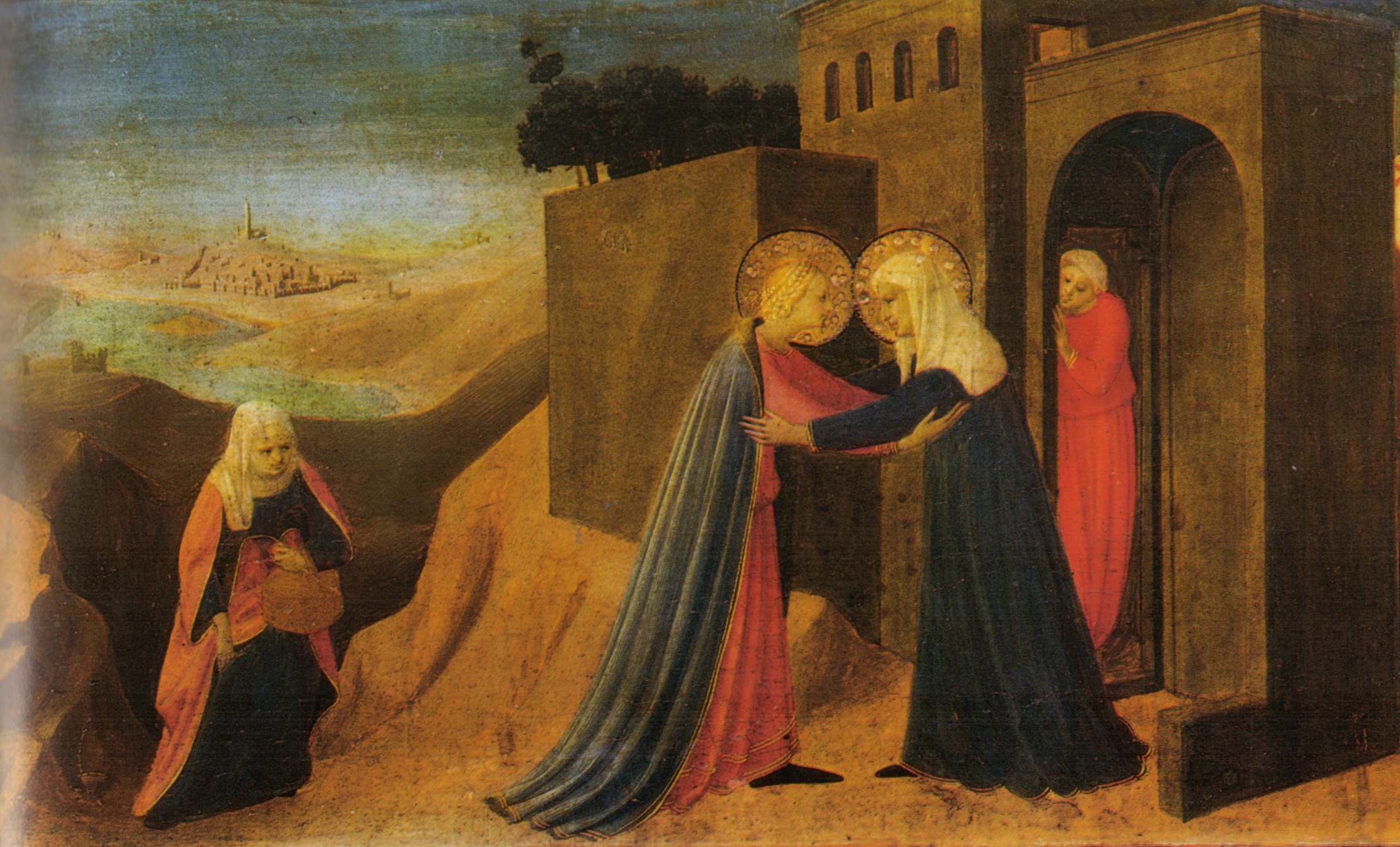
Fra Angelico, a more typical Visitation without much visual indication of the pregnancies

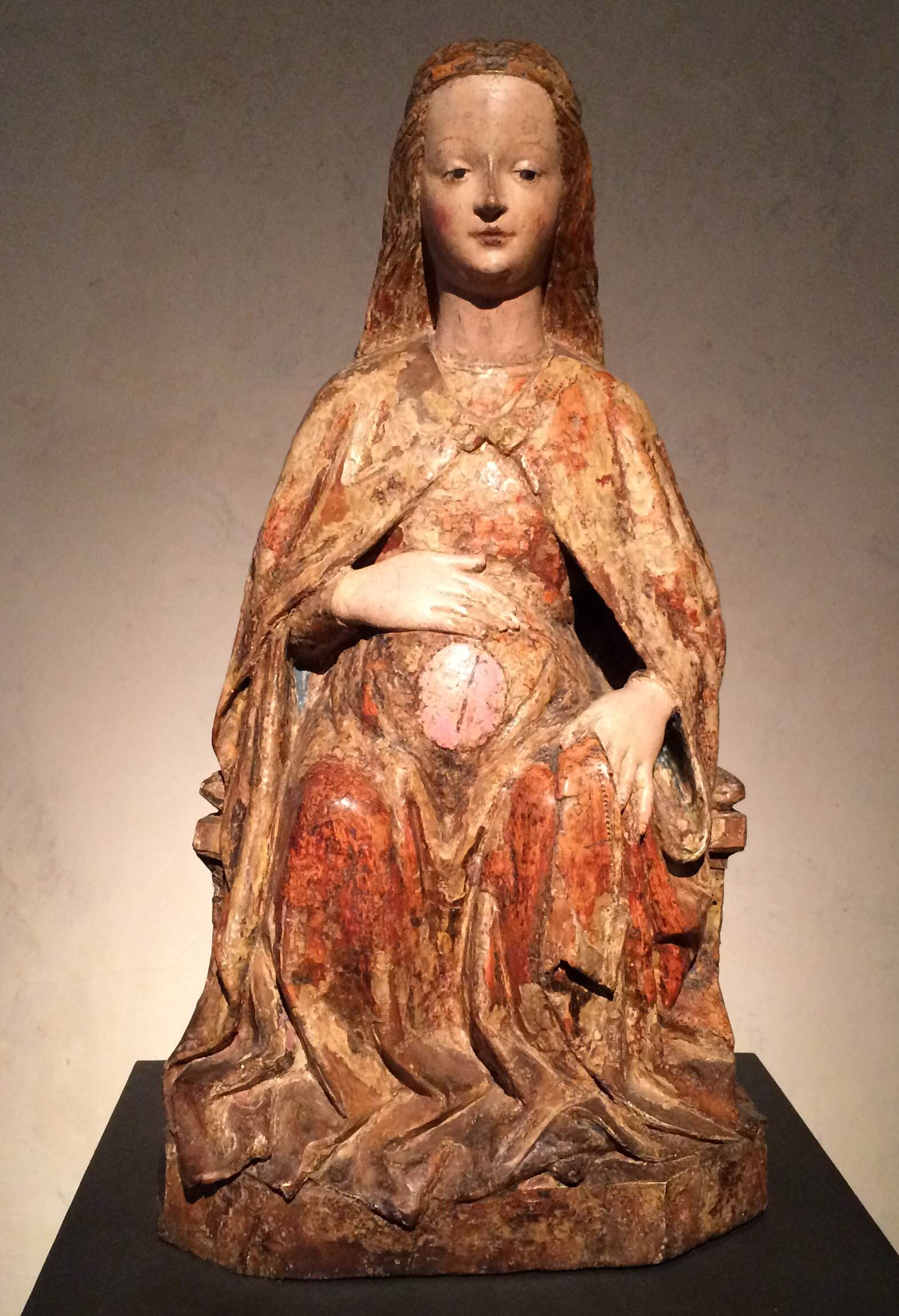
Maria Gravida, International Gothic, perhaps originally with in utero Jesus

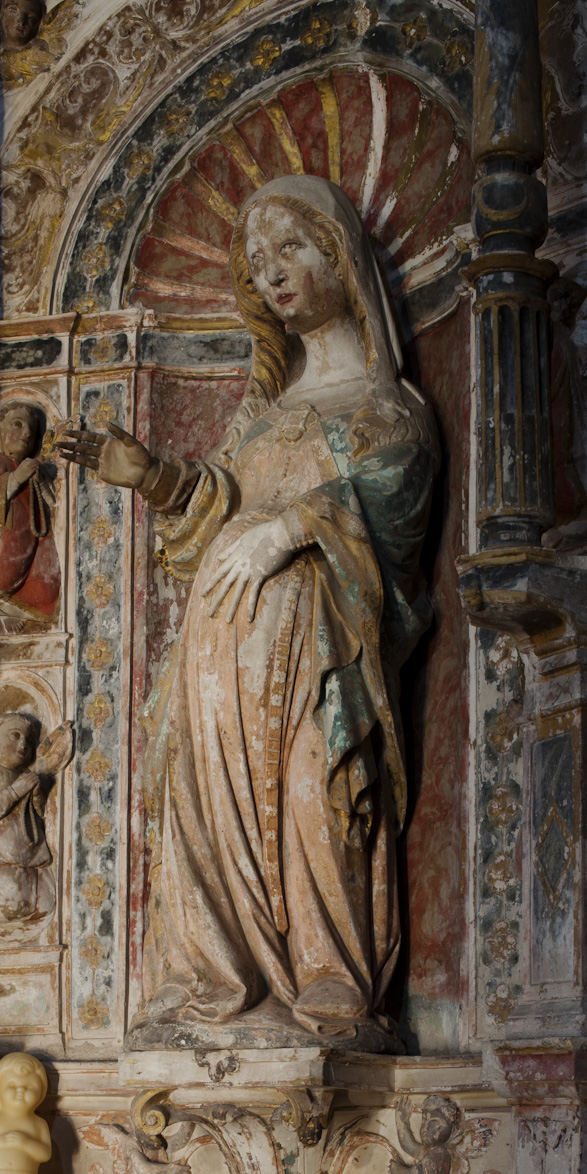
One of several Portuguese Maria Gravida figures, with the protective hand on the stomach

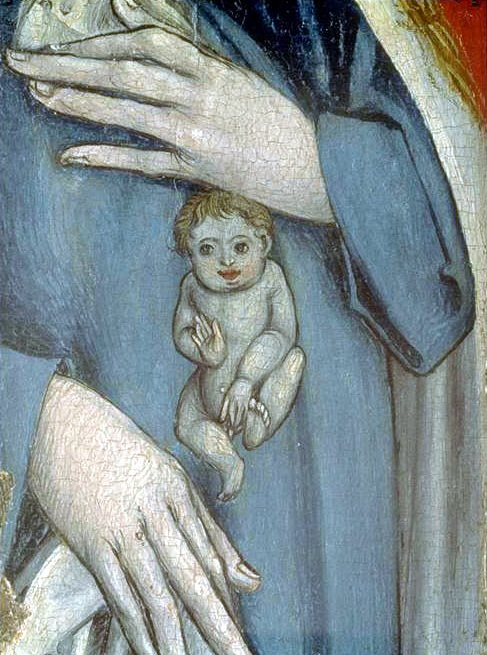
"Cutaway" unborn Jesus, from a Swiss altarpiece of 1505

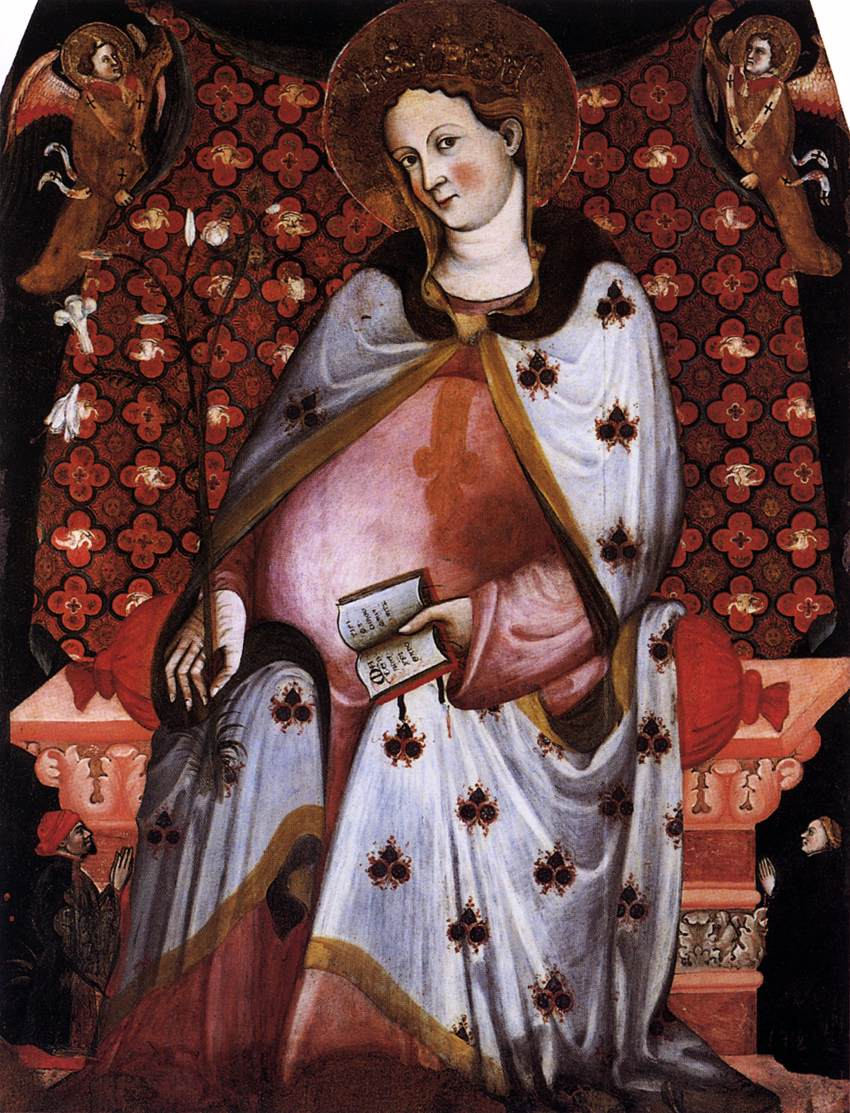
Unusually large Madonna del Parto, 15th century, Italy

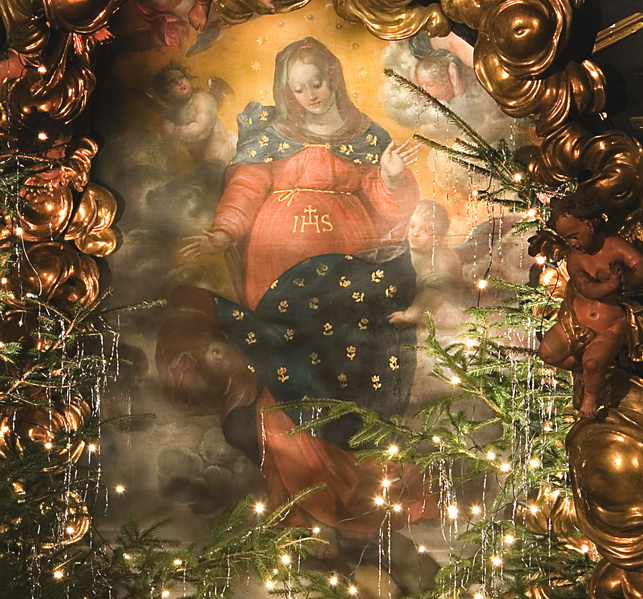
Baroque Maria gravida with the Christogram "IHS" on her stomach

=== Portraits ===
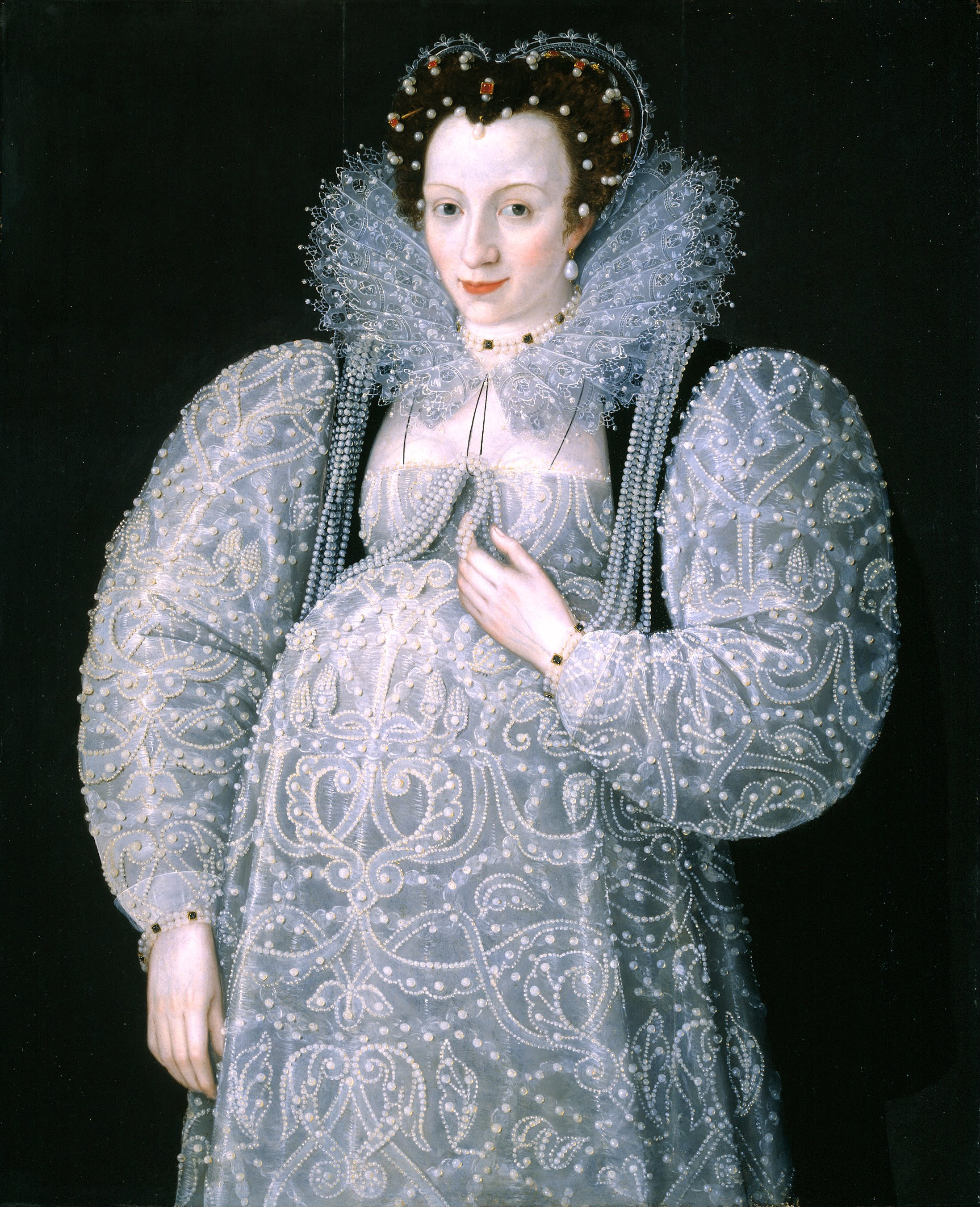
English "pregnancy portrait" of an unknown lady, attributed to Marcus Gheeraerts II, c. 1595

In the Late Medieval Period, portraits of pregnant-looking women began to be painted, though the fashion for dresses gathered at the front makes these difficult to interpret or identify with confidence. The Arnolfini Portrait by Jan van Eyck of 1434 might be an example of pregnancy, but the current views of art historians are mostly against this, as virgin saints were often shown in much the same way. The virgin martyr and "princess" Saint Catherine of Alexandria, usually dressed in the height of fashion in this period, was also the patron saint of childbirth, so there may be a degree of deliberate ambiguity in images of her.

Some Italian Renaissance portraits thought to be of pregnant women show them wearing a gauzy underdress called a guarnello, often associated with pregnancy or the period after childbirth. These include Leonardo da Vinci's Mona Lisa, where the garment first became visible under infra-red scans in 2006, suggesting that Lisa del Giocondo, the sitter, was pregnant or just had a baby when she was painted. Another painting with a guarnello is Botticelli's Portrait of a Lady Known as Smeralda Brandini, where the sitter also holds a hand over the top of her bump. This is a feature seen in many images such as Visitation scenes where pregnancy is certain, and that probably indicates it in cases where it is much less clear, including some portraits by Anthony van Dyck. La Donna Gravida ("The Pregnant Lady") by Raphael is another example, with an apparently pregnant woman sitting with her left hand over her stomach, but such depictions remained infrequent in Renaissance art.

An exception to this is the "pregnancy portrait" (a term first used by Karen Hearn, a Tate Britain curator) of a woman shown as heavily pregnant, usually standing. These are especially found in England, where the fashion may have been popularized in about the 1590s by Marcus Gheeraerts the Younger, an English painter of Flemish parentage, who was the leading English painter of these portraits. Part of the reason for them may have been the risk to the mother of childbirth and some may well be posthumous.

There are some earlier examples from court portraiture on the Continent, and in England, but the main group of English portraits dates from roughly the late 1580s to about 1630. At around the same time as the English examples Margaret of Austria, Queen of Spain sent portraits of herself while pregnant to close female friends and relations. The example illustrated below by her court painter Bartolomé González y Serrano, which was sent back home to the Austrian Habsburgs, only varies her standard official portrait by exchanging her daughter for the usual dog or chair at the left, and bringing out her dress at the front. Probably no fresh posing for the artist was necessary. Her daughter, Anne of Austria, Queen of France, was herself painted when 8 months pregnant with the future Louis XIV, born 23 years into her marriage. The portrait of their unfortunate cousin, Holy Roman Empress Maria Leopoldine of Austria, who died in childbirth at 16 in 1649, the year the portrait is dated, is perhaps a posthumous adaptation of her wedding portrait.

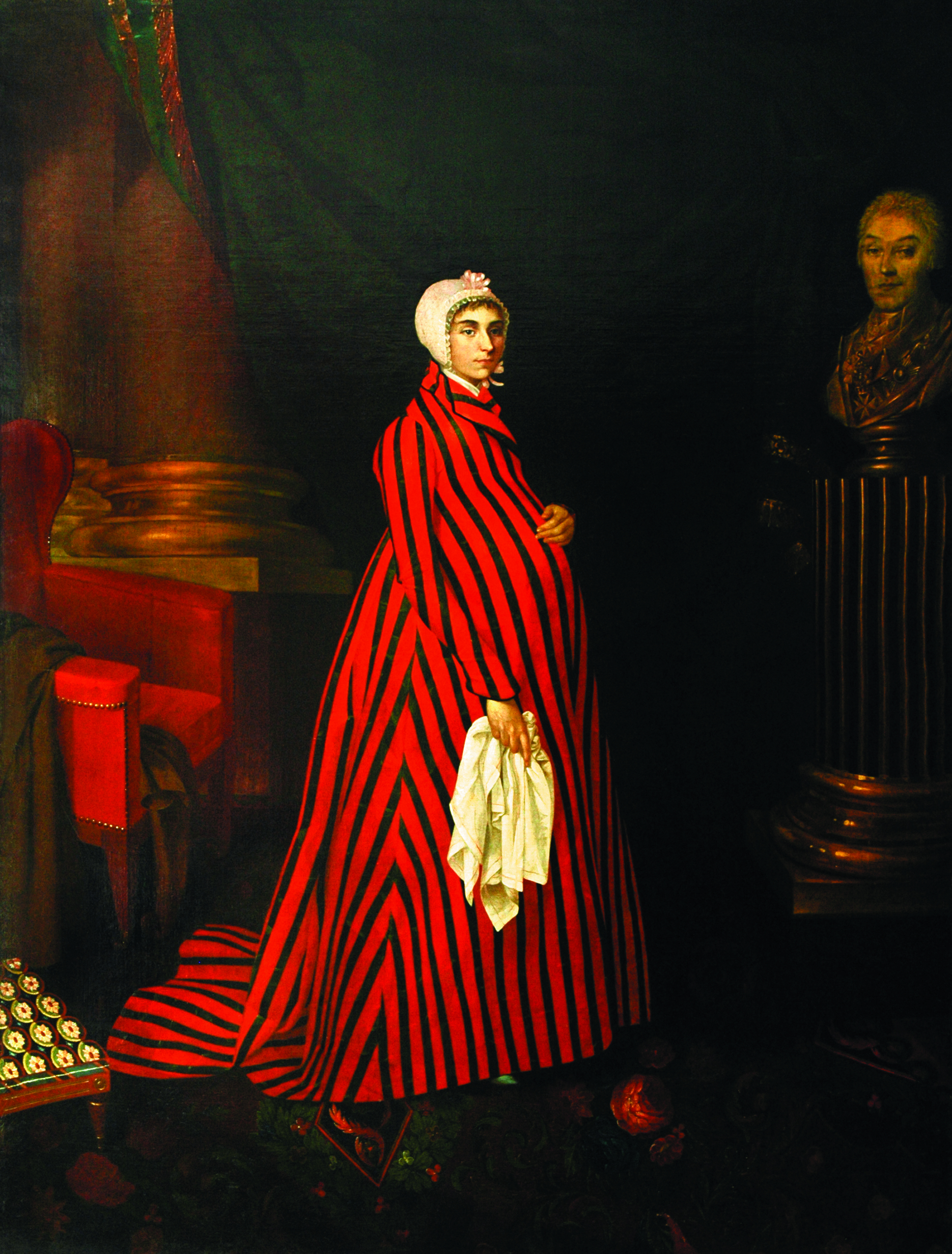
Praskovia Kovalyova by an artist of the Argunov family, 1803. She died in childbirth, so the painting may be a posthumous version of an earlier head and shoulders.

Later portraits of pregnant women tended to be family members or at least friends of the artists; relatively few women, or their husbands, chose to commission expensive portraits (often only done once in a lifetime) showing them pregnant, although many women spent most of at least the early years of their married life pregnant. The most common moment for a woman to have her portrait painted was just after her marriage, when any suggestion of pregnancy would be unwanted. In some well-documented cases, the subjects of portraits can be shown to be well into pregnancy when the portrait was painted, but this is "suppressed" or "concealed" in the image. It was a relatively simple matter for a portraitist to remove or add a pregnant belly to a painting.

Several of the paintings (which are not portraits, though no doubt models from his circle were used) of Vermeer have been said to show pregnant women, but specialists mostly discount this. One specialist was not aware of any portrait showing a pregnant woman from the whole of Dutch Golden Age painting. Though examples of pregnancy in Dutch art do exist. Most notably in the work of Jan Steen, who depicted pregnant women in tavern scenes (e.g. 'Tavern scene with a pregnant host' in the Philadelphia Museum of Art) or in his numerous genre paintings concerning sick young women; their sickness usually involved morning sickness. Other examples are Rembrandt's Pendant portraits of Maerten Soolmans and Oopjen Coppit, that shows Oopjen Coppit in a heavily pregnant state, or his drawing of a pregnant woman. More examples are Hendrick van der Burgh's 'Courtyard Scene with Pregnant Woman' or 'The Doctor's Visit' by Frans van Mieris the Elder. In contrast to 16th-century styles, "the fashion that had developed by the 1620s was especially helpful for a person trying to hide a swelling belly", even if only in a portrait.

In 1904 a portrait of his wife by Lovis Corinth, dated five days before the birth, shows a profile view that emphasizes the pregnancy. The prolific Corinth painted several pregnant women, many apparently not portraits. Paula Modersohn-Becker painted herself as pregnant in 1906 before she had ever been so; in the following 18 months she had a daughter, dying three weeks later.

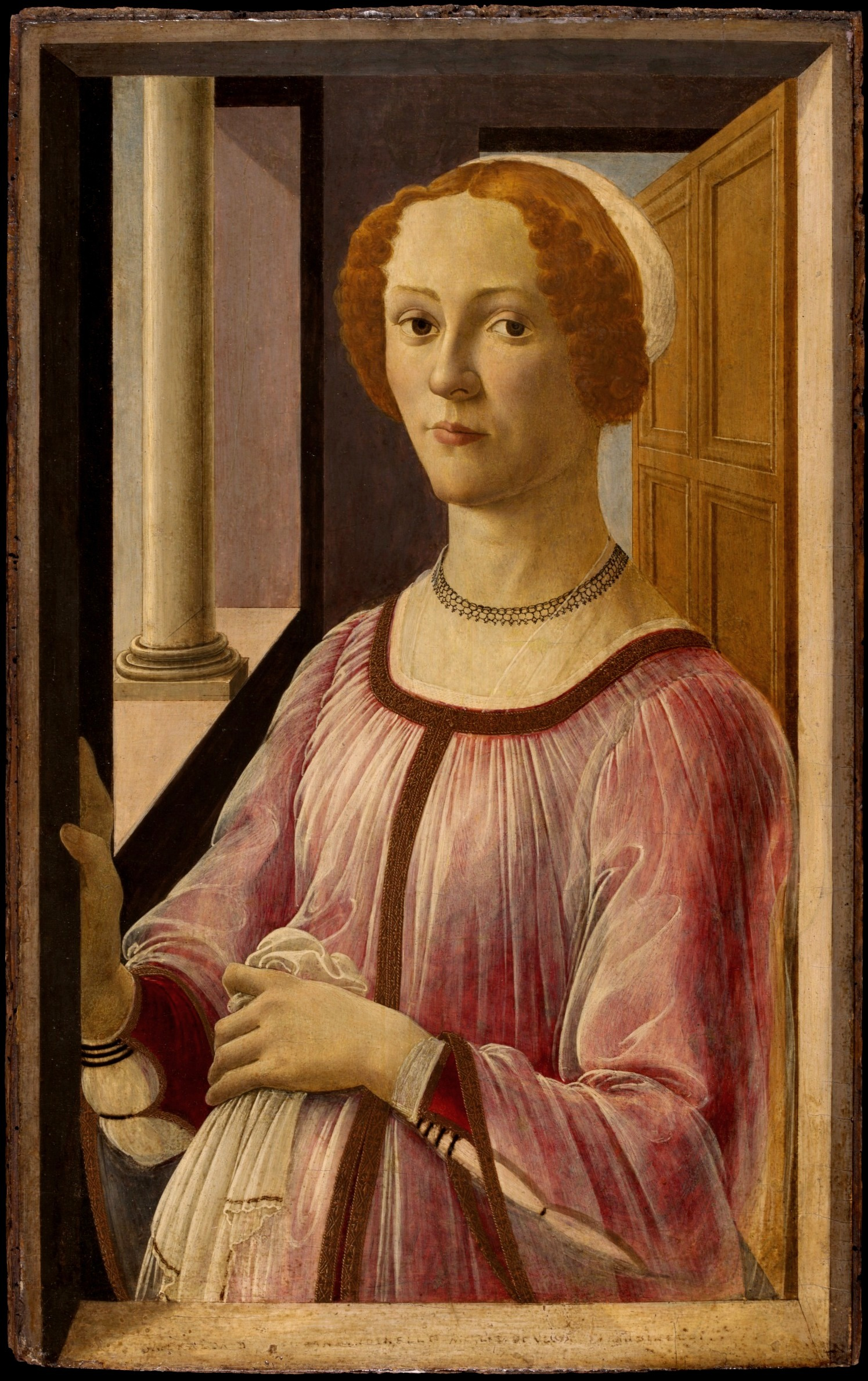
Botticelli's Portrait of a Lady Known as Smeralda Brandini, 1470s, hand on bump and guarnello

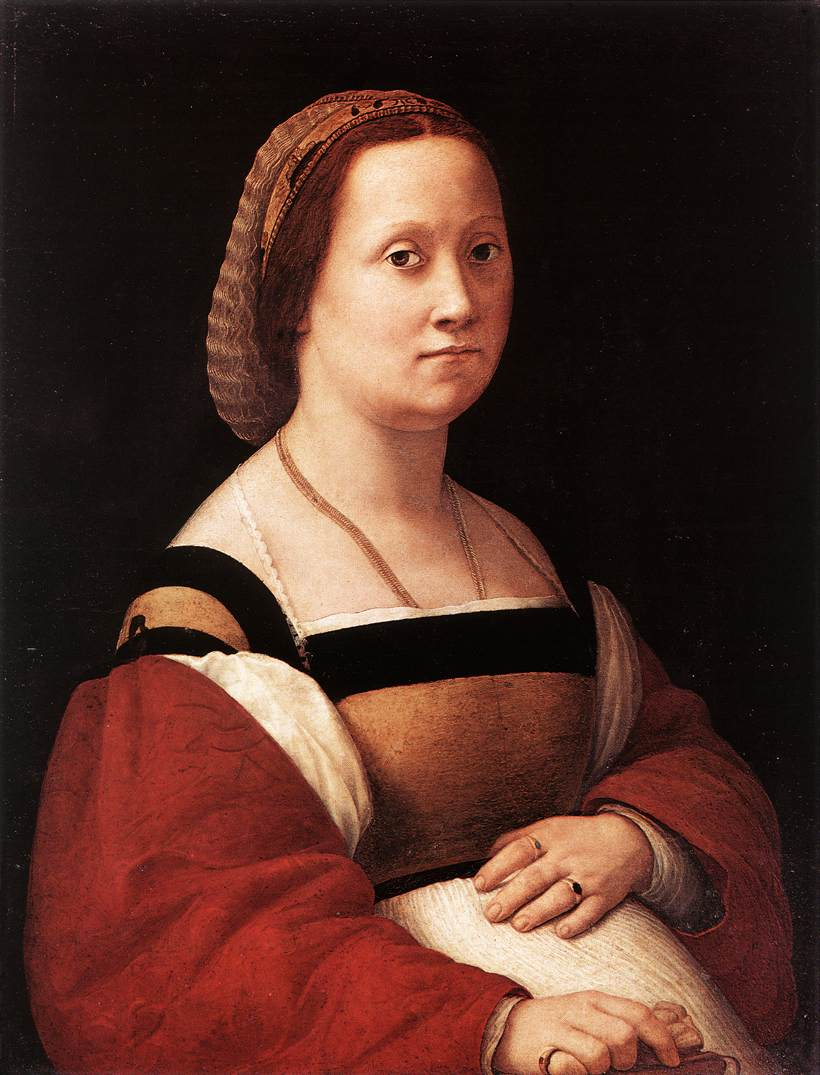
La Donna Gravida ("The Pregnant Lady") by Raphael, 1505–06

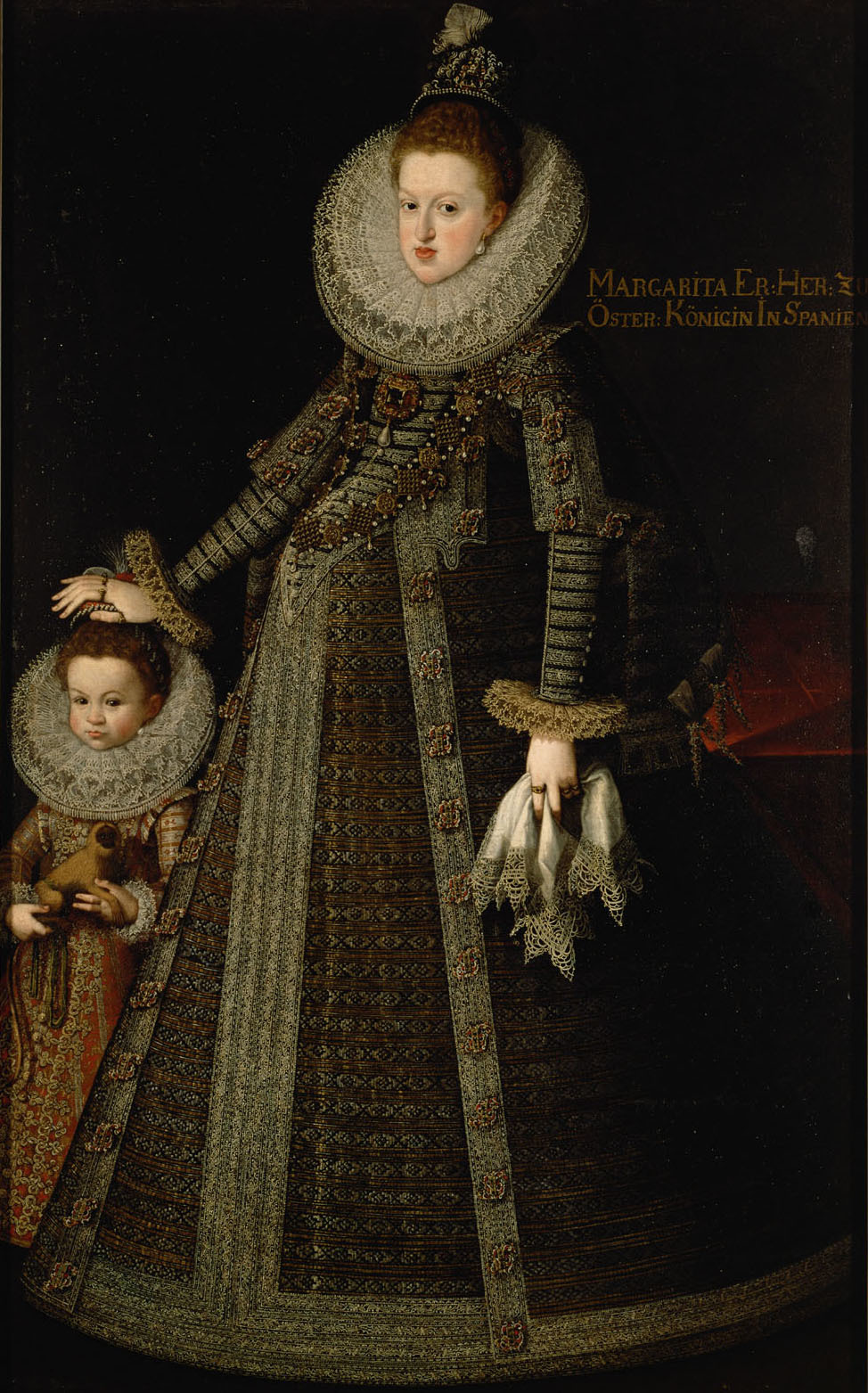
Margaret of Austria, Queen of Spain, probably pregnant with the future Philip IV, born in 1605. A variant of her standard official portrait.

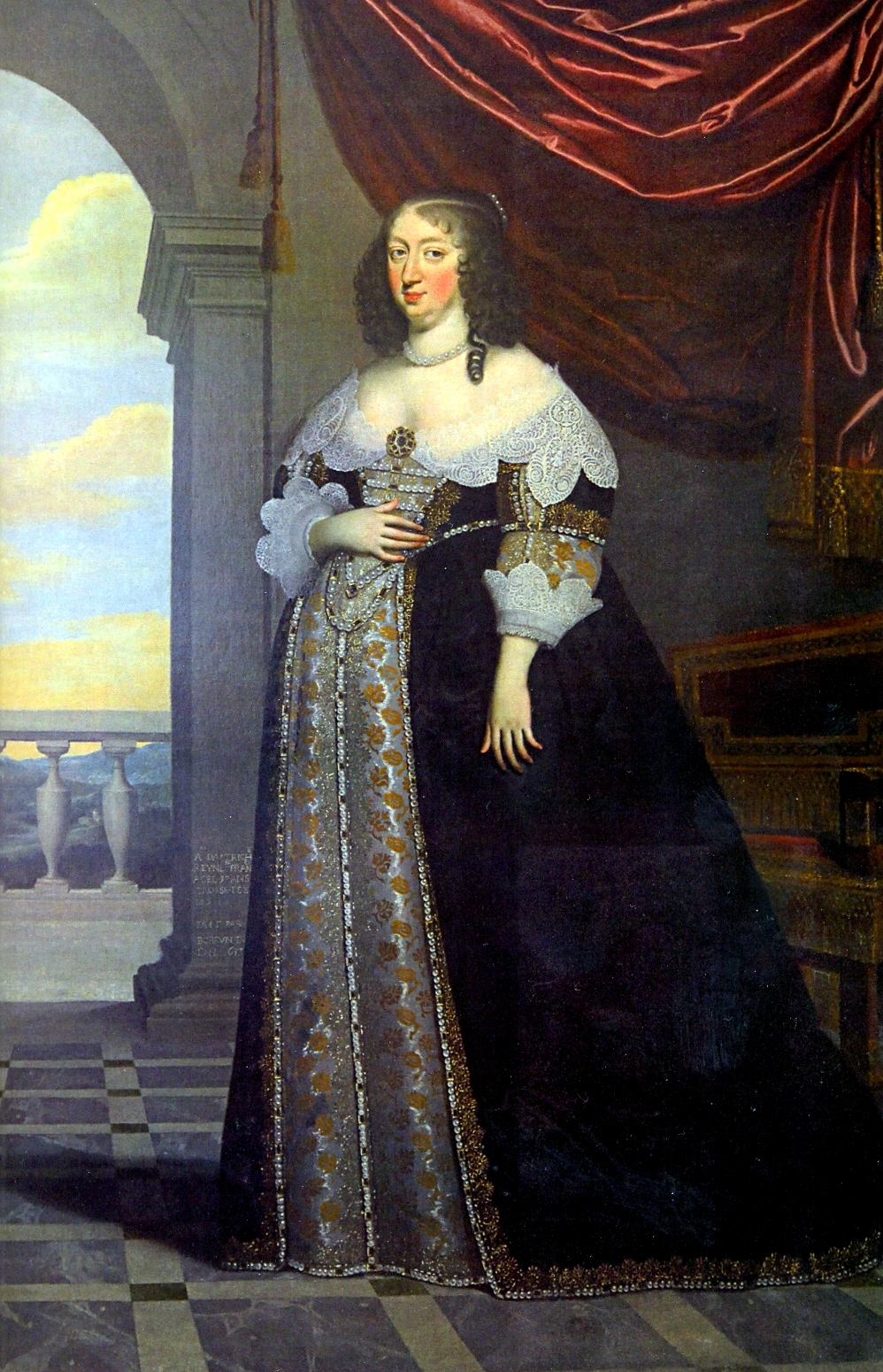
Anne of Austria, a month before the birth of Louis XIV in 1638. Anne stands next to her mother in the previous picture.

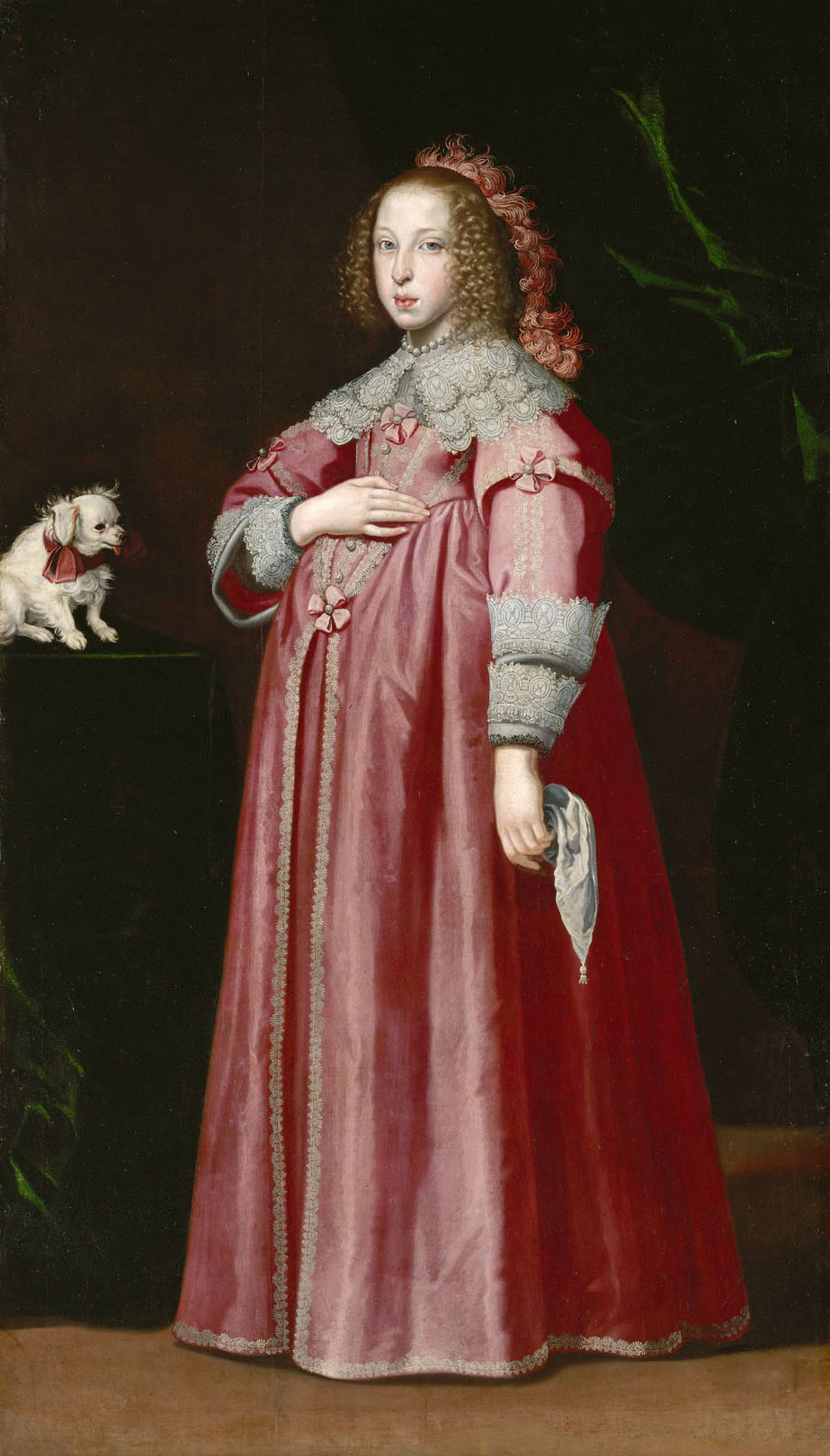
Maria Leopoldine of Austria, who died in childbirth at 16 in 1649, the year this portrait is dated. It may have been done after her death.

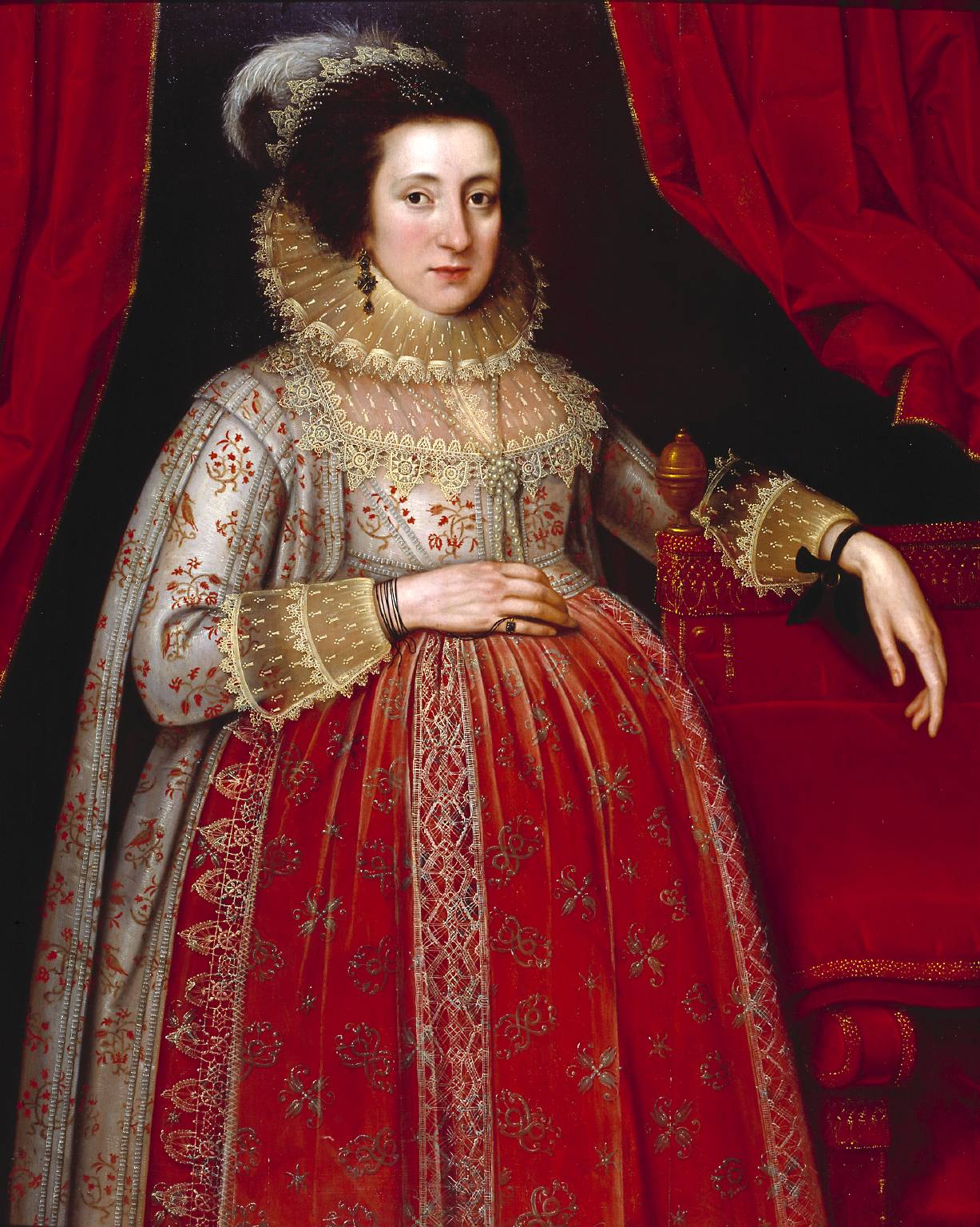
English pregnancy portrait by Marcus Gheeraerts the Younger, 1620

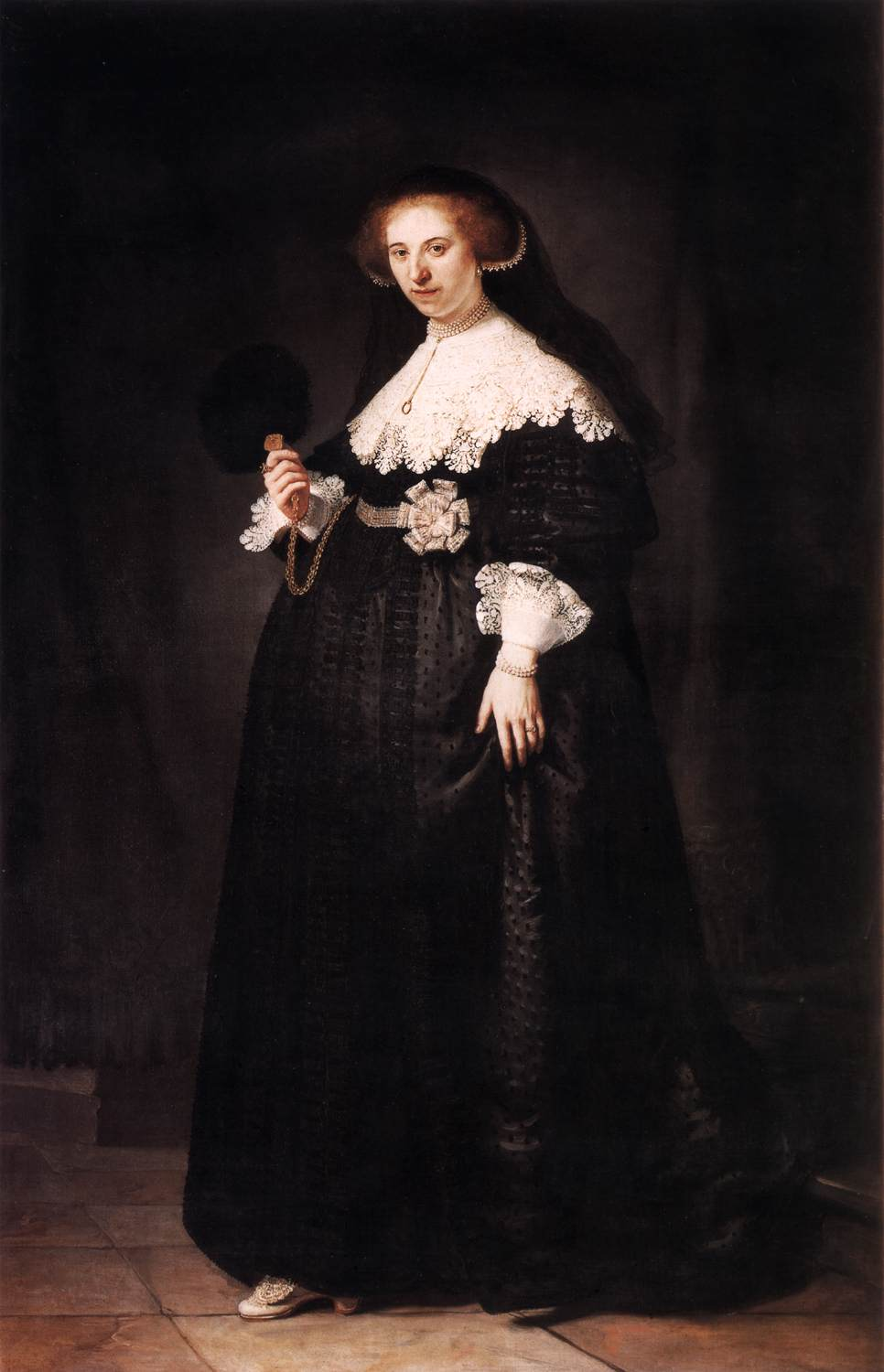
Portrait of Oopjen Coppit Rembrandt, 1634

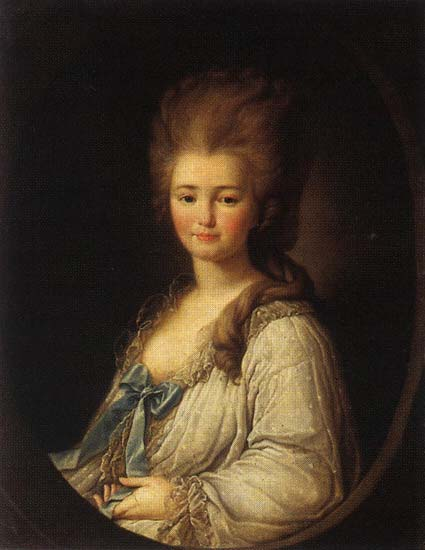
Russian portrait of Alexandra Branitskaya by Leontiy Semeonovich Miropolskiy, 1780s

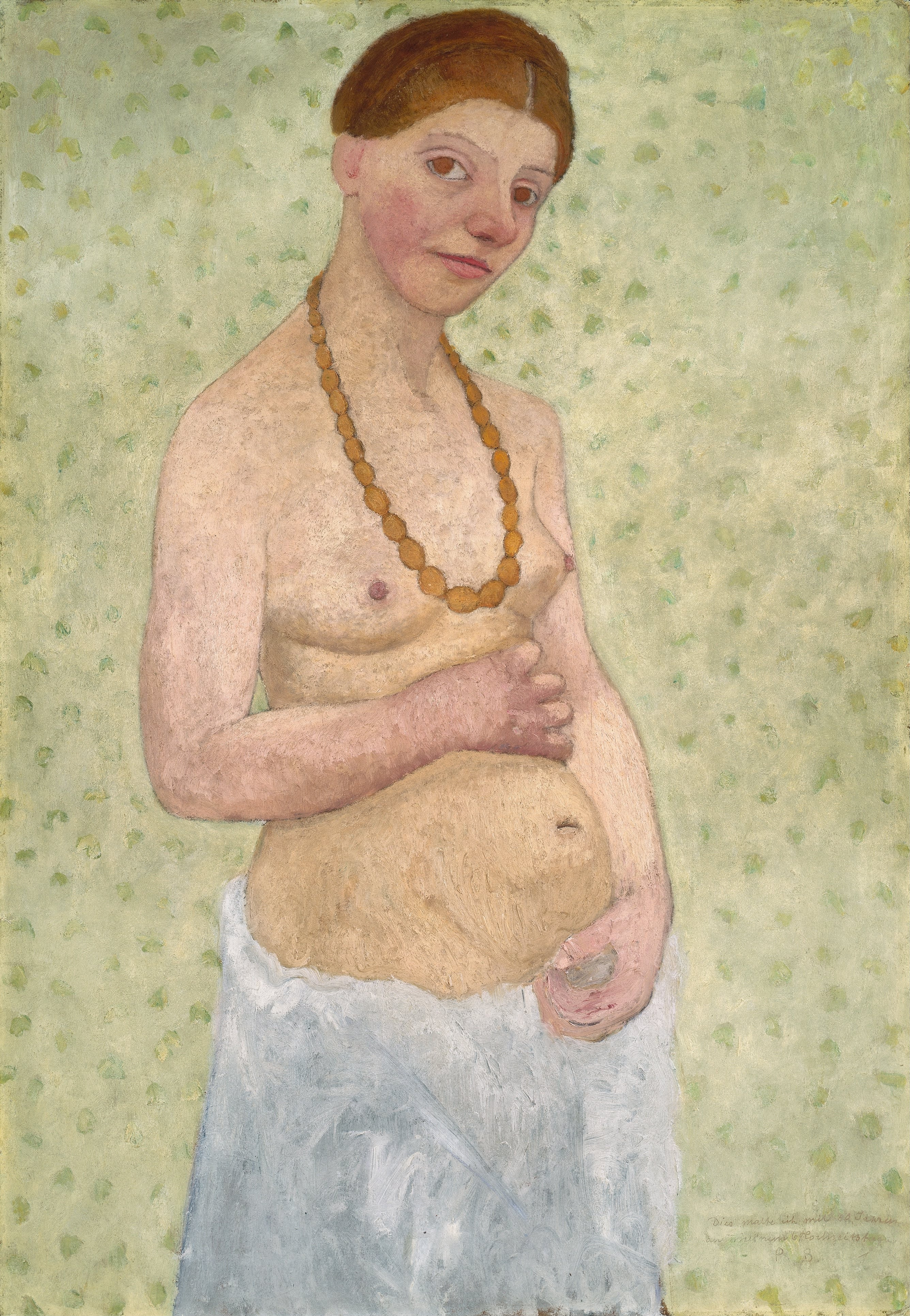
Paula Modersohn-Becker, Selbstbildnis am 6 Hochzeitstag ("Self-portrait on her 6th wedding anniversary") 1906

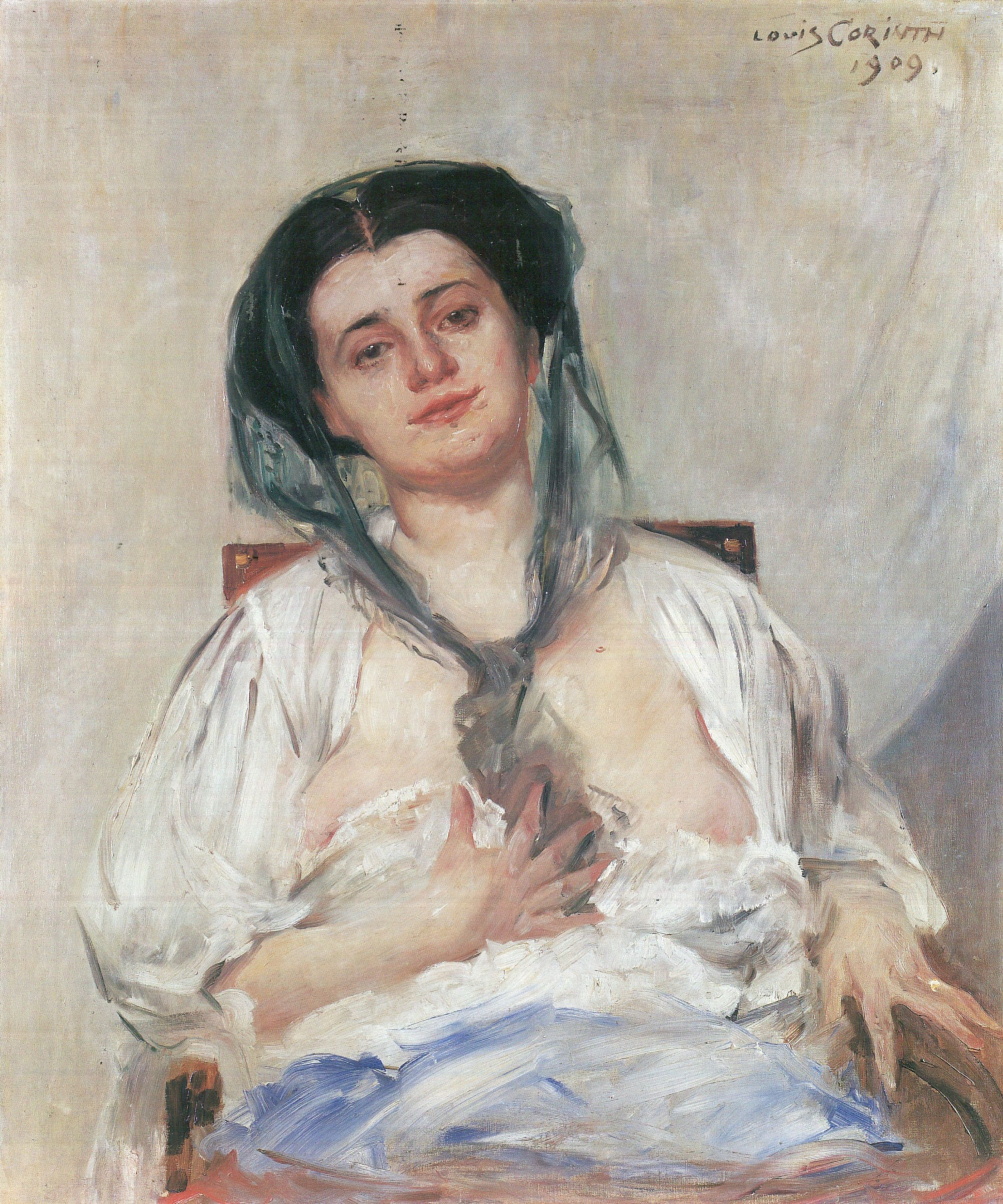
Lovis Corinth, Donna Gravida, 1909

=== Moralizing genre or satire ===
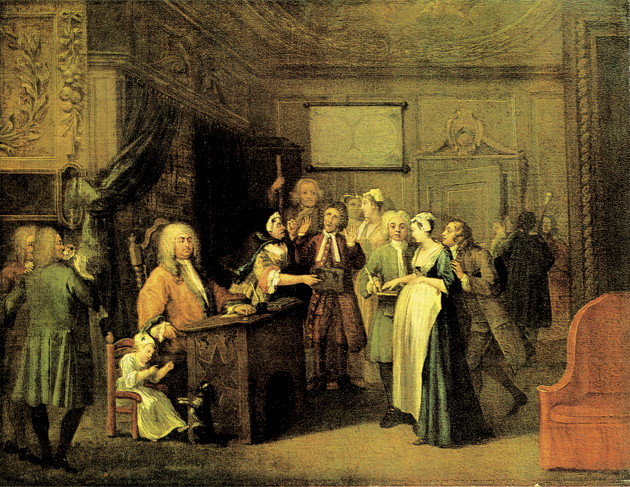
William Hogarth, A Woman Swearing a Child to a Grave Citizen c.1729

Some Early Modern depictions in genre painting, or other media such as popular prints or book illustrations, addressed the social implications of pregnancy, either showing women who were seen as having more children than they could afford, or women, especially maids, who had become pregnant outside marriage, with dire social implications for them.

There are a number of narrative scenes which show unwanted pregnancies essentially from the father's point of view, including some where the woman has brought the matter before local magistrates to award financial support, as unmarried women were able to do in England (uniquely, according to Bernard Picart, who poured scorn on the law). The English artist William Hogarth included many pregnant women in his works, usually with a satirical or comic intention, and generally more often giving a negative implication than a positive one. In Hogarth's A Woman Swearing a Child to a Grave Citizen (or The Denunciation, c.1729, National Gallery of Ireland) a young woman falsely accuses a rich old man of fathering her child, while the real father advises her. The verses on the print version summarize the situation:

Here pregnant Madam screens the real Sire,/And falsly swears her Bastard Child for Hire/Upon a Rich old Letcher, who denies/The Fact, and vows the naughty Hussif lies;/His Wife enrag'd, exclaims against her Spouse,/And swears she'l be reveng'd upon his Brows;/The Jade, the Justice and Church Ward'ns agree,/And force him to provide Security.

In particular Hogarth depicted a number of pregnant ballad-sellers, and ones with young children. Since the job required little movement, it was perhaps often taken during pregnancy, but Hogarth seems to have reflected a set of contemporary ideas using pregnancy as a metaphor for printing as a means of reproduction.

Hogarth gallery

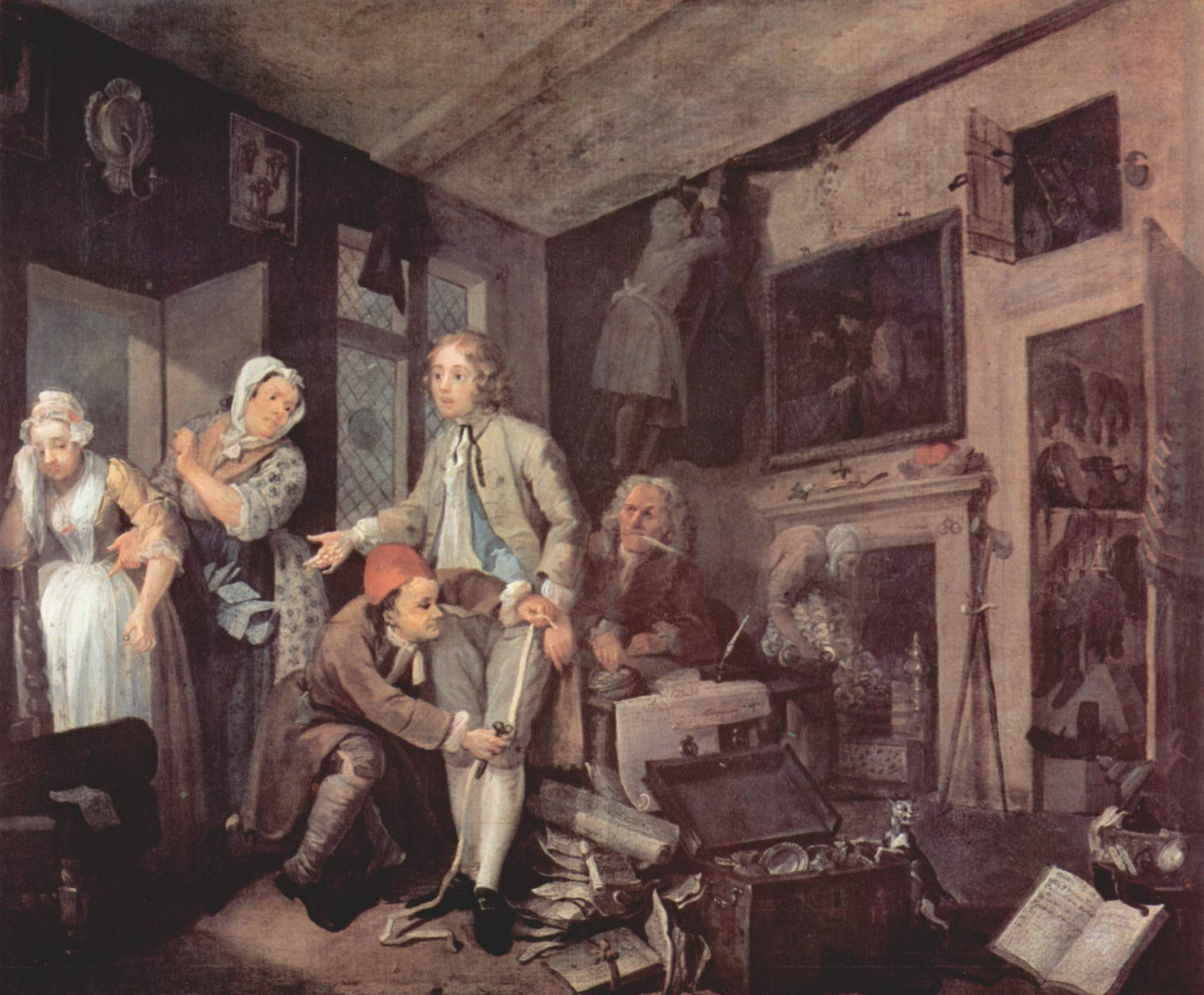
A Rake's Progress, 1, The Young Heir Takes Possession Of The Miser's Effects, abandoning his pregnant fiancée

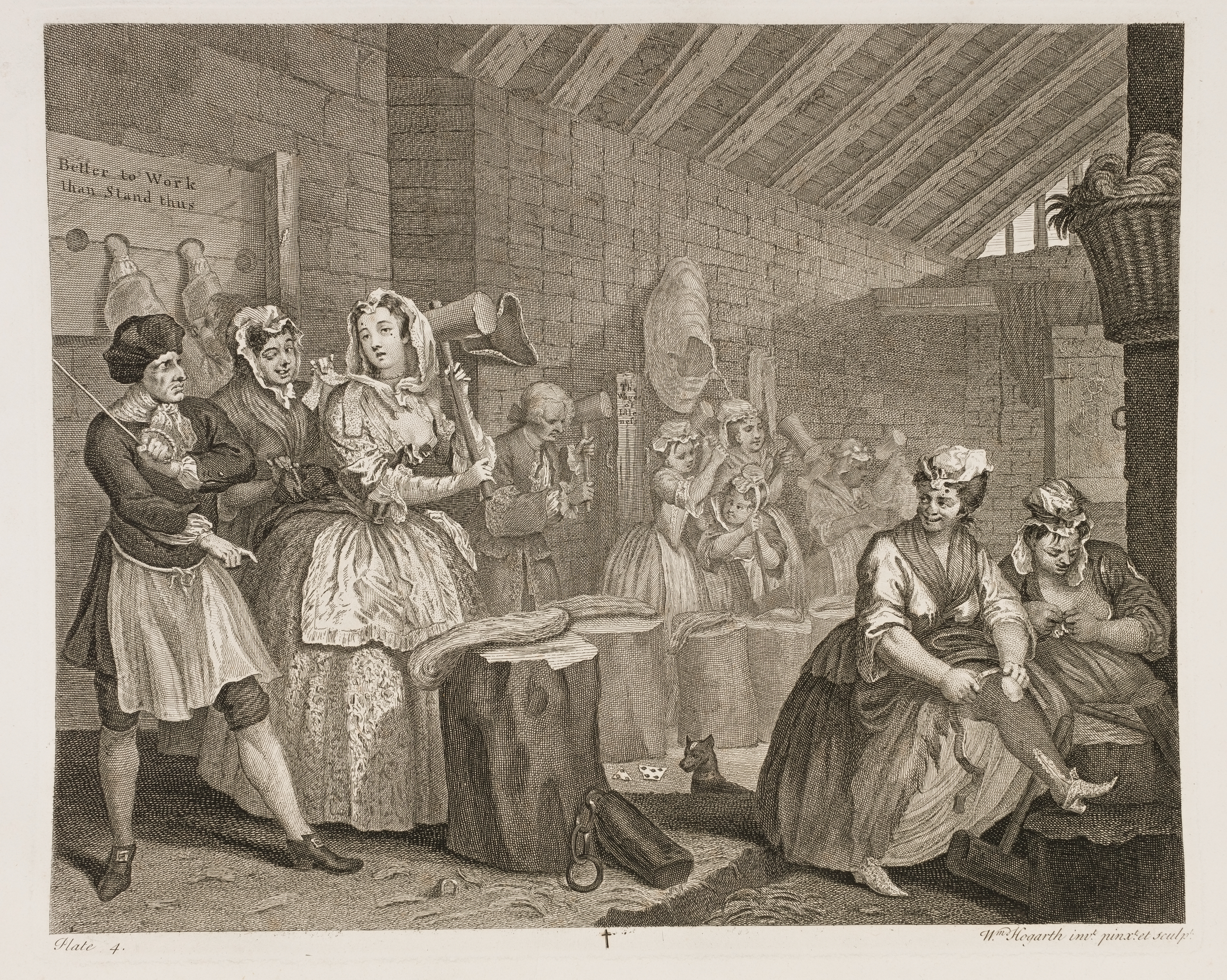
From A Harlot's Progress, 1732. The background prisoners include a pregnant black woman, perhaps a prostitute.

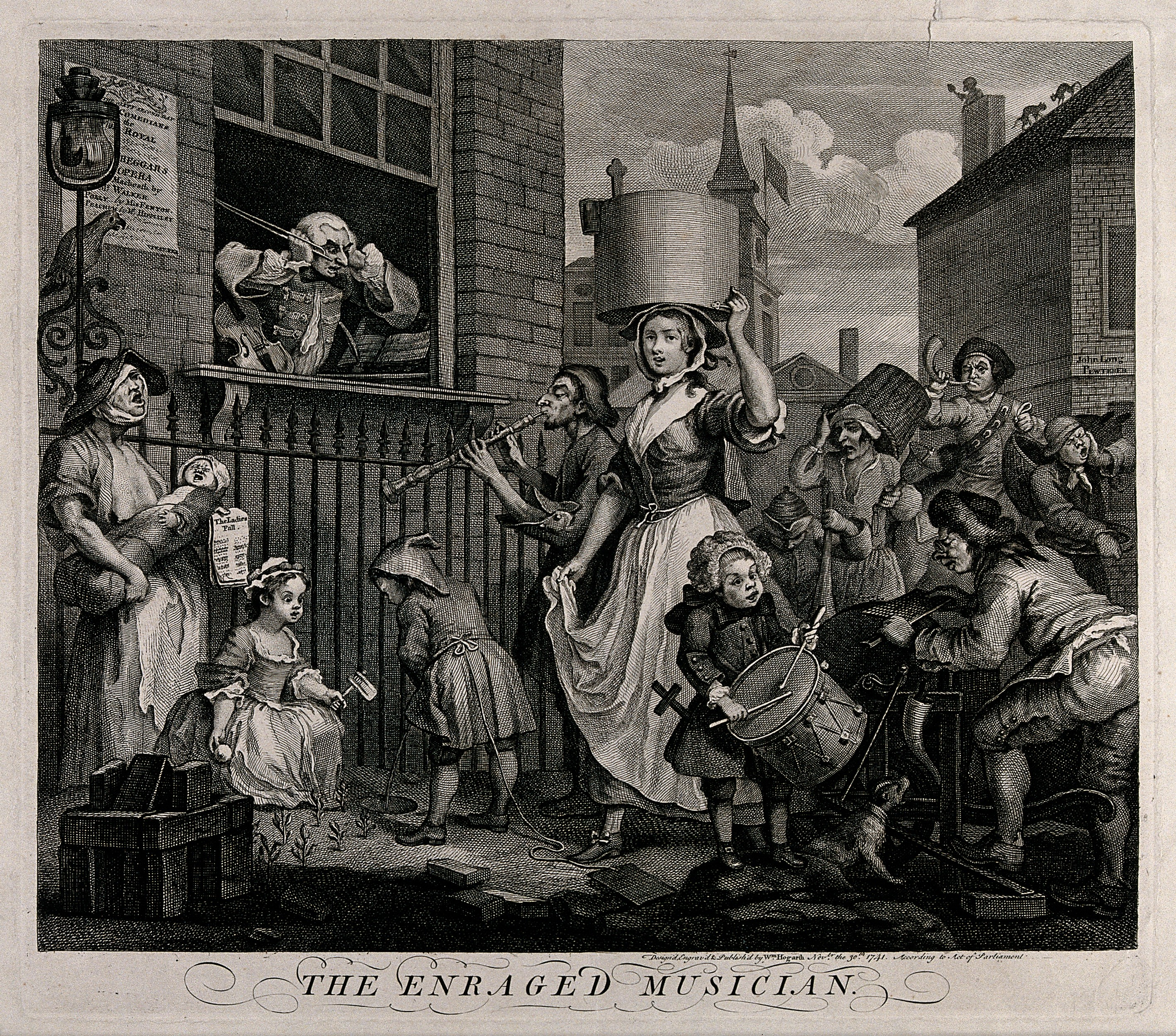
The Enraged Musician, with a pregnant ballad-seller at left

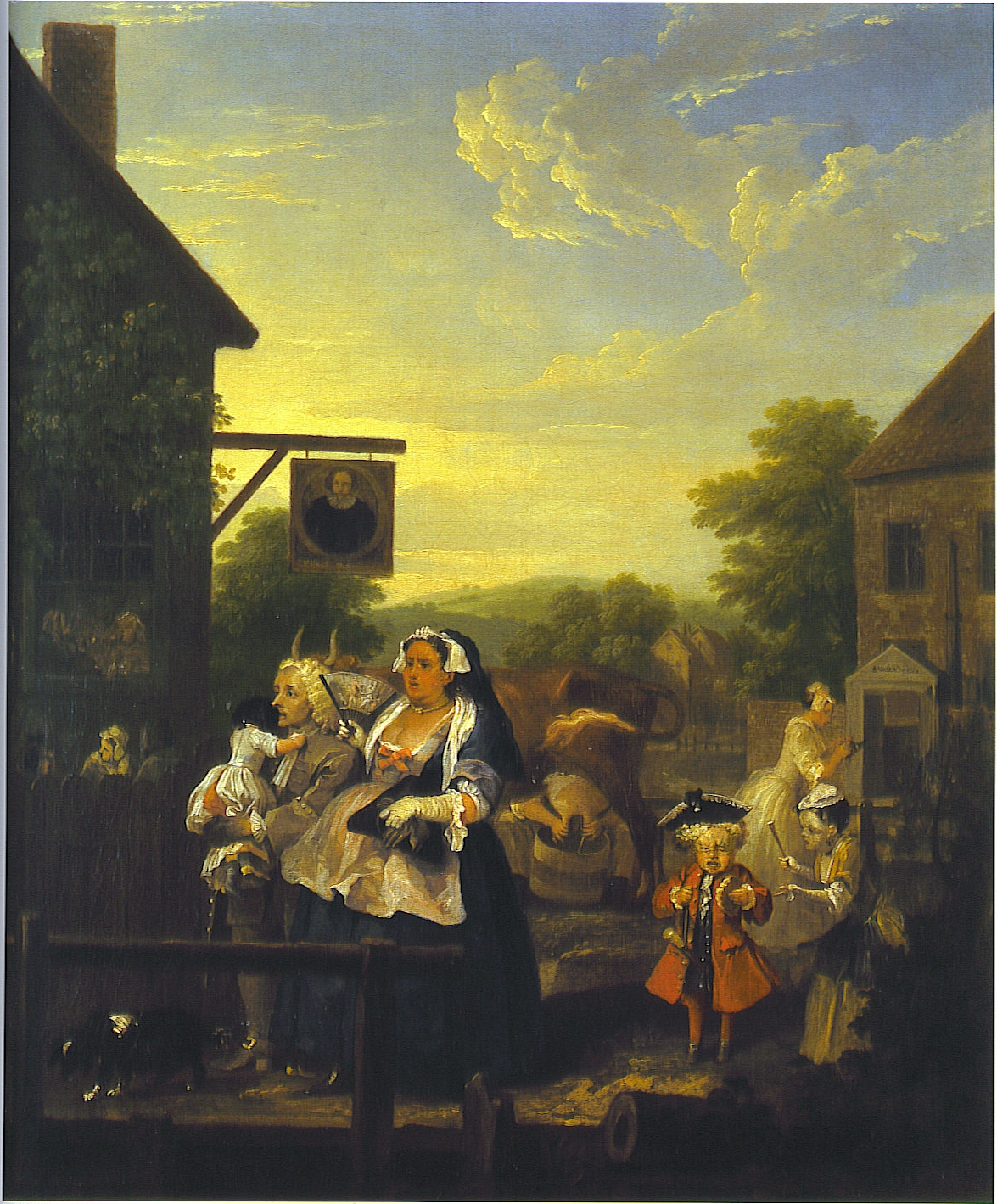
Evening, from the Four Times of Day. The cow's horns over the husband suggest he has been cuckolded.

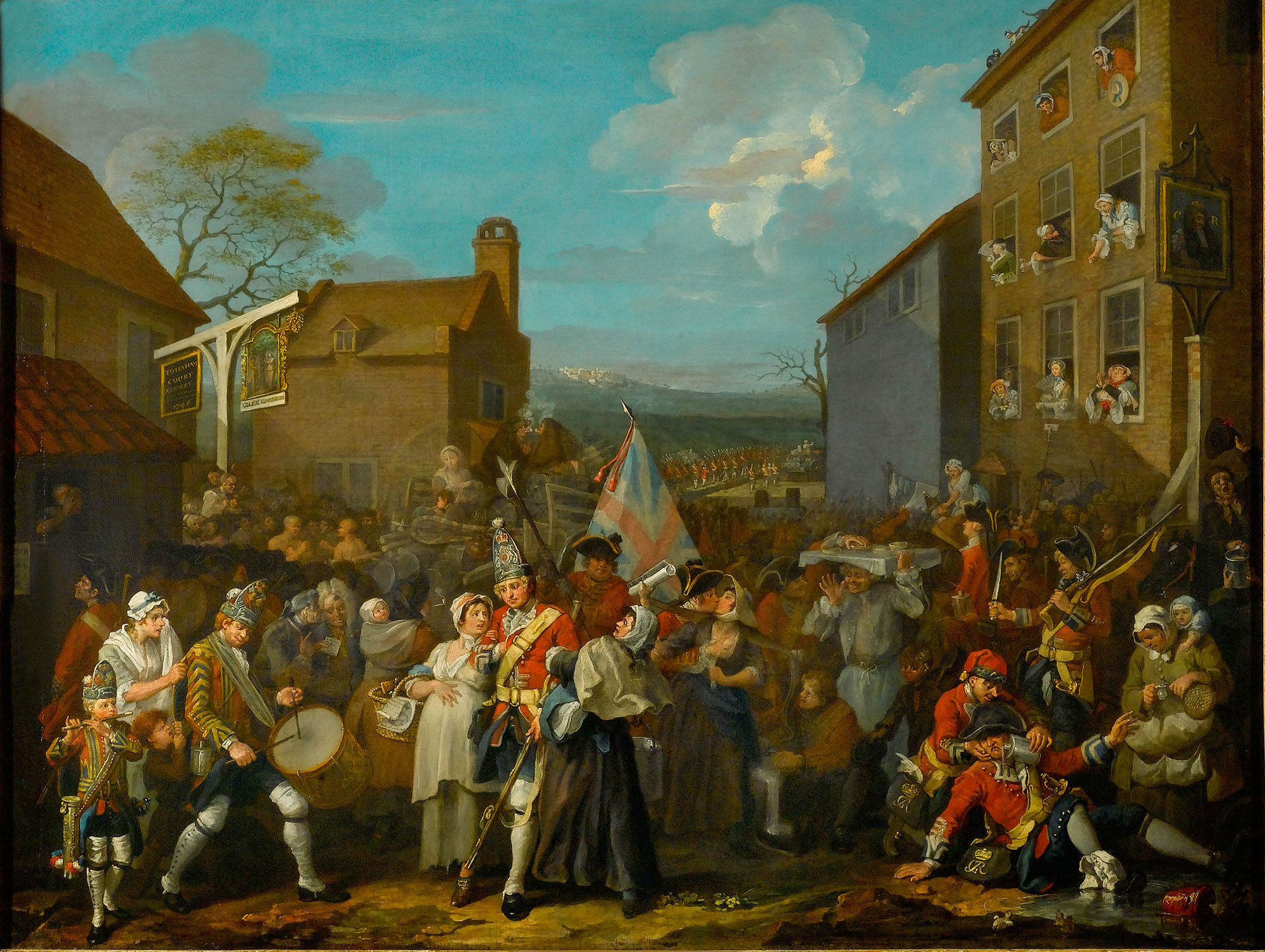
The March of the Guards to Finchley, 1749–50, with soldier and pregnant ballad-seller in foreground. Her basket has copies of "God Save the King".

=== Modern ===
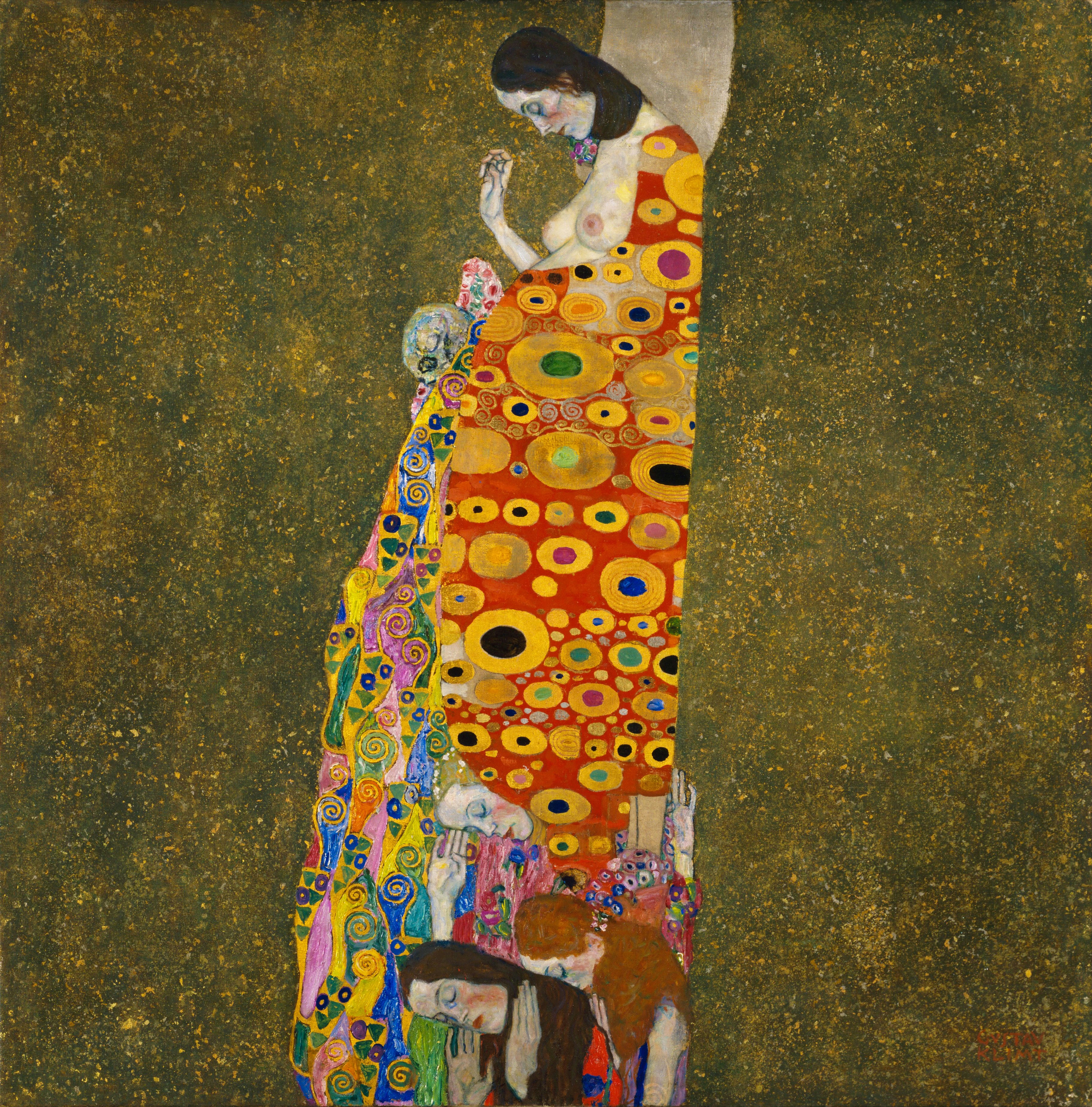
Hoffnung II ("Hope II"), Gustav Klimt, 1907-08

As the modern era approached, some artists began to show pregnancy more explicitly, with heavily pregnant figures, and more pregnant nudes than before. Two paintings (not portraits as such) by Gustav Klimt, Hope I (1903) and Hope II (1907–08), show slim, heavily pregnant women in profile. In Hope I the figure is nude, and the pregnancy very evident, while in Hope II a huge and elaborate dress or cloak makes this less immediately clear.

Egon Schiele made pregnant nudes the subject of many of his drawings with colour, favouring a frontal view. The Pregnant Woman by Pablo Picasso was a sculpture dedicated to his then partner Francoise Gilot and was made out of plaster, metal armature, wood, ceramic vessels and jars. Picasso wanted to inspire Gilot to have a third child with him by making this sculpture.

Pregnant woman was the most famous painting in a series of paintings of seven pregnant nude women painted by Alice Neel. Pregnant girl was a painting of 1960–61 by Lucian Freud that portrayed his then girlfriend Bernadine Coverley, when she was pregnant with their daughter Bella. There have been nude sculptures of heavily pregnant women by, among others, Damien Hirst, with The Virgin Mother (now at Lever House in New York) and Verity, 2012, and Ron Mueck, whose Pregnant Woman (2002) is a 2.5-metre-tall sculpture of a naked pregnant woman clasping her hands above her head, now in the National Gallery of Australia.

== Medical illustration ==
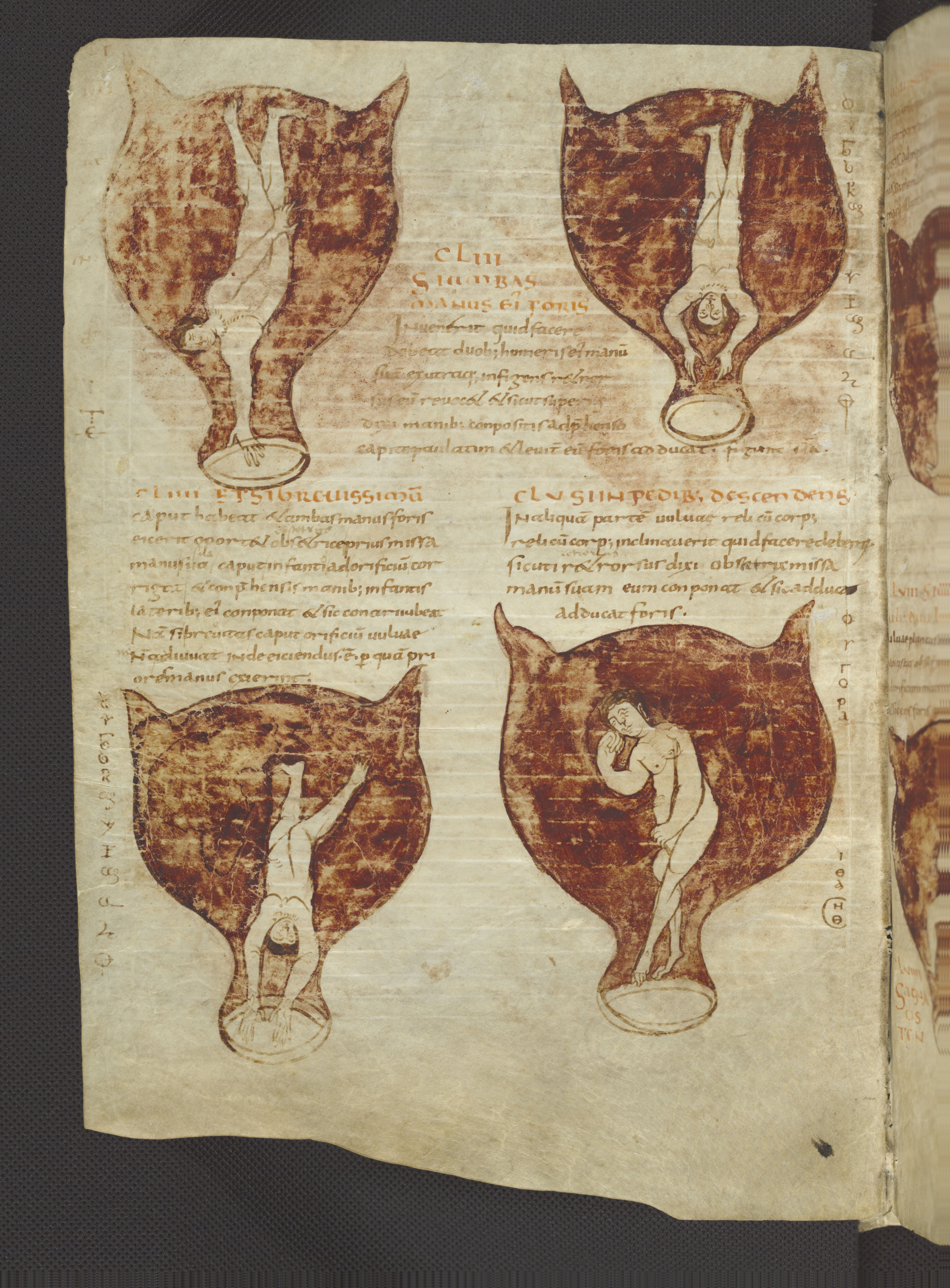
Page from the earliest manuscript of Muscio on midwifery, 9–11th century

In contrast to the general rarity of artistic depictions of pregnancy, in the field of medical illustration it has been one of the earliest and commonest subjects, with the same "cutaway drawing" approach found in some medieval religious works typically used. The foetus is generally the main focus of interest, rather than the mother. Most early depictions used in manuals on midwifery were very inaccurate, but still useful for showing the positions for delivery in childbirth. They were based on the re-copying over many generations of images from medical texts going back to Soranus of Ephesus in antiquity and Muscio in about 500.

The accurate drawings by Leonardo da Vinci may have been the first to be made, but professional medical texts took centuries to catch up. The Scottish anatomist William Hunter, doctor to Queen Charlotte, was an admirer of Leonardo's drawings in the Royal Collection and learnt from their clear depictions. His own work, The Anatomy of the Gravid Uterus Exhibited in Figures, was published in 1774 and based on extensive study of late pregnant corpses; how he obtained so many was the subject of suspicion at the time and subsequently.

== Art for pregnant women ==
Some kinds of art have been designed with pregnant women especially in mind, though these are perhaps less common than art intended for women wanting to become pregnant (discussed in art history using the term "fertility"). One of the many contexts and uses speculated for Venus figurines is that they were held in the hand during childbirth, for which their rather consistent size and shape seems well suited. However, there are a variety of other explanations.

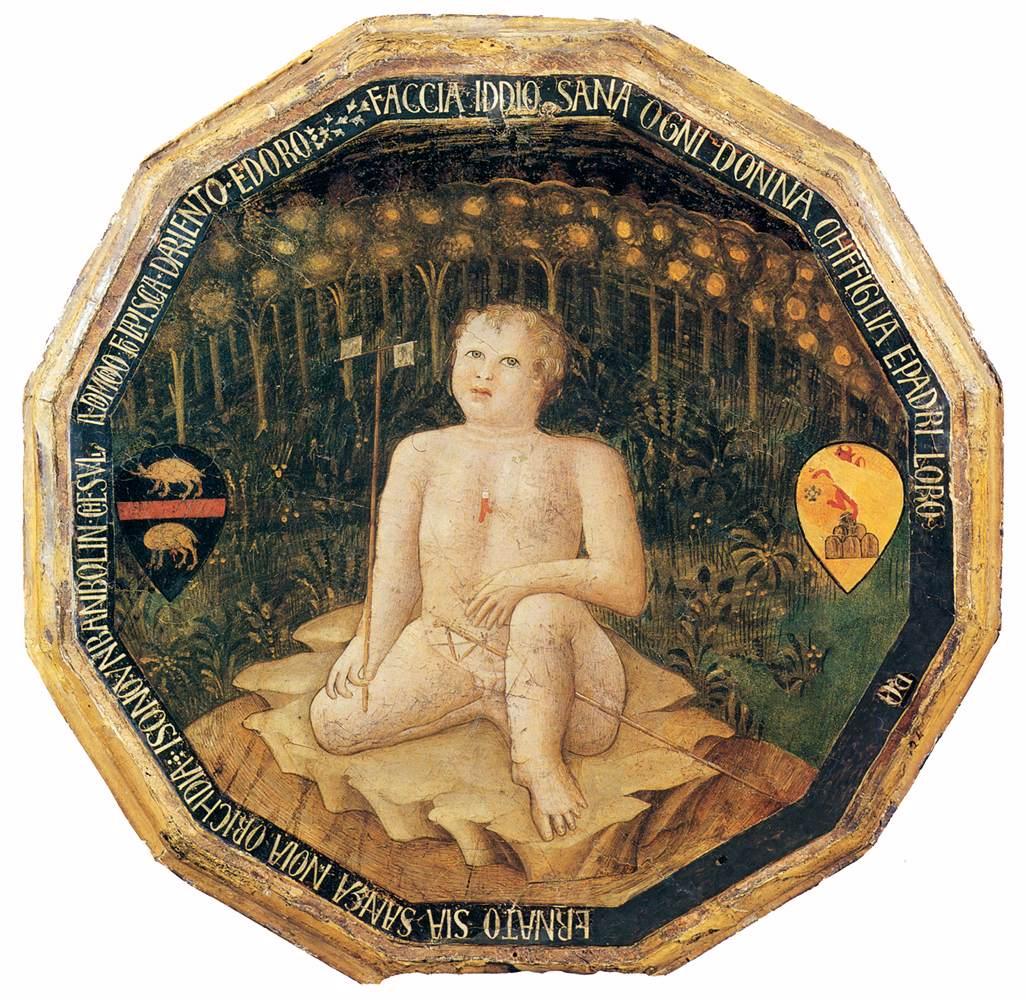
Bartolomeo di Fruosino, 1420, a typical desco da parto (verso) with heraldry and a baby boy urinating, to encourage positive thoughts during pregnancy, and even the birth of such a child

The Madonna del Parto and other images of the pregnant Virgin Mary were often mainly designed to offer a focus for the devotions of pregnant women and those concerned for them. In 1954 the mayor of Monterchi, home of the Piero della Francesca Madonna, refused to lend it to an exhibition in Florence so as not to deprive the population of its benefits.

The painted desco da parto ("birth tray" or "birth salver") was an important symbolic gift for married women in late medieval and Early Modern Florence and Siena. Both sides were typically painted, but with different types of scenes. The upper side (or recto) generally had a crowded figure scene, usually secular, such as a scene from classical myth or a suitable allegory. Scenes from the Old Testament or the Christian religious repertoire also appear in some cases. Birthing scenes were popular.

The underside or verso generally has a simpler and often less elevated subject, with fewer, larger figures, and usually includes heraldry, with the arms of both parents shown. Scenes with one or two naked boy toddlers, with the coats of arms of both parents at the sides, are especially popular.

In the Renaissance it was believed that the sights a pregnant woman saw affected her pregnancy and even what it produced. Martin Luther told the cautionary story of a woman frightened by a mouse in pregnancy, who then gave birth to a mouse. Manuals advised keeping images with a positive impact in the sight of pregnant women, and it is in this context that the recurrent naked boys, and the scenes showing the end of a successful childbirth, should be seen. This was also a factor in the display of images of the Virgin and Child, which were ubiquitous in bedrooms. Probably the desci were hung with the verso displayed during pregnancy, to promote the production of a similar healthy boy.

== Gallery ==
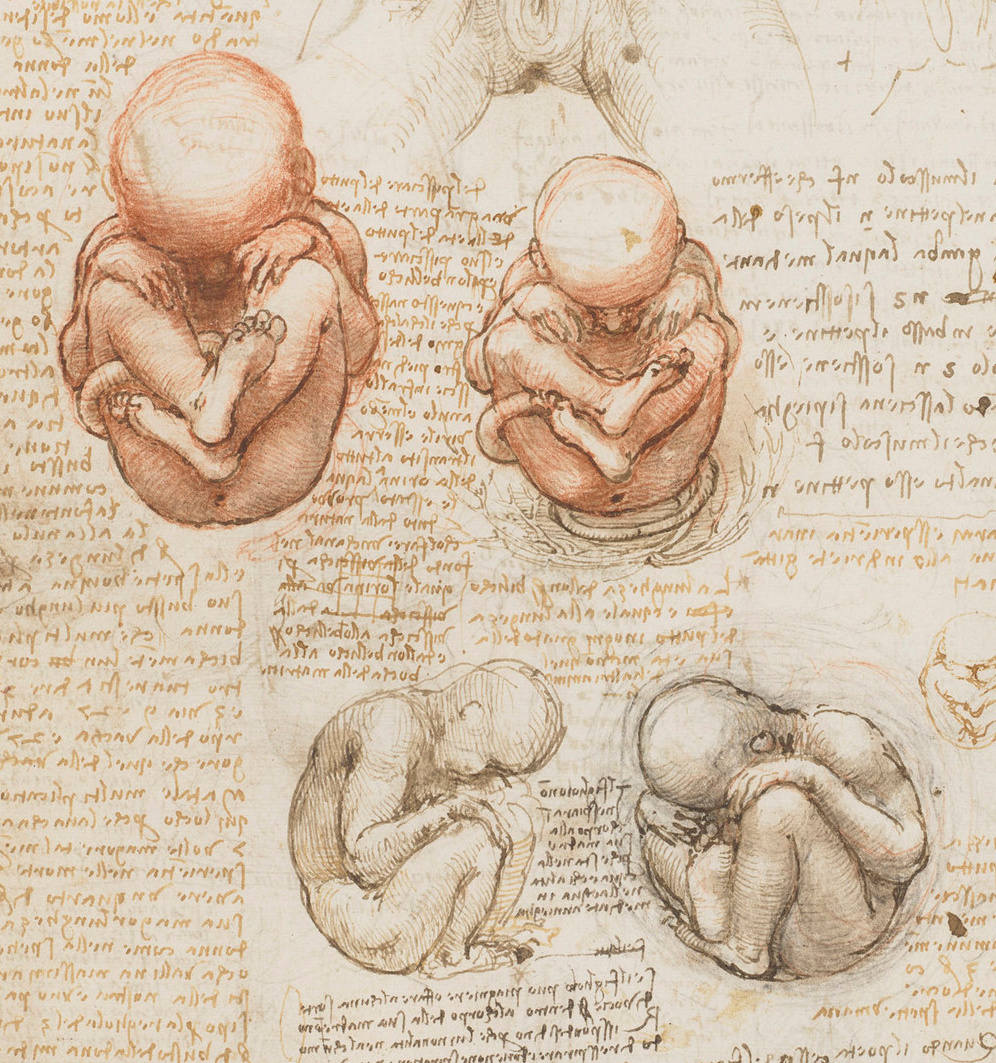
Leonardo da Vinci, Codex Windsor, 1510–1512

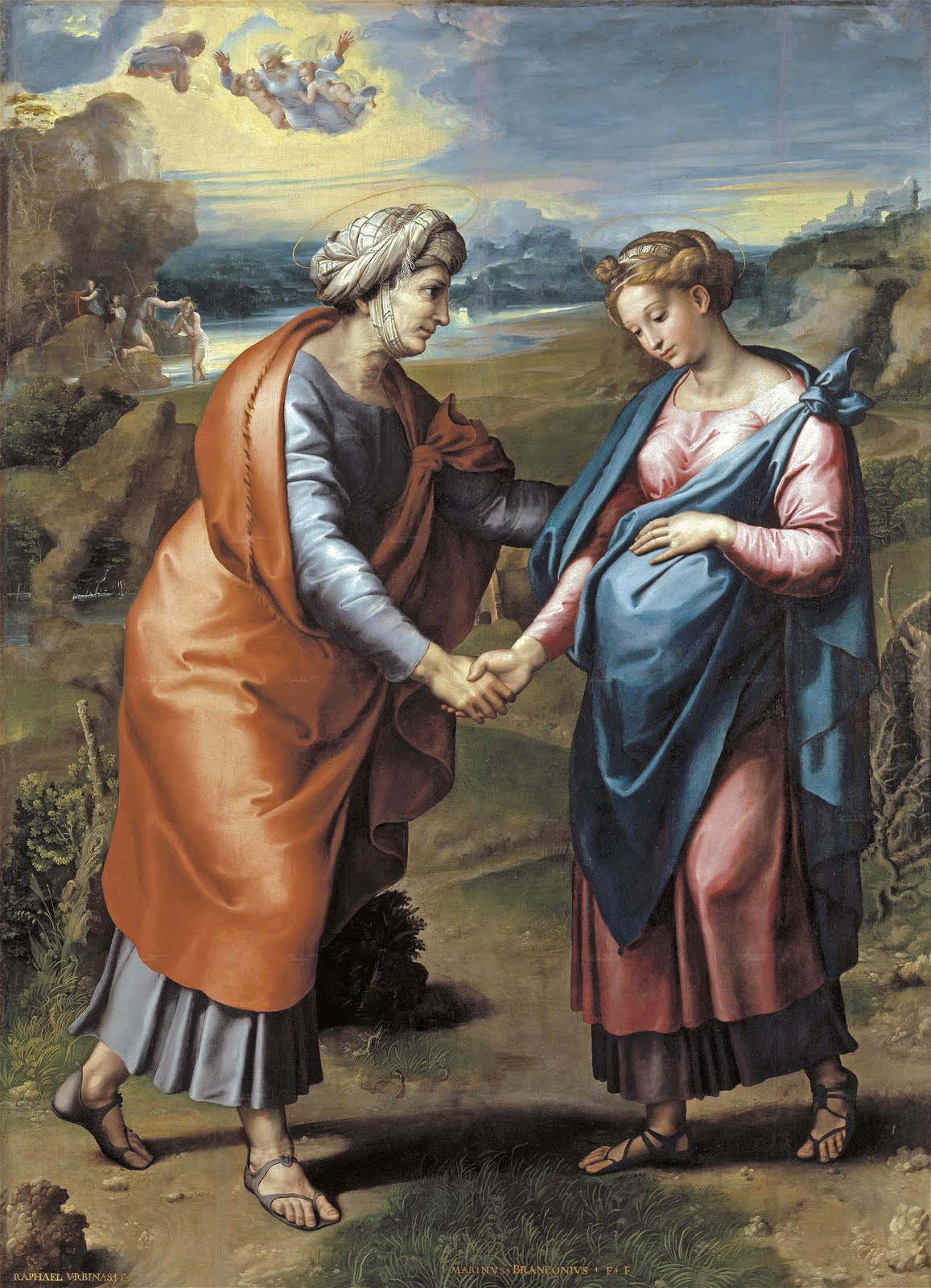
Visitation by Raphael, c. 1517

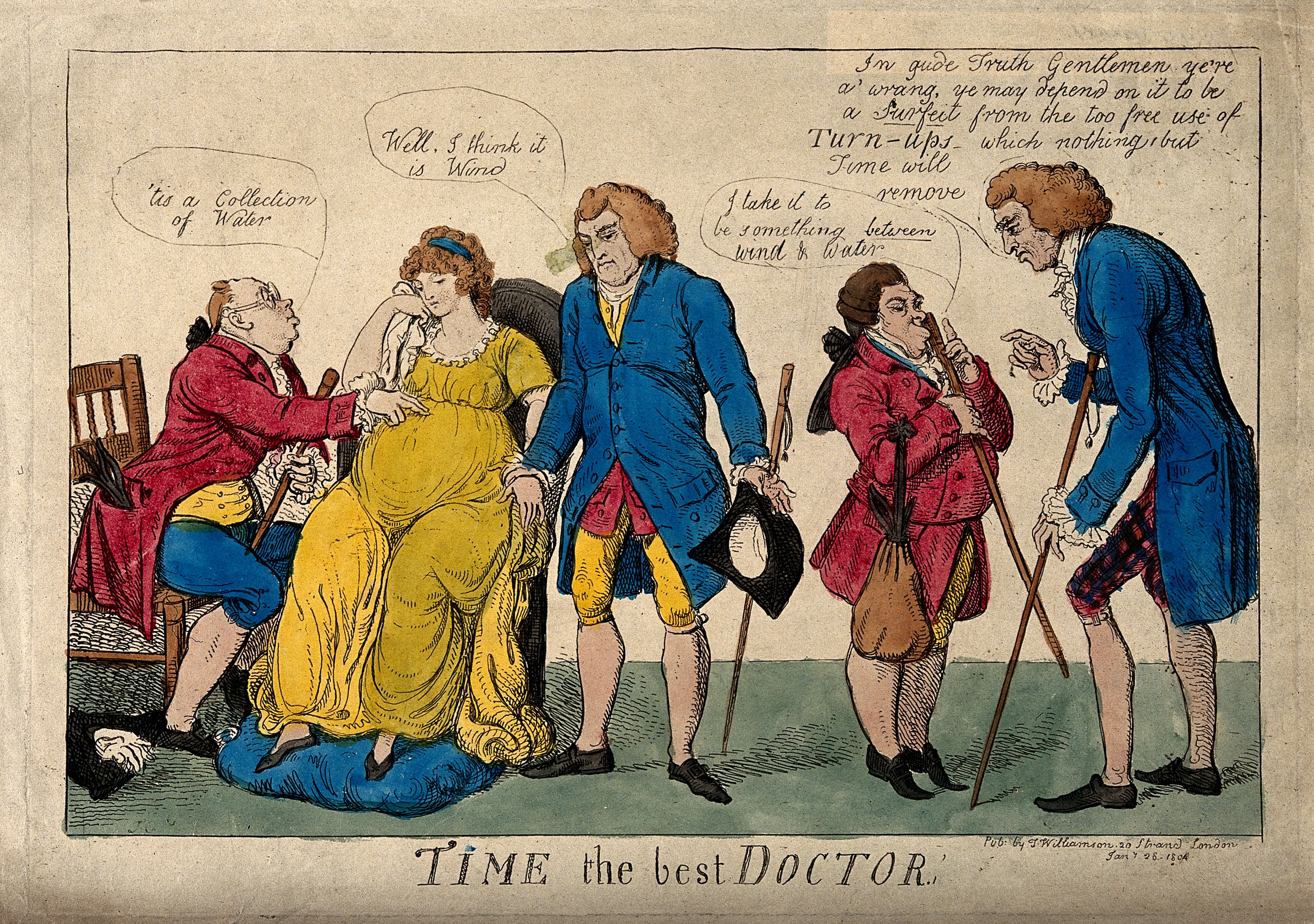
Doctors misdiagnose a pregnancy, Isaac Cruikshank, 1803

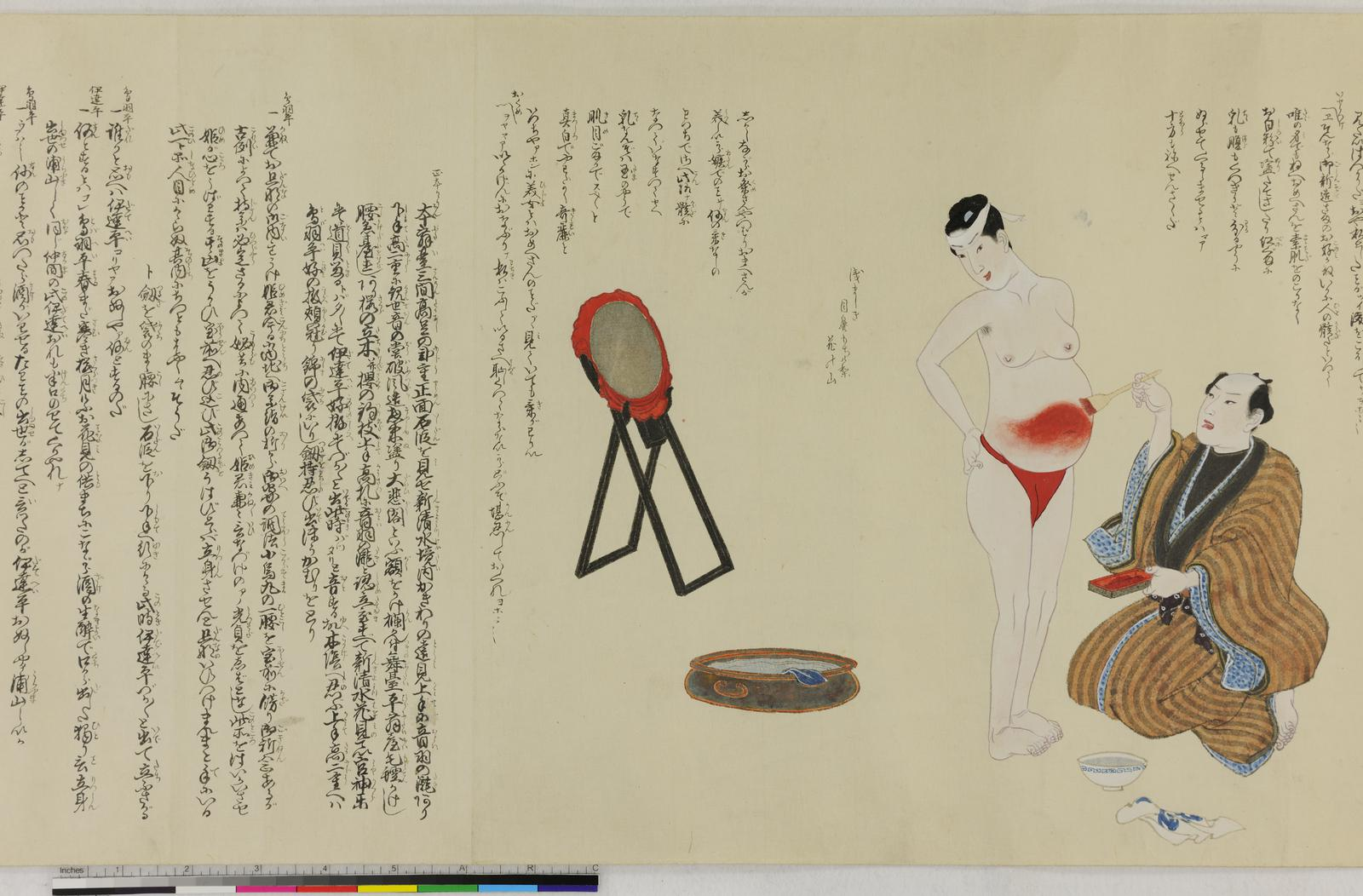
Picture of the tragic and gory story about the life of a travelling actress called Okume.

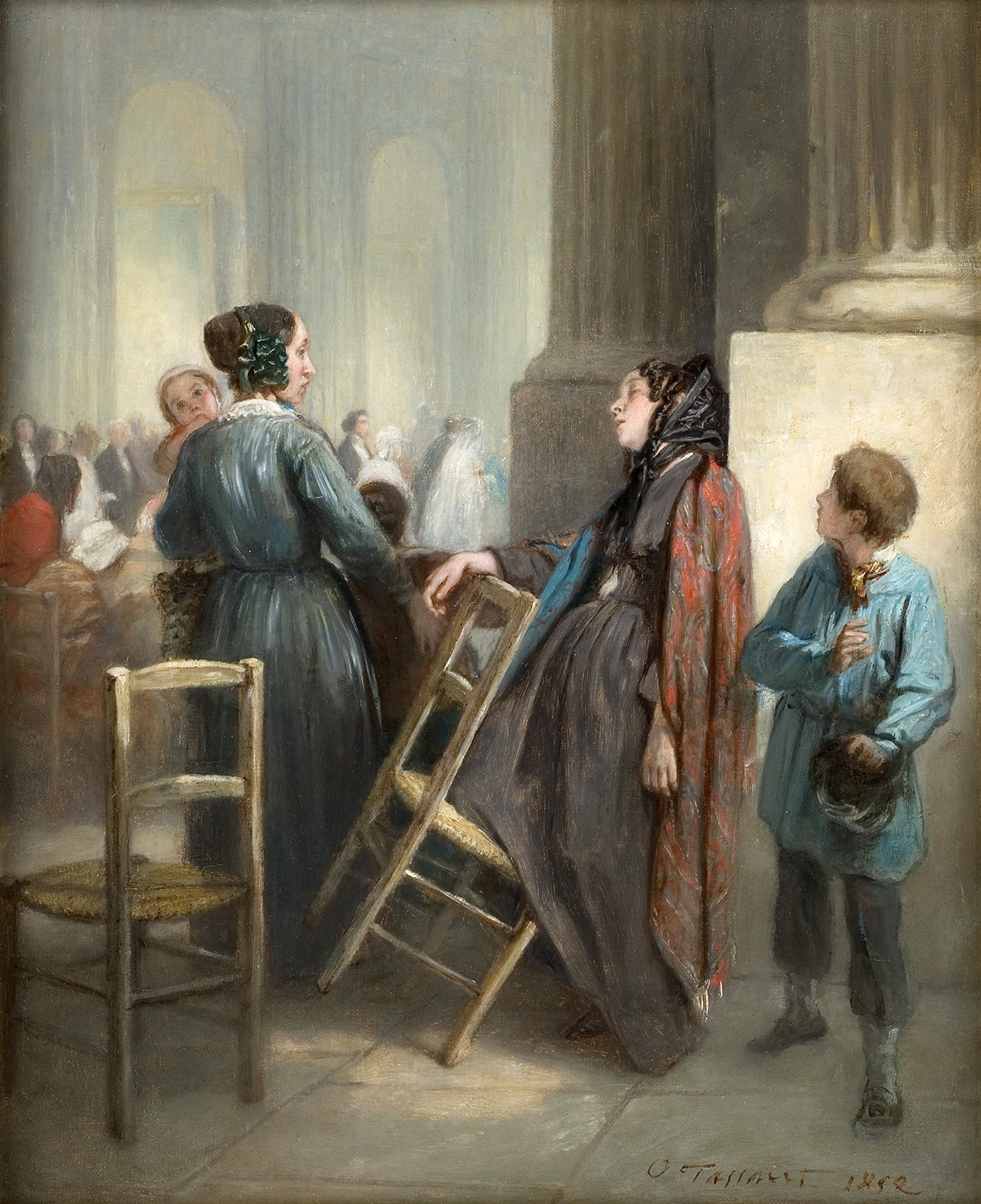
The Deserted Wife, Octave Tassaert, 1852

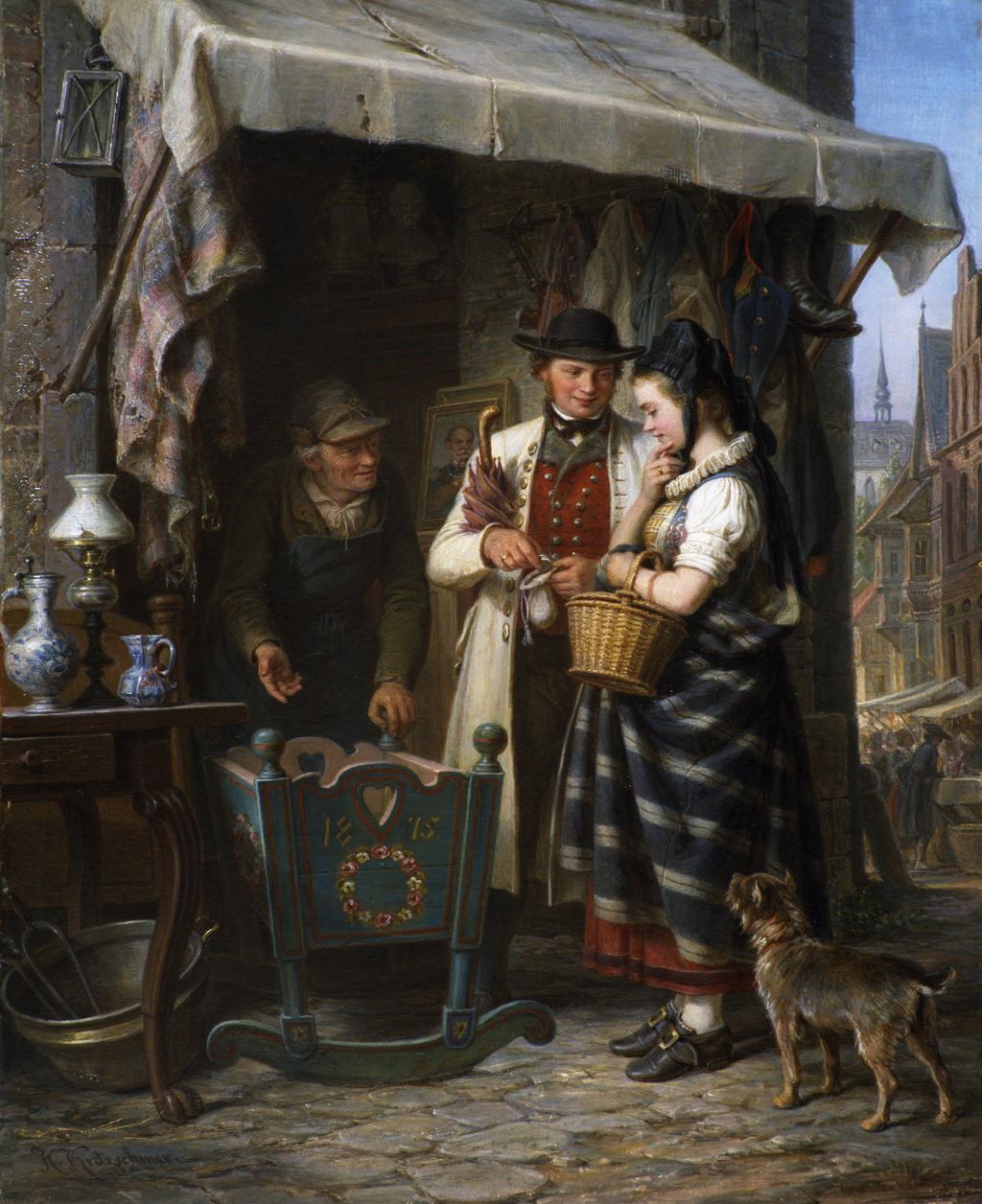
Buying a cradle; Hermann Kretzschmer, 1875

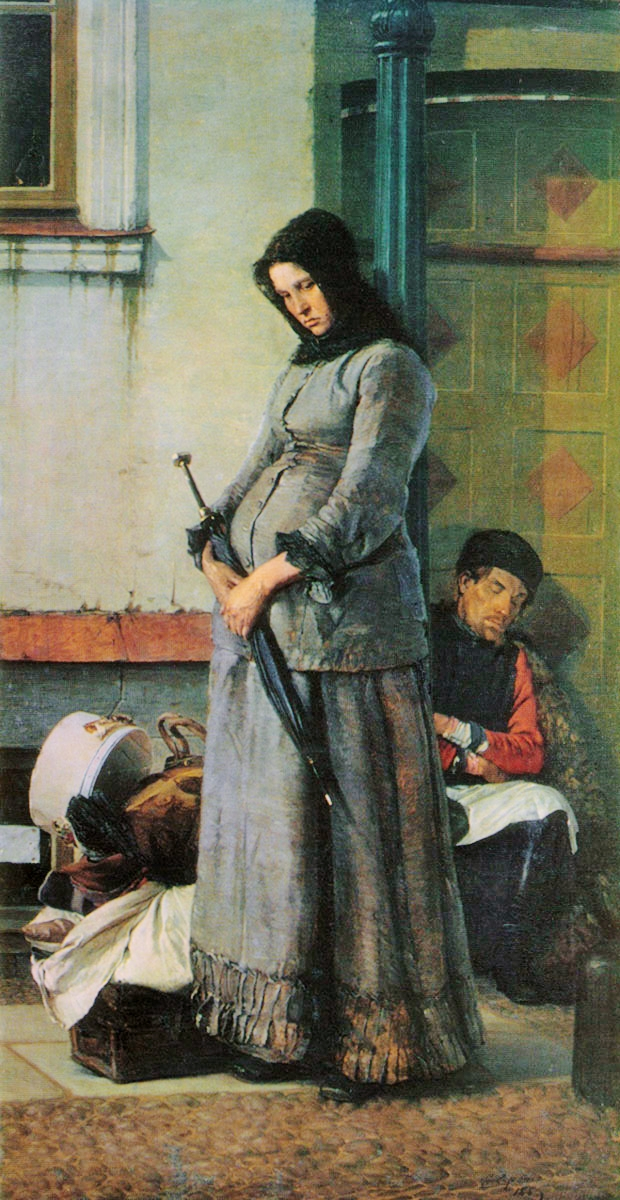
Nikolai Yaroshenko, 1883

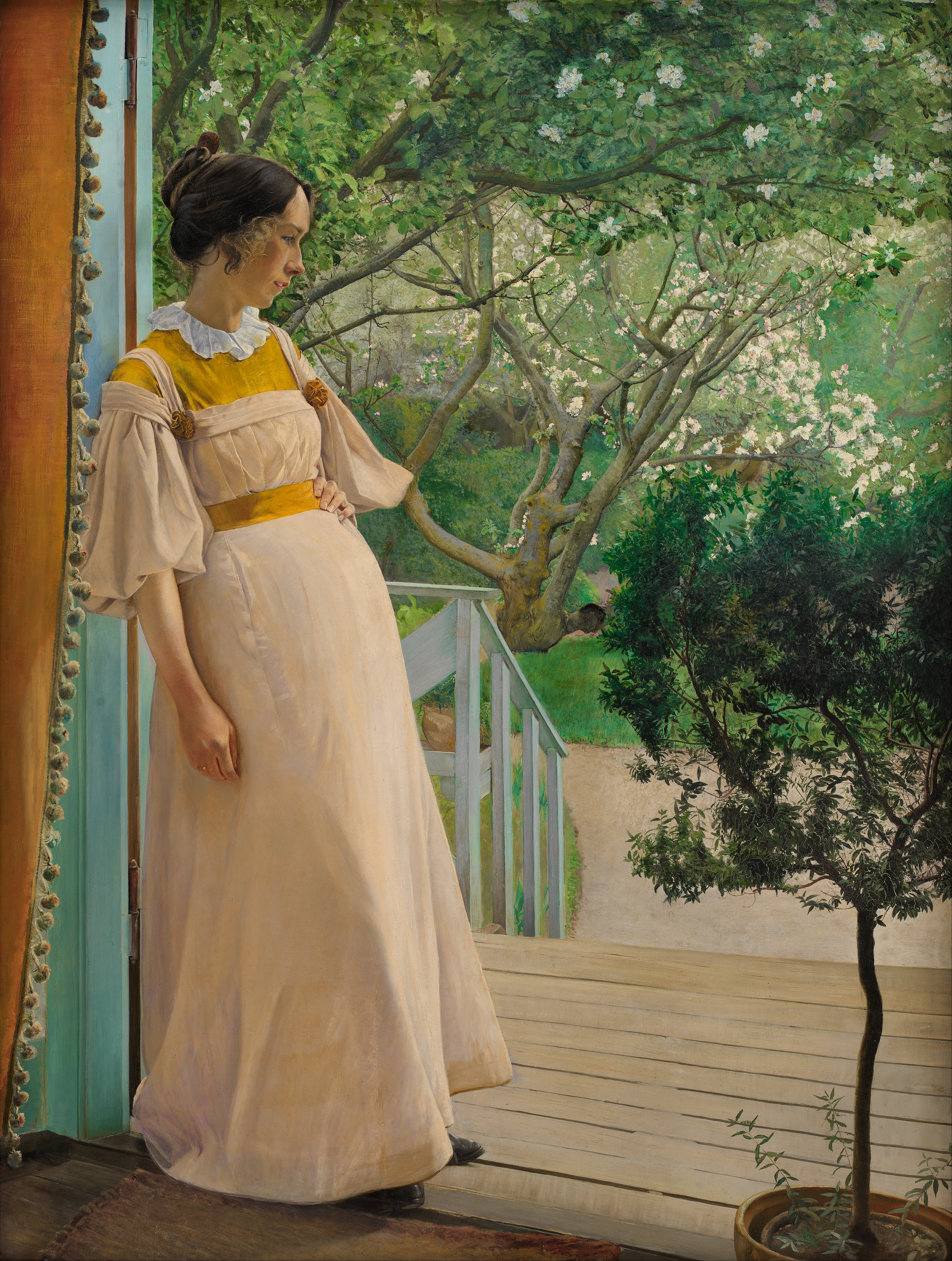
L.A. Ring, At the French Windows; The Artist's Wife, 1897

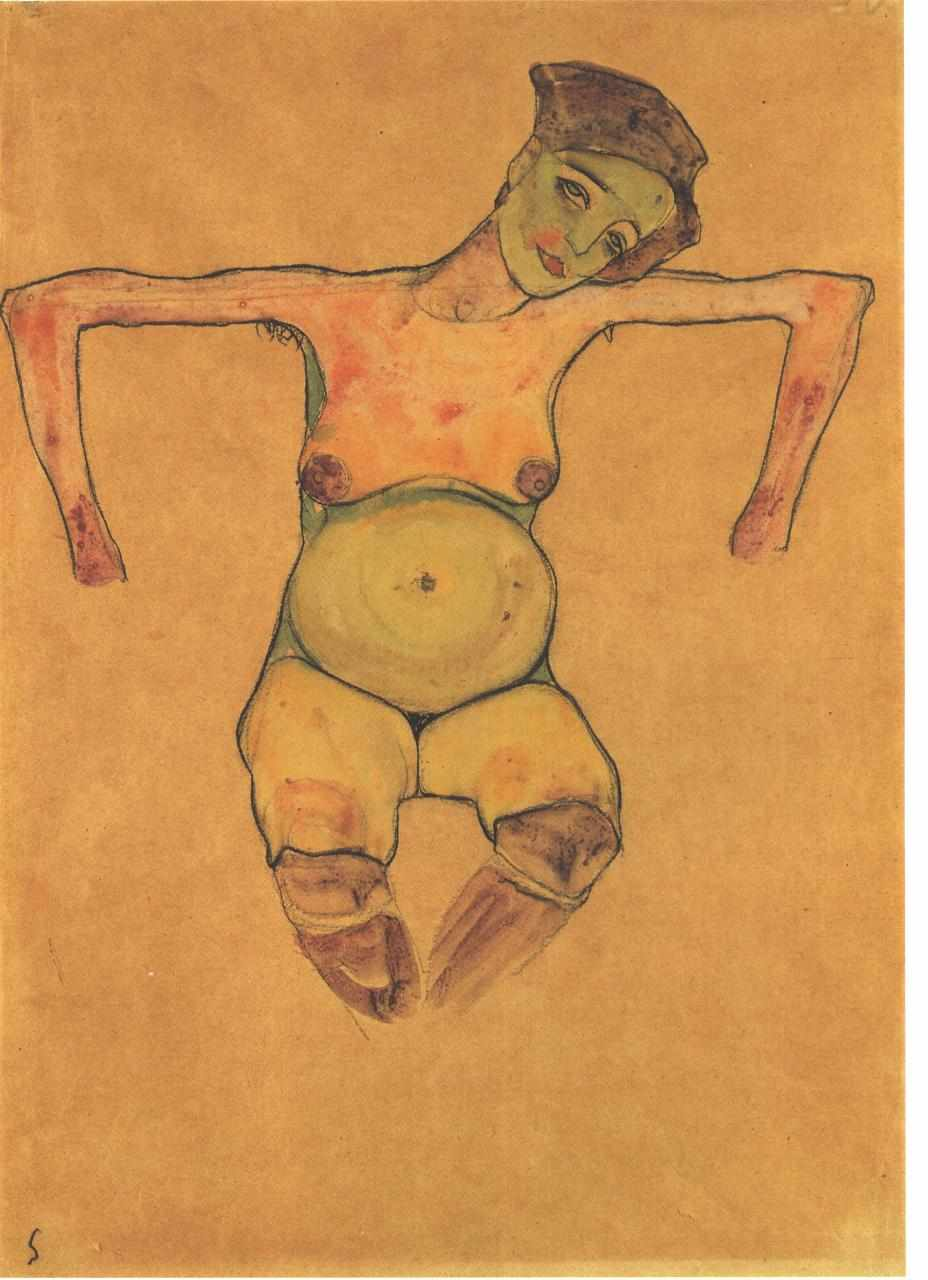
Pregnant Woman, Egon Schiele

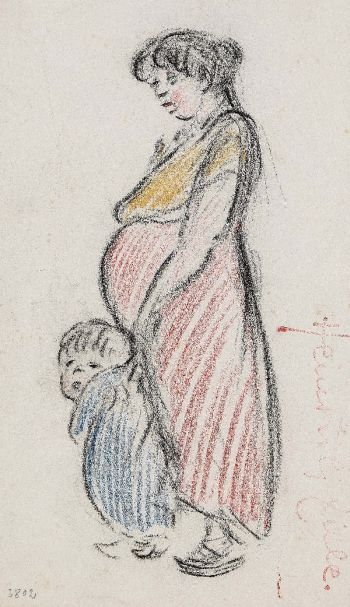
Heinrich Zille (d 1929)

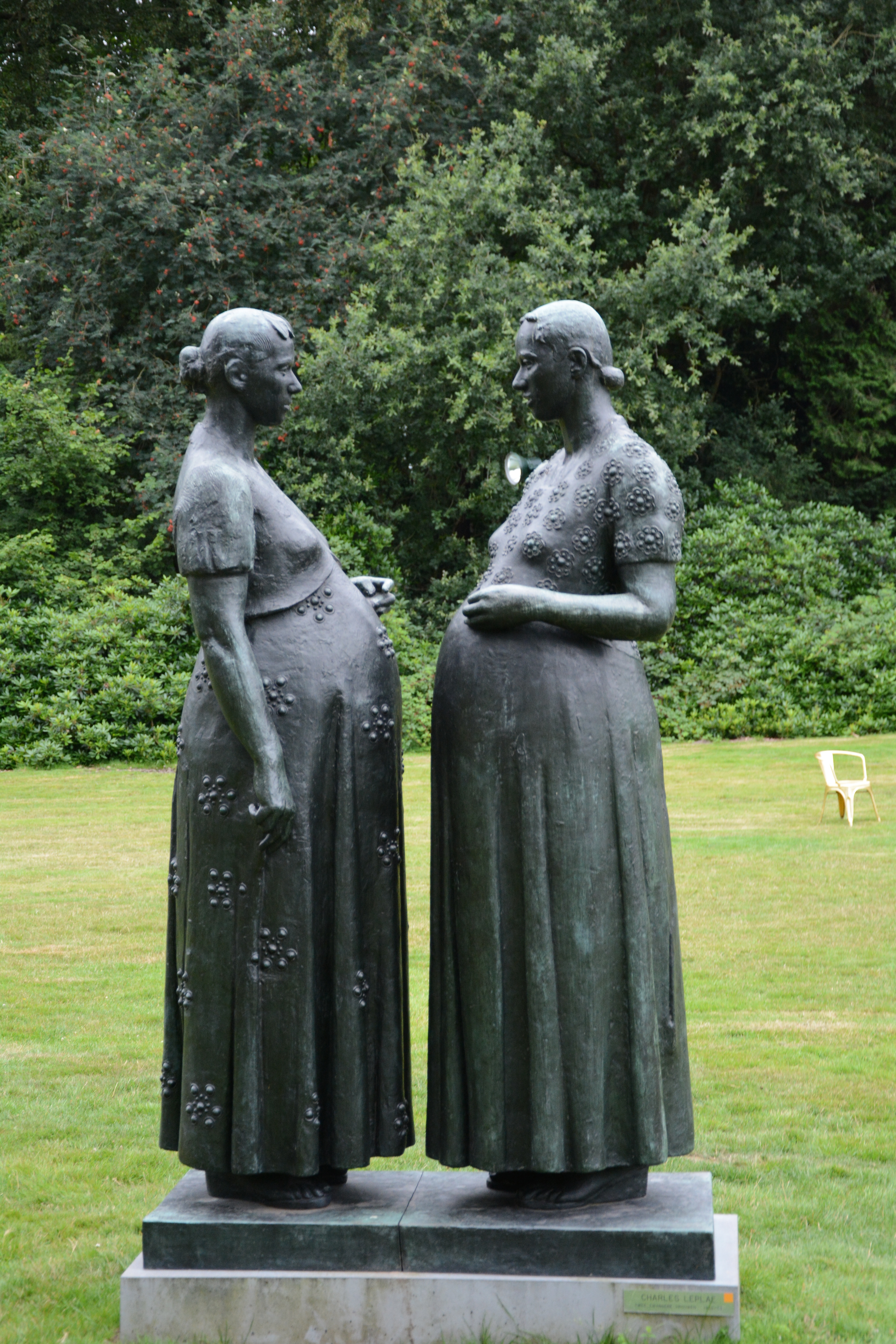
Two pregnant women, by the Belgian sculptor, Charles Leplae, 1952-1953
