= Merry England =

Idealistic vision of a lost English way of life

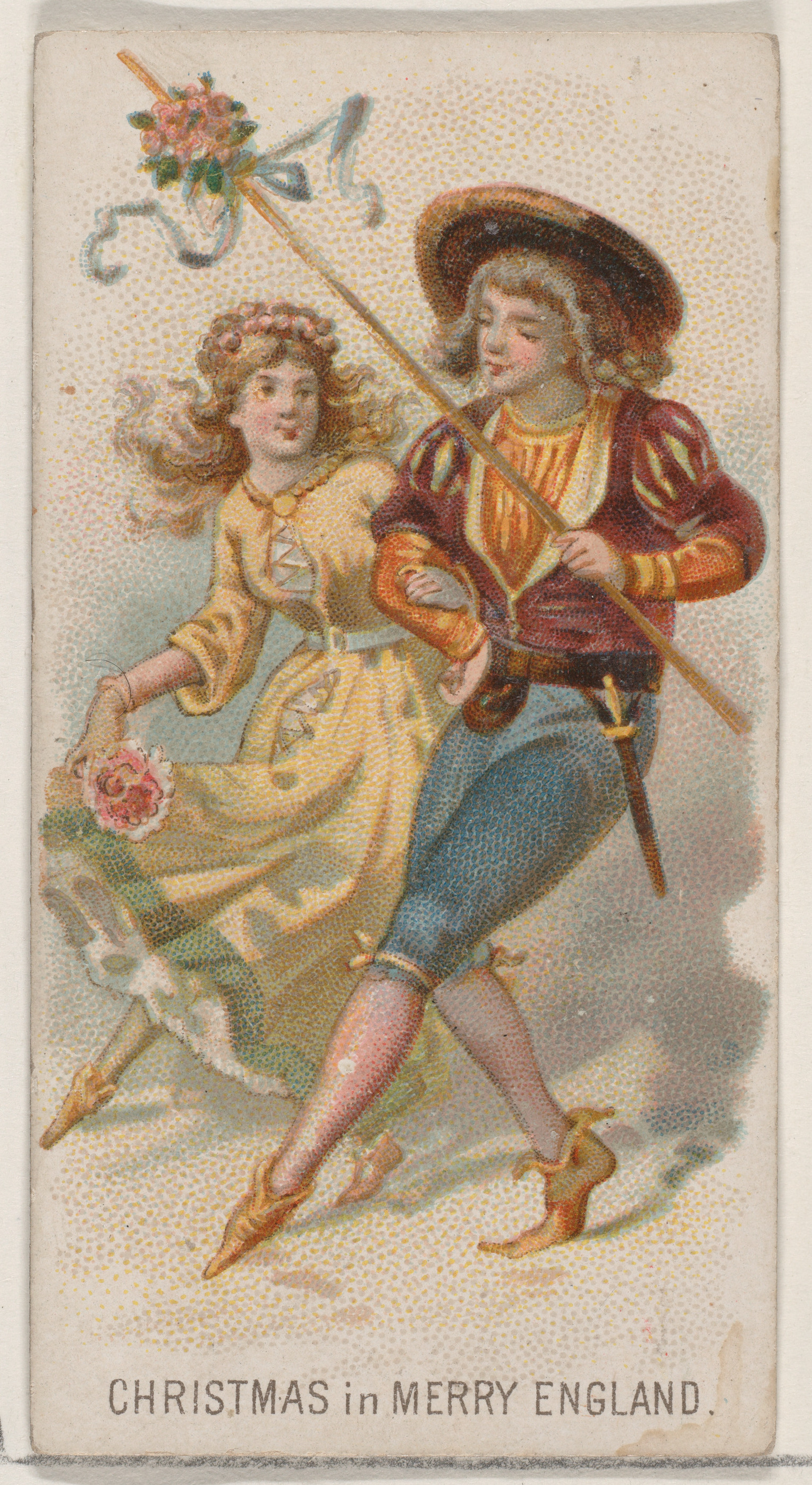
"Christmas in Merry England", an 1890 cigarette card

"Merry England", or in more jocular, archaic spelling "Merrie England", refers to a utopian conception of English society and culture based on an idyllic pastoral way of life that was allegedly prevalent in early modern Britain at some time between the Middle Ages and the onset of the Industrial Revolution. More broadly, it connotes a putative essential Englishness with nostalgic overtones, incorporating such cultural symbols as the thatched cottage, the country inn and the Sunday roast.

Folklorist Roy Judge has described the concept as "a world that has never actually existed, a visionary, mythical landscape, where it is difficult to take normal historical bearings." It may be treated both as a product of the sentimental nostalgic imagination and as an ideological or political construct, often underwriting various sorts of conservative world-views. Favourable perceptions of Merry England reveal a nostalgia for aspects of an earlier society that are missing in modern times.

== Medieval origins ==
The concept of Merry England originated in the Middle Ages, when Henry of Huntingdon around 1150 first coined the phrase Anglia plena jocis. His theme was taken up in the following century by the encyclopedist Bartholomeus Anglicus, who claimed that "England is full of mirth and of game, and men oft-times able to mirth and game".

However Ronald Hutton's study of churchwardens' accounts places the real consolidation of "Merry England" between 1350 and 1520, with the newly elaborative annual festive round of the liturgical year, with candles and pageants, processions and games, boy bishops and decorated rood lofts. Hutton argues that many of the activities of popular piety criticised by 16th-century reformers were far from being holdovers from the era of paganism but were instead creations of the later Middle Ages. Hutton argues that "Merry England" thus reflects those historical aspects of rural English customs and folklore that were subsequently lost.

The same concept may have been used to describe a utopian state of life that peasants aspired to lead (see Cockaigne). Peasant revolts, such as those led by Wat Tyler and Jack Straw, invoked a visionary idea that was also egalitarian – John Ball arguing for "wines, spices, and good bread ... velvet and camlet furred with grise" all to be held in common. Tyler's rebels wished to throw off the feudal aristocracy (though the term "Norman yoke" belongs to a later period) and return to a perceived time where the Saxons ruled in equality and freedom. The main arguments of Tyler's rebels were that there was no basis for aristocratic rule in the Bible, and that the Plague had demonstrated by its indiscriminate nature that all people were equal under God.

Even in relatively peaceful times, medieval existence was for the majority a harsh and uncertain one – Lawrence Stone describing rural life as "at the mercy of disease and the weather ... with money to burn today from the sale of a bumper crop, plunged into debt tomorrow because of harvest failure". Nevertheless, the rural community was clearly prepared to play hard as well as work hard (even if much of the surviving evidence for this comes in the form of official censure, ecclesiastical or secular). The festival calendar provided some 50 holy days for seasonal and communal coming-together and merry-making. Complaints against the rise in levels of drunkenness and crime on holidays, of flirting in church or on pilgrimage, of grievous bodily harm from the "abominable enough ... foot-ball-game" all testify (however indirectly) to a vital, if unofficial medieval existence. The 14th-century English poet Langland might castigate, but he also provides a vivid picture of those who "drink all day in diverse taverns, and gossip and joke there", of the field-workers who "sat down to drink their ale and sing songs – thinking to plough his field with a 'Hey-nonny-nonny'". The wandering scholar, or goliard, who posed the mock questions of whether it was better to eat meat or fish, to court Agnes or Rose, belonged to a similar fraternity.

More legitimised recreation came in the form of archery, ice-skating, wrestling, hunting and hawking, while there was also the medieval angler, of whom Juliana Berners wrote: "atte the leest hath his holsom walke and mery at his ease". Towns had nomadic entertainers—minstrels, jugglers, mummers, morris-dancers, actors and jig-makers— all adding to first stirrings of mass entertainment.

Thus there was certainly merriment in medieval England, even if found in an unidealised and conflictual social setting. If there was a period after the Black Death when labour shortages meant that agricultural workers were in stronger positions, and serfdom was consequently eroded, the growing commercialisation of agriculture – with enclosures, rising rents, and pasture displacing arable, and sheep displacing men – meant that such social and economic hardship and conflict continued in the countryside through into Tudor times.

== Post-Reformation conflicts ==
The Reformation set in motion a debate about popular festivities that was to endure for at least a century-and-a-half – a culture war concerning the so-called politics of mirth. As part of the move away from Catholicism, Henry VIII had slashed the number of saint day holidays, attacking the "lycencyous vacacyon and lybertye of these holy days", and Edward VI had reduced them further to 27. The annual festal round in parish society, consolidated between 1350 and 1520 (Note: See: Hutton (1994). Chapter 2: "The Making of Merry England". For methodological criticism, see French (1995).) and including such customs as church ales, May games, maypoles and local plays, came under severe pressure in Elizabethan England. Religious austerity, opposed to Catholic and pagan hangovers, and economic arguments against idleness, found common ground in attacking communal celebrations.

However, a reaction quickly set in, John Caius in 1552 deploring the loss of what he called "the old world, when this country was called merry England". James I in 1618 issued his Book of Sports, specifically defending the practice of sports, dancing, maypoles and the like after Sunday Service; and his son Charles I took a similar line. The question of "Merry England" thus became a focal point dividing Puritan and Anglican, proto-Royalist and proto-Roundhead, in the lead-up to the Civil War. Unsurprisingly, the Long Parliament put an end to parish ales, the last of which was held in 1641, and drove Christmas underground, where it was kept privately as a form of protest; while the Restoration saw the revival of such pastimes (if not on the Sabbath itself) widely and popularly celebrated.

== Cultural revivals ==
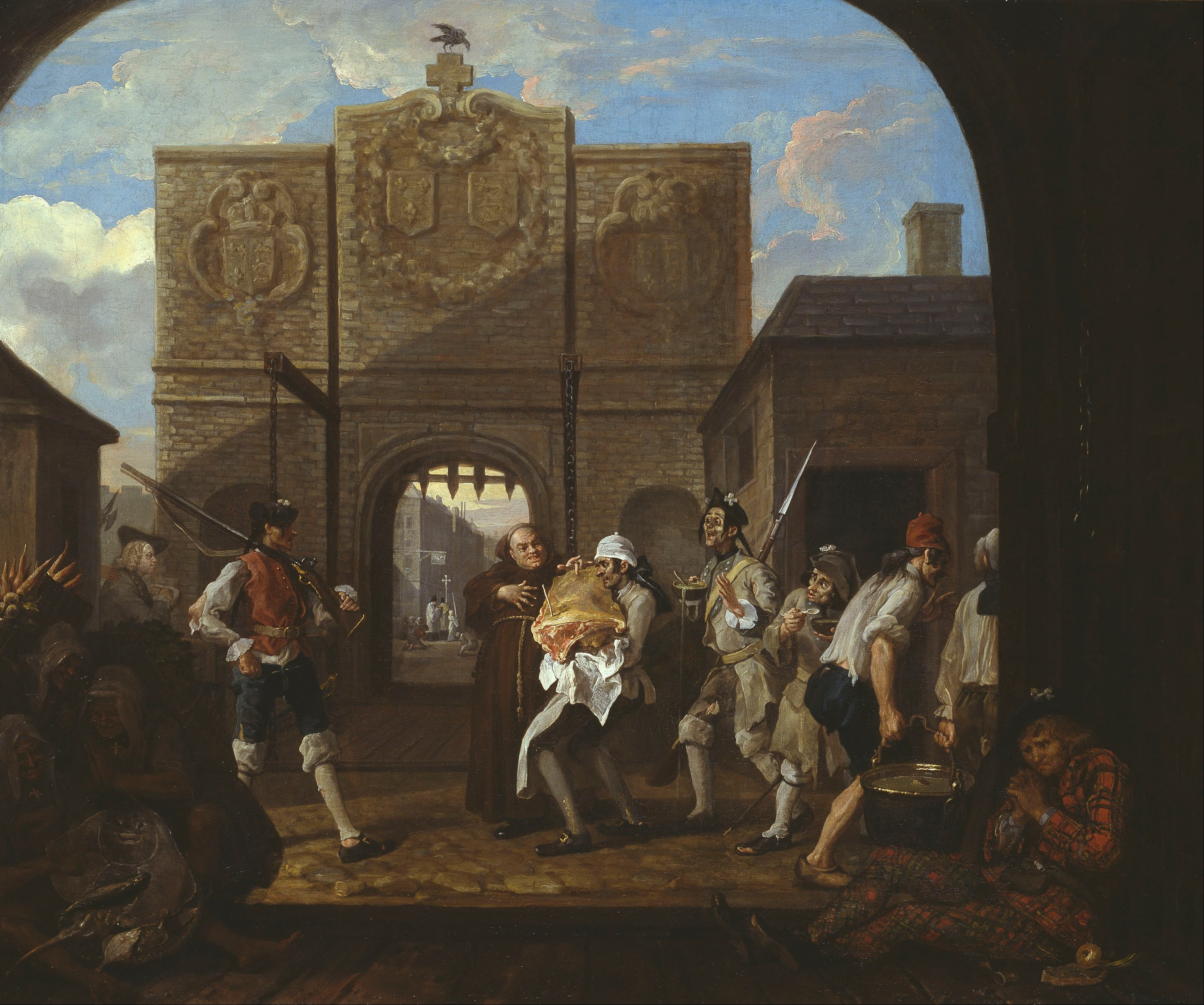
O the Roast Beef of Old England (The Gate of Calais) by William Hogarth contrasts English plenty with French and Jacobite Highlander misery.

At various times since the Middle Ages, authors, propagandists, romanticists, poets and others have revived or co-opted the term. The celebrated William Hogarth engraving illustrating the patriotic song "The Roast Beef of Old England", is as anti-French as it is patriotic. William Hazlitt's essay "Merry England", appended to his Lectures on the English Comic Writers (1819), (Note: It was often reprinted in collections of Hazlitt's essays, and, tellingly, included in Ernest Rhys' compilation of sentimental patriotism The Old Country: a Book of Love and Praise of England, first published in 1917, as the First World War was coming to an end, and republished in 1922.) popularised the specific term, introduced in tandem with an allusion to the iconic figure of Robin Hood, under the epigraph "St George for merry England!":

The beams of the morning sun shining on the lonely glades, or through the idle branches of the tangled forest, the leisure, the freedom, 'the pleasure of going and coming without knowing where', the troops of wild deer, the sports of the chase, and other rustic gambols, were sufficient to justify the appelation of 'Merry Sherwood', and in like manner, we may apply the phrase to Merry England.

Hazlitt's subject was the traditional sports and rural diversions native to the English. In Die Lage der arbeitenden Klasse in England (1844: translated as The Condition of the Working Class in England), Friedrich Engels wrote sarcastically of Young England (a ginger-group of young aristocrats hostile to the new industrial order) that they hoped to restore "the old 'merry England' with its brilliant features and its romantic feudalism. This object is of course unattainable and ridiculous ..." The phrase merry England appears in English in the German text.

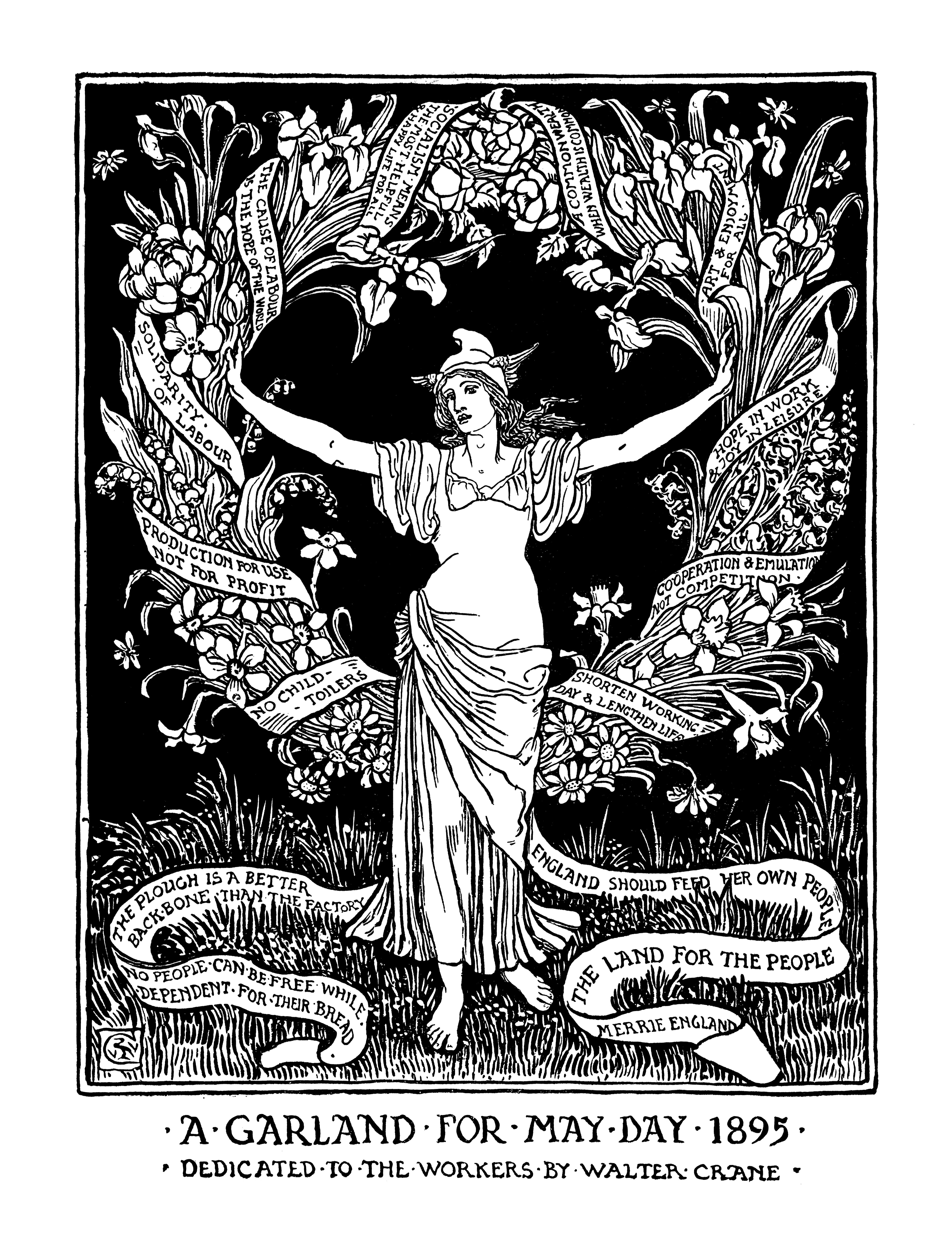
"A Garland for May Day 1895" woodcut by Walter Crane

William Cobbett provides conservative commentary on the rapidly changing look and mores of an industrialising nation by invoking the stable social hierarchy and prosperous working class of the pre-industrial country of his youth in his Rural Rides (1822–26, collected in book form, 1830). The later works of Samuel Taylor Coleridge also subscribe to some extent to the "Merry England" view. Thomas Carlyle's Past and Present also makes the case for Merrie England; the conclusion of Crotchet Castle by Thomas Love Peacock contrasts the mediaevalism of Mr. Chainmail to the contemporary social unrest. Barry Cornwall's patriotic poem "Hurrah for Merry England" was set twice to music and printed in The Musical Times, in 1861 and 1880.

In the 1830s, the Gothic Revival promoted in England what once had been a truly international European style. Its stages, though, had been given purely English antiquarian labels – "Norman" for the Romanesque, and "Early English", for example – and the revival was stretched to include also the succeeding, more specifically English style: a generic English Renaissance revival, later named "Jacobethan". The revival was spurred by a series of lithographs by Joseph Nash (1839–1849), illustrating The Mansions of England in the Olden Time in picturesque and accurate detail. They were peopled with jolly figures in ruffs and farthingales, who personified a specific "Merry England" that was not Catholic (always an issue with the Gothic style in England), yet full of lively detail, in a golden pre-industrial land of Cockaigne.

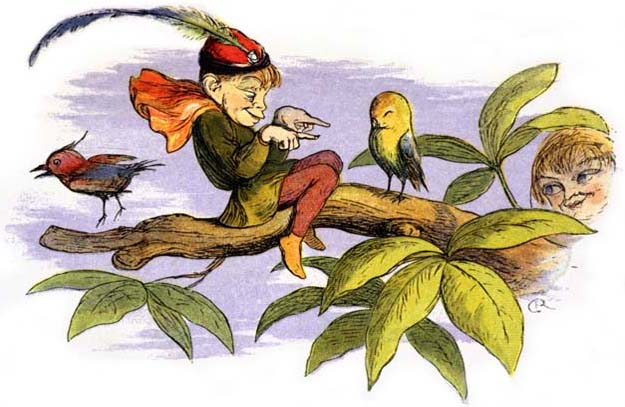
Poor little birdie teased, by the 19th-century English illustrator Richard Doyle. Traditional English fairytales depicting elves, fairies and pixies are set on a "Merrie England" setting of woodland and cottage gardens.

Children's storybooks and fairytales written in the Victorian period often use Merry England as a setting as it is seen as a mythical utopia. They often contain nature-loving mythological creatures such as elves and fairies, as well as Robin Hood.

The London-based Anglo-Catholic magazine of prose and verse Merry England began publication in 1879. Its issues bore a sonnet by William Wordsworth as epigraph, beginning "They called thee 'merry England' in old time" and characterising Merry England "a responsive chime to the heart's fond belief":

...Can, I ask,
This face of rural beauty be a mask
For discontent, and poverty, and crime?—
These spreading towns a cloak for lawless will?—
Forbid it, Heaven! —that Merry England still
May be thy rightful name, in prose or rhyme.

In the late Victorian era, the Tory Young England set perhaps best reflected the vision of "Merry England" on the political stage. Today, in a form adapted to political conservatism, the vision of "Merry England" extends to embrace a few urban artisans and other cosmopolitans; a flexible and humane clergy; an interested and altruistic squirearchy, aristocracy and royalty. Solidity and good cheer would be the values of yeoman farmers, whatever the foibles of those higher in the hierarchy.

The idea of Merry England became associated on one side with the Anglo-Catholics and Catholicism, as a version of life's generosity; for example Wilfred and Alice Meynell entitled one of their magazines Merrie England. The pastoral aspects of William Blake, a Londoner and an actual craftsman, lack the same mellow quality. G. K. Chesterton in part adapted it to urban conditions. William Morris and the Arts and Crafts movement and other left-inclined improvers (whom Sir Hugh Casson called "the herbivores") were also (partly) believers. Walter Crane's "Garland for May Day 1895" is lettered "Merrie England" together with progressive slogans ("Shorten Working Day & Lengthen Life", "The Land for the People", "No Child Toilers") with socialism ("Production for Use Not for Profit"). For a time, the Merry England vision was a common reference point for rhetorical Tories and utopian socialists, offering similar alternatives to an industrialising society, with its large-scale movement off the land to jerry-built cities and gross social inequality.

This was also the theme of journalist Robert Blatchford, editor of the Clarion, in his booklet Merrie England (1893). In it he imagined a new society much on the basis of Morris's News from Nowhere, in which capitalism had disappeared and people lived in small self-sufficient communities. The book was deeply nostalgic for a pastoral England of the past before industrial capitalism and factory production. It was widely read and enjoyed worldwide sales and probably introduced more working-class readers to socialism than Morris or Karl Marx.

Another variant of Merry England was promoted in the organic community of F. R. Leavis by which he seems to have meant a community with a deeply rooted and locally self-sufficient culture. In his view, such communities existed in the villages of 17th and 18th century England and were destroyed by the machine and mass culture introduced by the Industrial Revolution. Historians of the era say that the idea was based on a misreading of history and that such communities had never existed.

Punch in 1951 mocked both planning and the concept of a revived Merry England, by envisioning a 'Merrie Board' with powers to set up 'Merrie Areas' in rural England – intended to preserve "this hard core of Merriment".

== Deep England ==
"Deep England" refers to an idealised view of a rural southern England. The term is often used to describe what English cultural conservatives would wish to conserve and is used by both supporters and critics of the concept. The term, which alludes to la France profonde, has been attributed to both Patrick Wright and Angus Calder. The concept of Deep England may imply an explicit opposition to modernism and industrialisation; and may be connected to a ruralist viewpoint typified by writer H. J. Massingham. Major artists whose work is associated with Deep England include: writer Thomas Hardy, painter John Constable, composer Ralph Vaughan Williams, and poets Rupert Brooke and Sir John Betjeman. Examples of this conservative or village green viewpoint include the ideological outlook of magazines such as This England. Wartime propaganda is sometimes taken to reflect a generalised view of a rural Deep England, but this is perhaps to ignore both the competing views of ruralism, and the mix of rural and non-rural actually offered for a post-war vision of a better Britain.

== Little England and propaganda ==
In Angus Calder's re-examination of the ideological constructs surrounding "Little England" during the Second World War in The Myth of the Blitz, he puts forward the view that the story of Deep England was central to wartime propaganda operations within the United Kingdom, and then, as now, served a clearly defined political and cultural purpose in the hands of various interested agencies.

Calder cites the writer and broadcaster J. B. Priestley whom he considers to be a proponent of the Deep England world-view. Priestley's wartime BBC radio "chats" describe the beauty of the English natural environment, this at a time when rationing was at its height, and the population of London was sheltering from The Blitz in its Underground stations. In reference to one of Priestley's bucolic broadcasts, Calder makes the following point:

Priestley, the socialist, gives this cottage no occupant, nor does he wonder about the size of the occupant's wage, nor ask if the cottage has internal sanitation and running water. His countryside only exists as spectacle, for the delectation of people with motor cars." (Angus Calder, The Myth of the Blitz, London 1991)

However, in Journey Through England, Priestley identifies himself as a Little Englander because he despises imperialism and the effect that the capitalist Industrial Revolution had on the people and environment.

Part of the imagery of the 1940 patriotic song "There'll Always Be an England" seems to be derived from the same source:

There'll always be an England
While there's a country lane,
Wherever there's a cottage small
Beside a field of grain.

The continuation evokes, however, the opposite image of the modern industrialised society:

There'll always be an England
While there's a busy street,
Wherever there's a turning wheel,
A million marching feet.

The song seems therefore to offer a synthesis and combine the two Englands, the archaic bucolic one and the modern industrialised one, in the focus of patriotic loyalty and veneration.

== Literature and the arts ==
The transition from a literary locus of Merry England to a more obviously political one cannot be placed before 1945, as the cited example of J. B. Priestley shows. Writers and artists described as having a Merry England viewpoint range from the radical visionary poet William Blake to the evangelical Christian Arthur Mee. The Rudyard Kipling of Puck of Pook's Hill is certainly one; when he wrote it, he was in transition towards his later, very conservative stance. Within art, the fabled long-lost merrie England was also a recurring theme in the Victorian-era paintings of the Pre-Raphaelite Brotherhood. The 1890 News from Nowhere by William Morris portrays a future England that has reverted to a rural idyll following a socialist revolution.

Reference points might be taken as children's writer Beatrix Potter, John Betjeman (more interested in Victoriana), and the fantasy author J. R. R. Tolkien, whose hobbit characters' culture in The Shire embodied many aspects of the Merry England point of view.

In his essay "Epic Pooh", Michael Moorcock opines:

The little hills and woods of that Surrey of the mind, the Shire, are 'safe', but the wild landscapes everywhere beyond the Shire are 'dangerous'. Experience of life itself is dangerous. The Lord of the Rings is a pernicious confirmation of the values of a declining nation with a morally bankrupt class whose cowardly self-protection is primarily responsible for the problems England answered with the ruthless logic of Thatcherism. Humanity was derided and marginalised. Sentimentality became the acceptable substitute. So few people seem to be able to tell the difference.

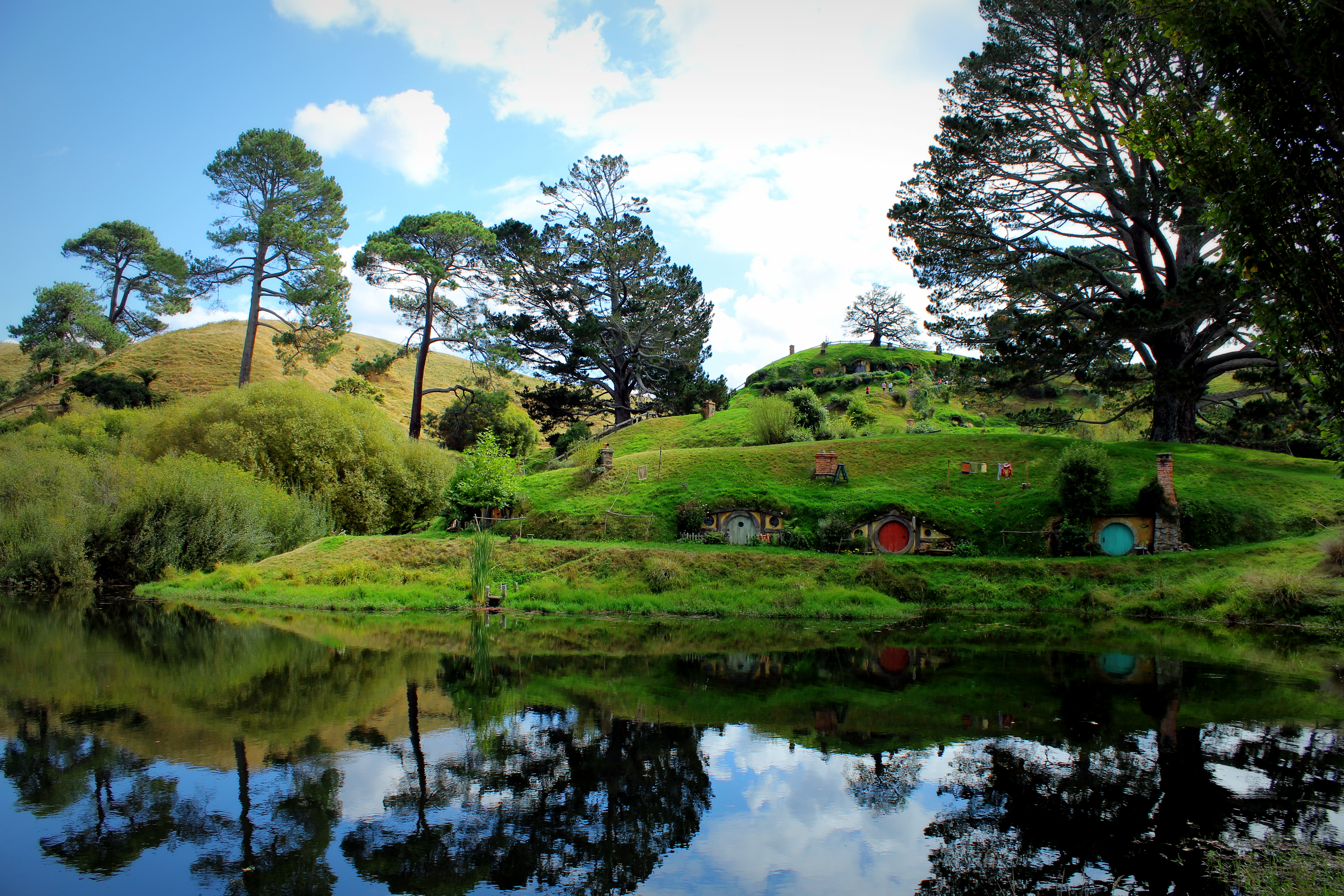
Part of the Shire created for The Lord of the Rings films

The Pyrates, the 1983 spoof historical novel by George MacDonald Fraser, sets its scene with a page-long sentence composed entirely of (immediately demolished) Merry England tropes:

It began in the old and golden days of England, in a time when all the hedgerows were green and the roads dusty, when hawthorn and wild roses bloomed, when big-bellied landlords brewed October ale at a penny a pint ...

The novel England, England by Julian Barnes describes an imaginary, though plausible, set of circumstances that cause modern England to return to the state of Deep England. The author's views are not made explicit, but the characters who choose to remain in the changed nation are treated more sympathetically than those who leave. In Kingsley Amis's novel Lucky Jim, Professor Welch and his friends are devotees of the Merry England legend, and Jim's "Merrie England" lecture somehow turns into a debunking of the whole concept (a position almost certainly reflecting that of Amis). Richmal Crompton's William the Bad [1930] contains a chapter, "The Pennymans Hand On The Torch", about an idealist couple who wish to return to Merrie England, as a staging post towards their ideal of living at "the morning of the world", which means dressing in flowing robes and (incongruously with the Merrie England concept, bearing in mind the traditions of English Ale and The Roast Beef of Old England) being vegetarian and teetotal. The pageant they organise becomes a fiasco, largely, needless to say, on account of William's involvement as part of the dragon who fights Mr Pennyman's St George. "The Pennymans'... pageant for May Day which involves St George and the Dragon ... proves to be the first time ever that the Dragon (played by William) ever came out on top in the conflict".

== Music ==
Eric Saylor traces Arcadian antecedents in English pastoral music back to 18th century works such as Handel's Acis and Galatea (1718, text by John Gay), which remained a mainstay of English choral festivals throughout the 19th century. Arthur Sullivan's Iolanthe (1882) makes use of pastoral conventions. His ballet Victoria and Merrie England, produced for the diamond jubilee of Queen Victoria in 1897, consists of a series of scenes depicting idealised versions of British mythology and past eras typical of Merry England, including a country village celebrating May Day in Elizabethan times and Christmas during the Restoration. The final scenes are recreations of Victoria's coronation and a celebration of the British Empire, tying the contemporary world of 1897 back to the popular idealised world of Merry England. Sullivan's score consists of original music mixed with a large number of popular and historical folk tunes, traditional songs and national anthems. The ballet was very popular, running continuously for nearly six months.

Merrie England, a comic opera by Edward German, also became a great success in 1902, and over the following century was so frequently produced by amateur groups in England that it has probably been performed more often than any other British opera or operetta written in the 20th century. During his heyday, German successfully tapped into and fostered a new enthusiasm for British music in the context of a romanticised Shakespearian or semi mythical "Merrie England". His Three Dances from 'Henry VIII' (1892) was easily the most frequently performed English orchestral work in the first decade of the BBC Proms, with well over 30 performances between 1895 and 1905. Three Dances from 'As You Like It' (1896) was similarly popular.

Other composers, such as Charles Villiers Stanford (Suite of Ancient Dances, 1895), Frederick Cowen (Four English Dances in the Old Style, 1896), Norman O'Neill (overture to Hamlet, 1904) and Percy Pitt (Three Old English Dances, 1904) turned to similar sources for inspiration.

A few popular music artists have used elements of the Merry England story as recurring themes. The Kinks and their leader Ray Davies crafted The Kinks are the Village Green Preservation Society in 1968 as a homage to English country life and culture: it was described by AllMusic senior editor Stephen Thomas Erlewine as an album "lamenting the passing of old-fashioned English traditions". Their 1969 album Arthur (Or the Decline and Fall of the British Empire) also contains similar elements. Ian Anderson of Jethro Tull has often alluded to an anti-modern, pre-industrial, agrarian vision of England in his songs (the band's namesake was himself an agrarian, the inventor of the seed drill).

== See also ==
- And did those feet in ancient time
- Arcadia
- Civil religion
- C. S. Lewis
- Middle England
- Pastoral
- Robert Herrick
- Sabbatarianism
- Tudor myth
- Whig history
