= The Grub Street Opera =

Play by Henry Fielding

The Grub Street Opera is a play by Henry Fielding that originated as an expanded version of his play The Welsh Opera. It was never put on for an audience and is Fielding's single print-only play. As in The Welsh Opera, the author of the play is identified as Scriblerus Secundus. Secundus also appears in the play and speaks of his role in composing the plays. In The Grub Street Opera the main storyline involves two men and their rival pursuit of women.

The play is Fielding's first truly political play and first ballad opera. Unlike The Welsh Opera, the play deals with morality from the beginning. Additionally, it linked to Fielding's previous attacks on the London theatre and inept writers. Fielding also used the virtue of female servants as a point of humour and to discuss morality, while using the effeminacy and dominance by women to mock various characters and discuss the issue of gender roles. Critics viewed The Grub Street Opera positively, noting it to be a definite improvement on The Welsh Opera.

== Background ==
Fielding created three theatrical versions of The Grub Street Opera. Of these, one was performed at a Haymarket theatre, but only in rehearsals. The play originates as an expanded version of The Welsh Opera. The revision had a puff piece in the 21 May 1731 Daily Post saying, "We hear that the Grubstreet Opera, written by Scriblerus Secundus, which was to have been postponed till next Season, will, at the particular Request of several Persons of Quality, be perform'd within a Fortnight, being now in Rehearsal at the New Theatre in the Hay-market."

Later, it was advertised again in the 5 June 1731 Daily Post as being rehearsed, but the 11 June edition stated that one of the performers was sick and the 14 June edition said that the play would be postponed indefinitely. It was never produced, and The Grub-Street Opera is the only play by Fielding that existed only as a printed play. It is unknown as to why the play was never put on for an audience, but it is possible that it was not performed because Fielding was either legally prevented to perform it by the British government or he was bribed to not perform it. John Henley, a defender of Robert Walpole and Walpole's government, discussed the incident in his poem "Hay-Market Actors of the design'd Grub-street Opera" (published in the 8–15 June 1731 edition of his newspaper, Hyp-Doctor). In it, he gloated over the play being kept from performance and stated that the government did not accept the play. He followed this in the 15–22 June edition with an attack upon Fielding.

Like E. Rayner's printing of The Welsh Opera, Rayner printed The Genuine Grub-Street Opera without Fielding's knowledge in August 1731. The print edition was based on the second script. Fielding responded with claims of piracy and was upset that his satirical attack, primarily upon Walpole's administration, became public knowledge. Fielding eventually printed his own version of the play, dated 1731. However, it is possible that it was not actually printed until June 1755, shortly after Fielding's death, by his friend Andrew Millar. Regardless of the date, the connection of Fielding to the edition establishes this later version as the only authoritative edition.

== Cast ==
The cast, according to the printed version, is as follows:

- Sir Owen Apshinken – a gentleman of Wales, in love with tobacco. Played by Mr. Furnival.
- Master Owen Apshinken – his son, in love with woman kind. Played by Mr Stopler.
- Mr. Apshones – his tenant. Played by Mr. Wathan.
- Puzzletext – his chaplain, in love with women, tobacco, drink, and backgammon. Played by Mr. Reynolds.
- Robin – his butler, in love with Sweetissa. Played by Mr. Mullart.
- William – his coachman, enemy to Robin, in love with Susan. Played by Mr. Jones.
- John – his groom, in love with Margery. Played by Mr. Dove.
- Thomas – the gardener. Played by Mr. Hicks.
- Lady Apshinken – wife to sir Owen, a great housewife, governante to her husband, a zealous advocate for the church. Played by Mrs. Furnival.
- Molly Apshones – daughter to Mr. Apshones, a woman of strict virtue. Played by Miss Patty Vaughan.
- Sweetissa – waiting-woman, – Women of strict virtue, in love with – Robin. Played by Mrs. Nokes.
- Susan – cook, – Women of strict virtue, in love with – Will. Played by Mrs. Mullart.
- Margery – housemaid – Women of strict virtue, in love with – John. Played by Mrs. Lacy.
- Scriblerus – Introduces the play, not cast.

== Plot ==
In The Welsh Opera, Fielding incorporated his editorial persona, Scriblerus Secundus, as a figure to connect the play with its companion piece, The Tragedy of Tragedies. However, in The Grub Street Opera Fielding drops all connections with The Tragedy of Tragedies. Scriblerus does introduce the play, as in the original, but he describes the moral purpose that motivates the play instead of being a comical connection with another work. After revealing Fielding's design in the play, Scriblerus leaves the stage.

The play describes the Apshinken family and the pursuits in love of Owen and his butler, Robin. Owen pursues four women and Robin pursues only one. However, Robin is pursuing Sweetissa, whom Owen wishes to have for himself. To separate the two, Owen forges a letter which works until Robin's virtue proves his own devotion to Sweetissa. Although Robin lacks virtue in most regards, such as his stealing from his master, he is able to marry Sweetissa and, at the end of the play, Fielding breaks from his own tradition of comedic marriages by having Owen and Molly marry.

== Themes ==
The Grub Street Opera is the first truly political play and also Fielding's first ballad opera. As such it owes a lot to Fielding's model, John Gay's The Beggar's Opera. Unlike his other Scriblerus plays, Fielding's Scriblerus persona in The Grub-Street Opera is deeply connected to Gay instead of Gay's fellow members of the Scriblerus Club, Alexander Pope or Jonathan Swift. As in The Welsh Opera, this connection served as a means to put forth a general political view and deal with politics in a more critical way unlike any of Fielding's previous plays. The play is a political allegory that satirises Walpole's government and the British monarchy. However, the play does not pick a side but pokes fun at everyone. He also kept his personal political views out of the play.

Fielding hoped to remove any moral ambiguity found within The Beggar's Opera. Unlike The Welsh Opera, the rewrite deals with morality at the very beginning. Similarly, the play focuses on problems within the literary community; the title links the play with the Grub Street Journal, a periodical that satirised inept writers that frequent Grub Street. It also links the play with Fielding's previous attacks on the London theatre and inept writers. In particular, Fielding satirises bad imitations of Gay's The Beggar's Opera and those who do not understand what Gay's play was originally about especially in regards to its mockery of the Italian opera tradition.

The virtue of the female servants is a point of humour in the play. Traditionally, female servants were depicted in comedic works as those lacking virtue and sexually willing towards their masters. The constant discussion of virtue and the upholding of virtue on the part of the servants is used in juxtaposition of that tradition to amuse an audience. However, their discussion also serves as a means for Fielding to discuss morality in a manner similar to Daniel Defoe's use of Moll Flanders or Samuel Richardson's use of Pamela. Unlike those later novelists, Fielding incorporates the humorous juxtaposition to allow for a mixture of humour and truth. The issue of gender roles and the virtue of various characters is extended further within The Grub Street Opera to include the use of effeminacy and dominance by women to mock various characters. In particular, the way the men are dominated by their wives is made fun of and shown as problematic.

== Sources ==
Betrand Godgar believed that, in the play, "Fielding unambiguously jeered at politicians and court figures, reducing them to the level of a Welsh family with its domestic squabbles." Fielding transitioned from the Pulteney and Walpole feud (see discussion at The Welsh Opera -Sources) to parodying the royal family when he expanded The Welsh Opera into The Grub-Street Opera. Unlike the feud, the depiction of the royal family was risky, especially seeing as how Fielding had no direct knowledge of any actual actions taking place with the royal family. Instead, he based his knowledge on rumours.

As for specific characters, Sir Owen Apshinken represents George II of Great Britain, Lady Apshinken represents queen consort Caroline of Ansbach, and the Apshinken son represents Frederick, Prince of Wales. The help also represent individuals involved in politics, for example, the gardener, Thomas, represents Thomas Pelham-Holles, 1st Duke of Newcastle, their groom, John, represents John Hervey, 2nd Baron Hervey, the butler, Robin, represents Sir Robert Walpole, and the coachman, William, represents William Pulteney, 1st Earl of Bath. Although these depictions may have caused problems for Fielding, the Battestins believe that "Fielding's satire is fairly innocuous when compared to the egregious standard of scandal-mongering and vituperation current at the time. And – an important circumstance often overlooked – his satire is even-handed in roasting both parties alike."

== Response ==
Although the play was never performed, its revisions reflect how Fielding sought to cater to what the audiences saw was popular in the earlier version, The Welsh Opera, which included adding more songs. Although not performed on stage, the songs became popular on their own. This was especially true in the case of "The Roast Beef of Old England". Edgar Roberts, when examining the quality of the songs of the play, declared that "it is fair to say that The Grub-Street Opera is musically the most satisfactory of all the ballad operas written in the decade following The Beggar's Opera." Likewise, Robert Hume determined that The Grub-Street Opera was "one of the finest ballad operas of its time".

Other views focused on other aspects, including the possible topical statements; John Loftis argues that "this afterpiece in the form of ballad opera seems, in its rendering of Court gossip, to be a dramatization of Lord Hervey's Memoirs". Thomas Cleary wrote that the "Grub-Street Opera is a much better play than the two-act Welsh Opera. It is so much improved that the impossibility of staging it [...] must have infuriated Fielding. Thomas Lockwood believes that both The Welsh Opera and The Grub-Street Opera are characterized by a "spirit of fun" but are complicated by the 18th-century politics that gave them birth.

== See also ==
- The Roast Beef of Old England – song from the Grub Street Opera
- The Welsh Opera – a precursor to The Grub Street Opera, also by Fielding
- Scriblerus Club – an informal club of satirists
