= John Robert Cozens =

English watercolour painter (1752–1797)

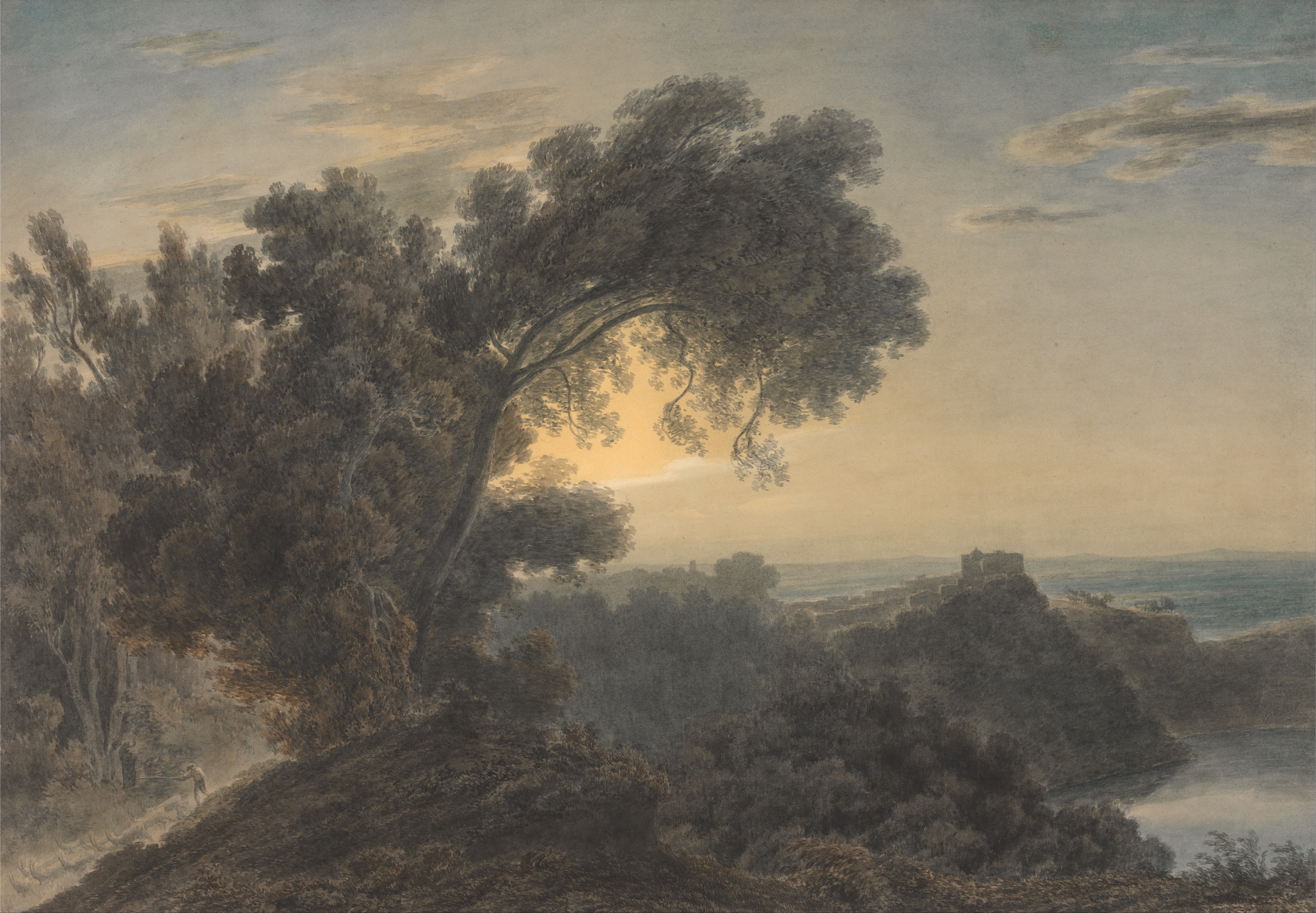
The Lake of Albano and Castle Gandolfo, Yale. Compare the very similar version in the Tate,, and another at the Whitworth. In all, there are 11 versions.

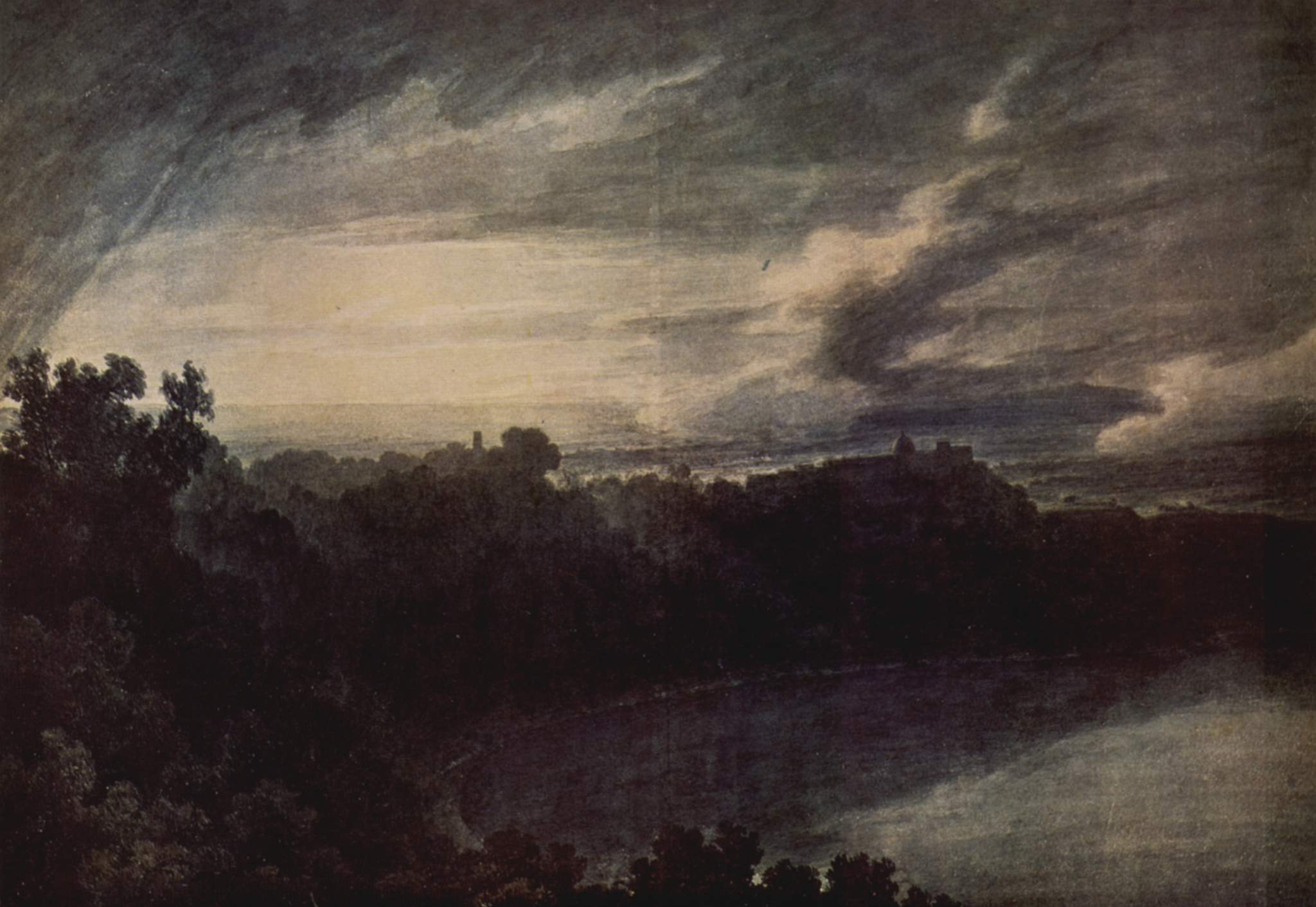
Lake of Albano and Castel Gandolfo at Sunset c. 1777, 43.5 cm (17.1 in) x 62.2 cm (24.4 in), auctioned in 2010 for £2.4 million

John Robert Cozens (1752 – 14 December 1797) was an English painter of romantic watercolour landscapes, nearly all of Continental scenes. His career was brief and his production relatively low, but he had an enormous influence on later English watercolourists. Cozens painted striking watercolours which influenced Thomas Girtin and J. M. W. Turner, who together made copies of many of them when young, paid by Dr Monro, and has been described as "perhaps the most poetic of English painters". Despite using a "very limited palette, usually blues, greys, and greens, [and] the simplest of compositions ... there is a grandeur and simplicity about his best work which appeals directly to the heart". John Constable described Cozens as "all poetry", and "the greatest genius that ever touched landscape."

According to Andrew Wilton, Cozens was the "progenitor" of the revolution in British watercolour in the 1790s, having "in the 1770s systematised a method of applying watercolour pigment, without the admixture of bodycolour or any other substance, that for the first time comprehensively answered the requirement of landscape painting that it should represent vast expanses of land and sky". Martin Hardie says he was one of the first British watercolourists to use the medium consistently for its own sake as a purely expressional means", rather than a topographical record.

Most of his watercolours show scenes from two extended visits to the Alps and Italy, where he made numerous sketches, mostly just in line and a greyish wash. These were then worked up into fresh paintings back in London, often the same sketch being used a number of times, sometimes with different effects. At the age of 42 he had a complete mental collapse, from which he never recovered in the remaining three years of his life.

In June 2010 Cozens's Lake Albano (c.1777) sold at auction, at Sotheby's in London, for £2.4 million, a record for any 18th-century British watercolour. The "Statement of the Expert Adviser to the Secretary of State" in connection with the export of this noted that the previous record Cozens price was £240,000 for Cetara, Gulf of Salerno, Italy, sold at Christie's in November 2004 to the National Gallery of Art in Washington. In 2019 a temporary export ban was placed on the Lake Albano work, in the hope that the funds to match the price could be raised by a UK collection. More typical recent prices (after a general decline in watercolour prices) are below £100,000.

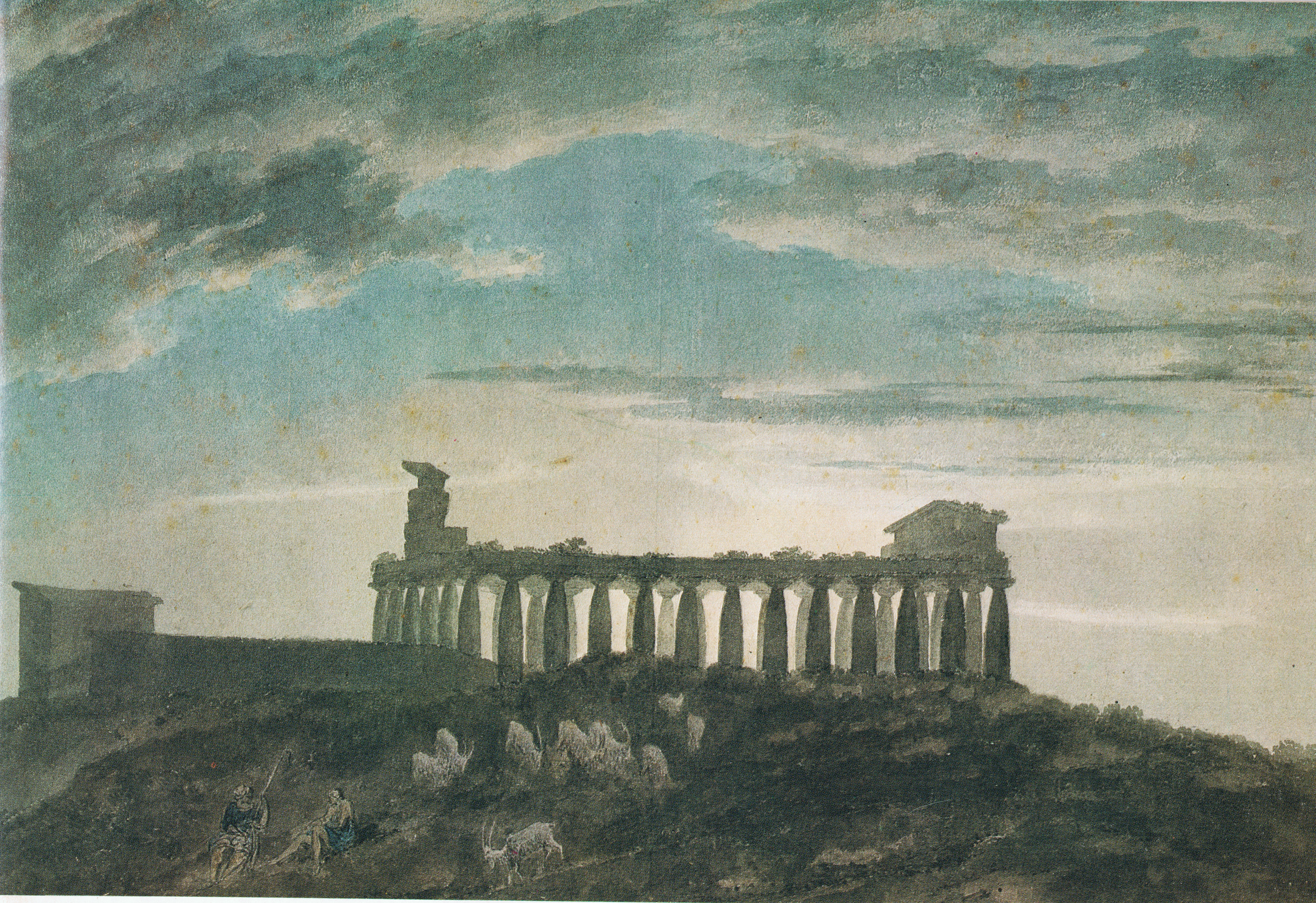
The Small Temple at Paestum, 10 x 14.5 inches, 7 November 1782. Once in the collections of William Beckford and Agnew

== Biography ==
=== Early life ===
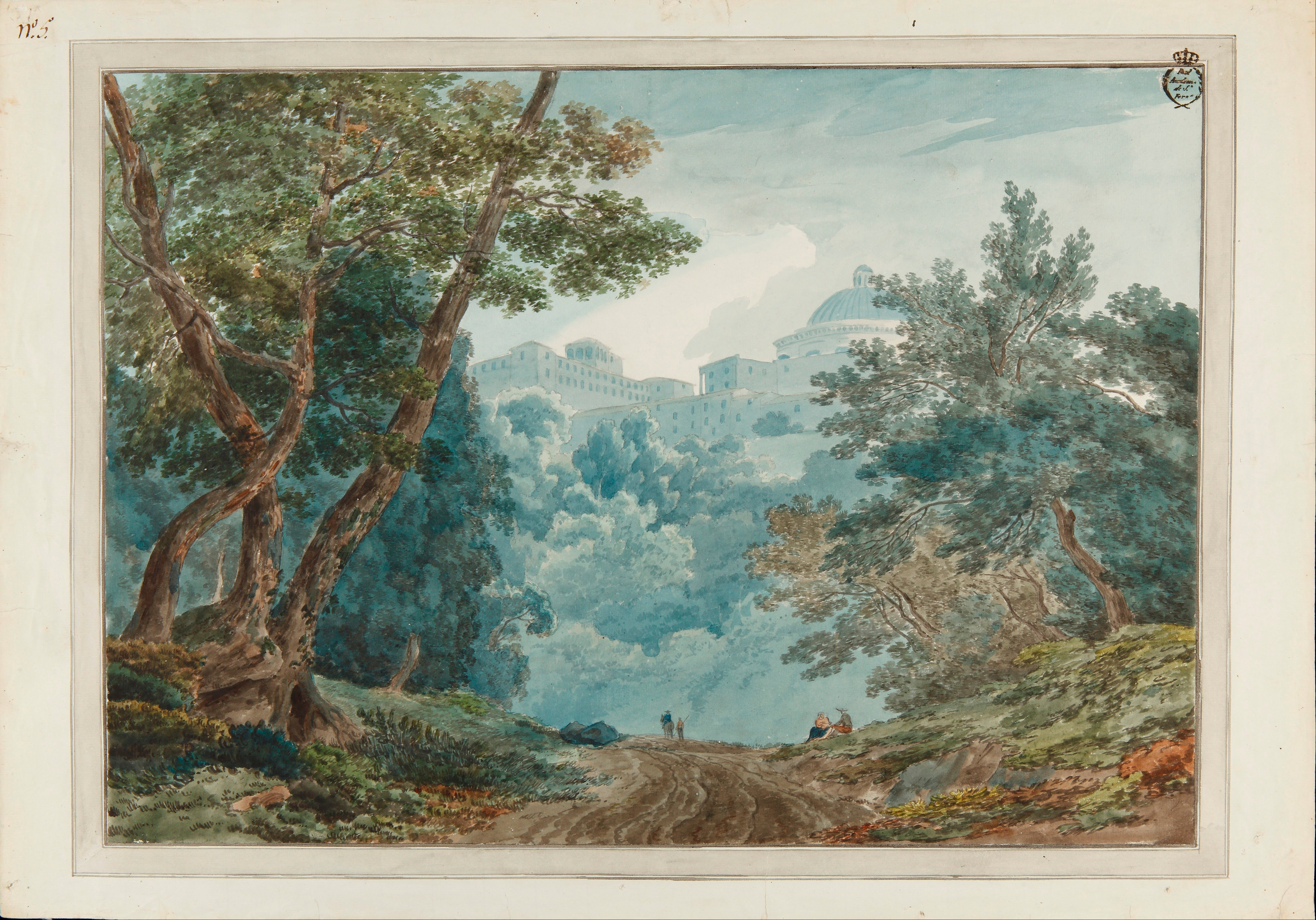
Ariccia (near Rome), from his first Italian visit

The son of the Russian-born drawing master and watercolourist Alexander Cozens (c. 1717–1786), John Robert Cozens was born in London. His mother Charlotte was a daughter of John Pine (1690–1756), an engraver with a print shop in St Martin's Lane, who was a friend of William Hogarth, who included a portrait of him as the "fat friar" in The Gate of Calais, one of his prints. Alexander was a fashionable teacher of watercolour, "for whom theorising and codifying were as natural as breathing", who had developed theories on depicting landscapes, including his famous (or notorious) advocacy of building compositions up from random blots of ink, earning him the derisive epithet of the "Blotmaster". Alexander wrote several books on the theory and practice of landscape watercolours, and John Robert tended to be referred to in the contemporary art world by terms such as "the younger Cozens".

John Robert studied under his father and his mature work shows his father's influence in several important respects, including the very muted colour values, and the readiness to abandon balanced, harmonized and idealized compositions in the tradition of Claude Lorrain and Nicolas Poussin. He began to exhibit some early drawings (as watercolours were usually then called) with the Society of Artists in 1767, when he was only 15. An album of drawings in the National Library of Wales includes sketches of the dramatic rock formations of the Peak district made in 1772 on a trip to Matlock, Derbyshire.

His uncle Robert Edge Pine was a portrait painter based in Bath, Somerset (as was another painter-uncle Simon Pine, who died in 1772), and between about 1772 and 1776 Cozens also lived there "with or near his uncle", who later moved to America. In 1773 Cozens's name appears on a set of eight etched prints Eight Views of the most Elegant Scenes of and in Bath, sold individually for a guinea each, uncoloured; many copies were then hand-coloured by dealers or buyers. Most are townscapes of the new Georgian town, but include some views of the distant city with a landscape foreground, but without much sign of his individual style.

In 1776 he exhibited the large oil painting, A Landscape with Hannibal in His March Over the Alps, Showing to His Army the Fertile Plains of Italy (now lost) at the Royal Academy in London. This painting was the only oil that Cozens exhibited at the Academy and may have influenced J. M. W. Turner's to paint of a similar subject decades later.

A small near-monochrome watercolour roundel, 26 cm across, by Cozens of the subject was one of a group of five roundels. Andrew Wilton had noted that although they are thought to date from before Cozens's foreign travels, it "displays in remarkably complete form the style Cozens is supposed to have evolved specifically in response to his experience of the Alps". Cozens stood for election as an Associate of the Academy the same year, but received no votes. He never stood again, nor submitted other works (watercolours were then not accepted).

=== The two European trips ===
Between 1776 and 1779 he travelled to Switzerland and Italy, where he drew Alpine and north Italian views. He travelled with the wealthy and highly cultivated Richard Payne Knight (then 26) as far as Rome, where Cozens remained until 1779, when he returned to London. Most of the sketches made on this trip were of Swiss scenes; they are now "widely scattered", with 24 in the British Museum. They show his style developing, rather than complete.

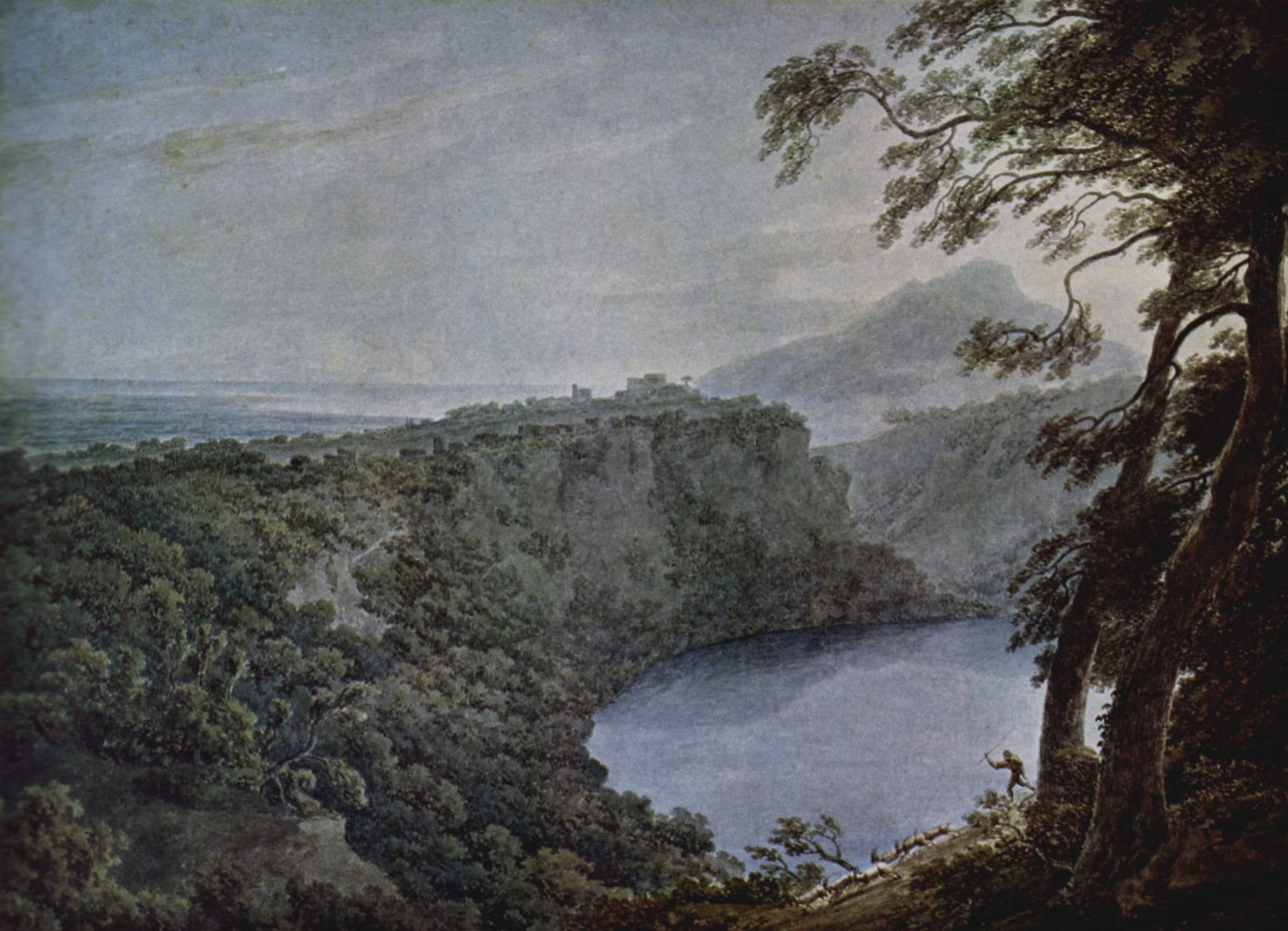
Lake Nemi and Genzano, Italy c. 1777.

Back in London the very wealthy author and collector William Beckford, a friend, pupil and patron of Alexander Cozens, paid Cozens to turn his sketches into watercolours, as did other collectors. In 1782 he made his second visit to Italy, as part of the large entourage of Beckford (then 22), spending time at Naples from July, where both Cozens and Beckford had bouts of malaria. They then stayed with Sir William Hamilton, the British ambassador to the Kingdom of Naples at his villa in Portici near the city, and (initially) Hamilton's wife Catherine, who died in August 1782. In September Beckford sailed for home, with Cozens remaining in Italy. The Welsh painter Thomas Jones, then part of the same circle in Naples, noted that this left Cozens "once more a free agent and loosed from the shackles of fantastic folly and caprice". His works show scenes from as far south as Sicily, though Martin Hardie did not think that he actually went there, suggesting that several images of Mount Etna and other Sicilian sites were based on works by others.

=== Back in London ===
In 1783 he returned to England, soon after which he fell out with Beckford, who complained in letters to Alexander about the late delivery of promised paintings. It is on his paintings of Continental subjects that his fame largely rests, and these were the bulk of his output; many subjects were repeated in different versions. The subjects repeated most often include Lake Albano, Lake Nemi, the Villa d'Este and other views at Tivoli, and the Greek temples at Paestum. Many, very likely most, of his watercolours were evidently produced back in England, based on the sketch drawings he had made abroad; most are not dated. Scholarship can compare the various versions, and the progress of the image from the original sketch made in Italy; a lot essay by Sotheby's shows the original sketch, a tracing of it by Cozens, one of his watercolour paintings, and a copy by Turner. A sweeping Alpine view, Pays de Valais, is based on a sketch of 1776 from his first tour, now in the Soane Museum, which on the verso has a list of "eight patrons who had ordered finished watercolours of the subject". Known surviving versions are in the Fitzwilliam Museum, Yale, Leeds, Birmingham (2), Agnew's (in 1994), and Stourhead, the only one whose provenance can be traced back to a name on the list.

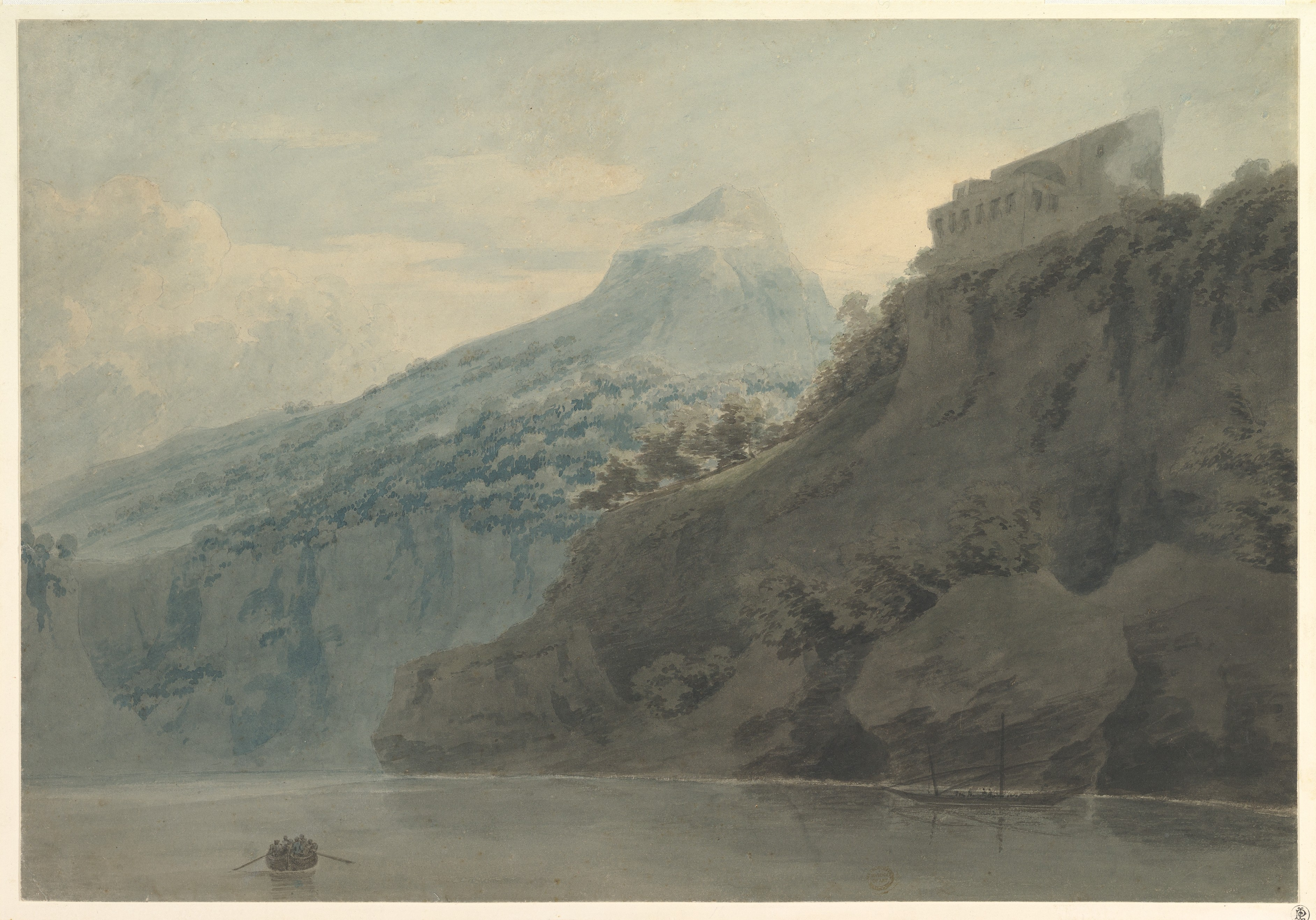
On the Gulf of Salerno near Vietri, Metropolitan

He only left a few paintings of English scenes, though six versions are known of London from Greenwich Hill; two are dated with 1791 and 1792, though by the 1790s he seems to have been producing fewer paintings in general. One unusually large watercolour (642 x 920 mm, dated 1790) of The Chasm at Delphi was based third-hand on a sketch made by James "Athenian" Stuart, itself made "under the direction of a traveller who had recently visited the spot".

There are a number of surviving sketchbooks from the second visit; the "Beaumont Album" has 215 drawings and belonged to Sir George Beaumont and his descendants from around the time of Cozens's death until 1967. It is now in the Yale Center for British Art. Seven sketchbooks are now in the Whitworth Art Gallery, Manchester.

=== Later years ===
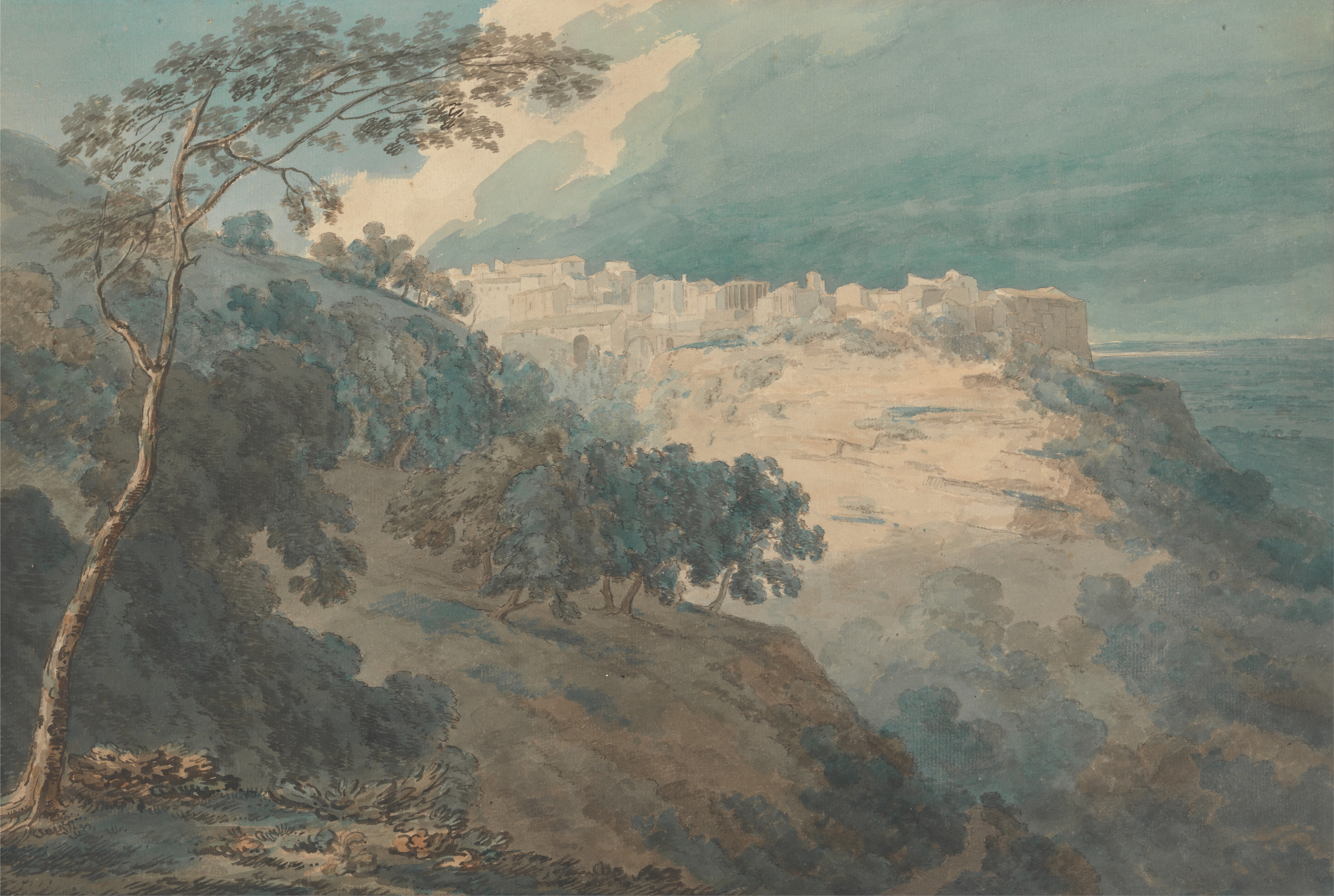
Tivoli, 371 mm (14.6 in) x 533 mm (21 in), dated 1778, Yale

Few details are known about his life in the years between his return in 1783 and his breakdown in 1794, essentially his thirties. He may have taught, as most watercolourists did, as well as working up his sketches into paintings. He was probably the "Mr Cozens" paid as drawing master to the Princes Ernest (born 1771) and Augustus (born 1773) in Royal Household records of 1787–88. His father had been "Instructor in Drawing to the Young Princes" since 1781, but had died in 1786.

In 1789 he published Delineations of the General Character, Ramifications and Foliage of Forest Trees (or The General Character, Delineation and Foliage of Trees), a set of fourteen prints of individual trees, each 24.3 x 31.7 cm, intended mainly for studying artists; there is no title page nor any text. The prints follow in the footsteps of his father, the drawing master at Eton College, who had published The Shape Skeleton and Foliage of Thirty Two Species of Trees in 1771 with a similar purpose. John Robert's prints are very technically accomplished, apparently combining aquatint and soft-ground etching.

=== Mental collapse ===
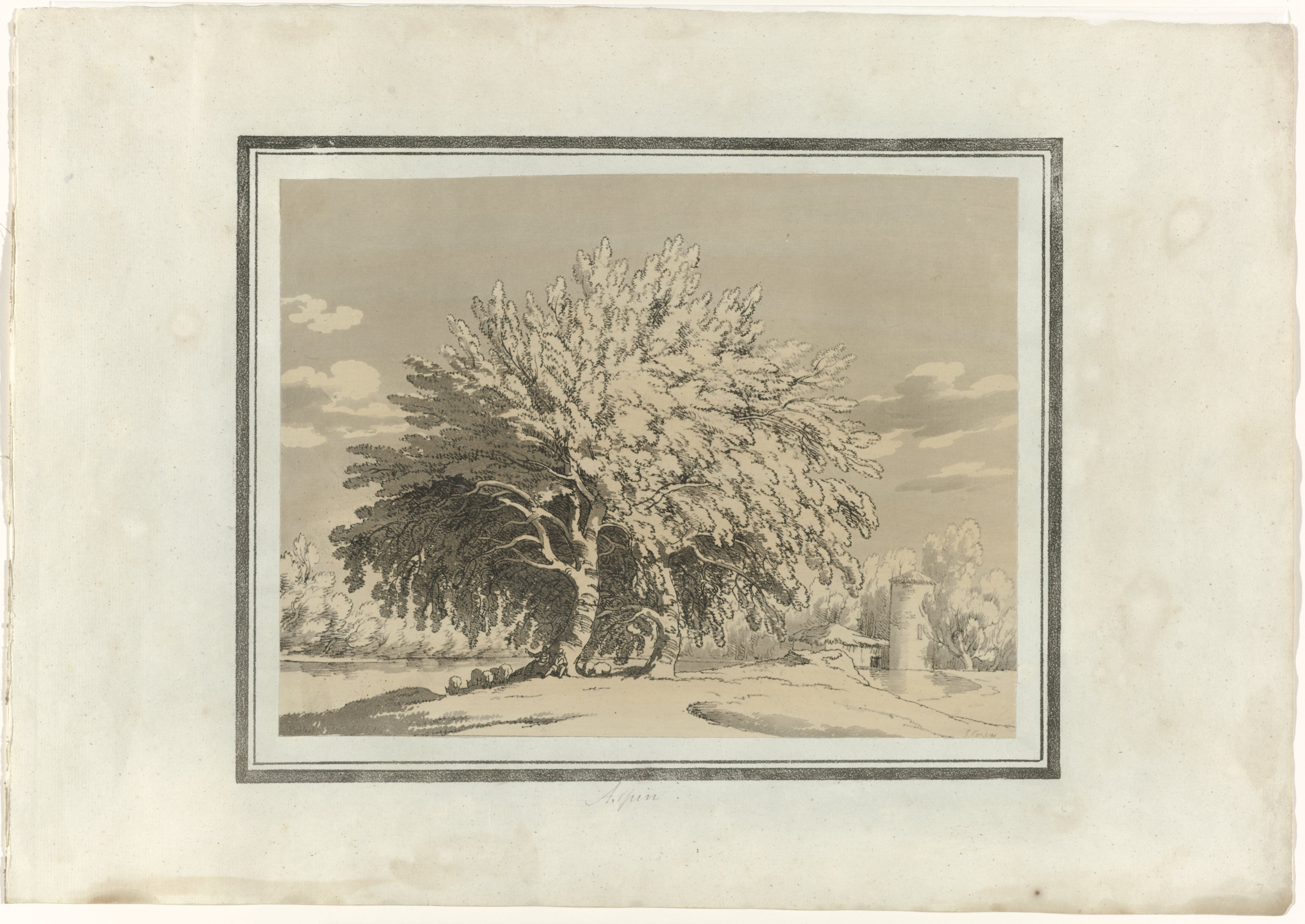
Aspen from the tree series, 1789, 24.3 x 31.7 cm

In 1794, at the age of 42 and three years before he died, he suffered a complete nervous breakdown, from which never recovered, and was taken into the care of Dr Thomas Monro, chief physician of the Bethlem Royal Hospital asylum, who was also a considerable collector and patron. Cozens was never (contrary to some claims in the past) in the Bethlem Hospital himself; this was to be avoided if other solutions could be afforded. Monro had access to Cozens's sketches, and paid the young Girtin and Turner (both born in 1775) to copy and work up Cozens's sketches at Monro's home at Adelphi Terrace in the evenings. Turner was paid 3 shillings and sixpence a night.

Cozens was married, with two children of "about five or six" at the time of his mental breakdown. An appeal was made to the Royal Academy for a grant for his family, signed by artists including Richard Cosway, James Northcote and Joseph Farington, and 10 guineas was granted. The Academy also contributed to a subscription for his medical costs, some £70 or £80 a year, organized by Payne Knight and Beaumont, with some 15 subscribers, and Farington administering. Beckford did not contribute. Cozens died in London in December 1797.

== Public collections ==
His talent was recognized by contemporaries in artistic circles, although he died before the rise of exhibitions dedicated to watercolours, and when in 1805 Beckford sold 94 of his paintings at Christie's, they fetched a total of £509:10:6, with six realizing over £10, and the most expensive painting, of Rome from the Villa Madama, £21.

His works are in most large English collections, and the largest American ones. The Victoria & Albert Museum has some 30 works, Tate Britain 17, National Galleries of Scotland 4, and the Yale Center for British Art lists 342 works, though nearly all are pencil sketches. The National Gallery of Art in Washington has three paintings, and had paid the previous record price before 2010 for Cetara on the Gulf of Salerno.
