= John Pine =

British engraver (1690–1756)

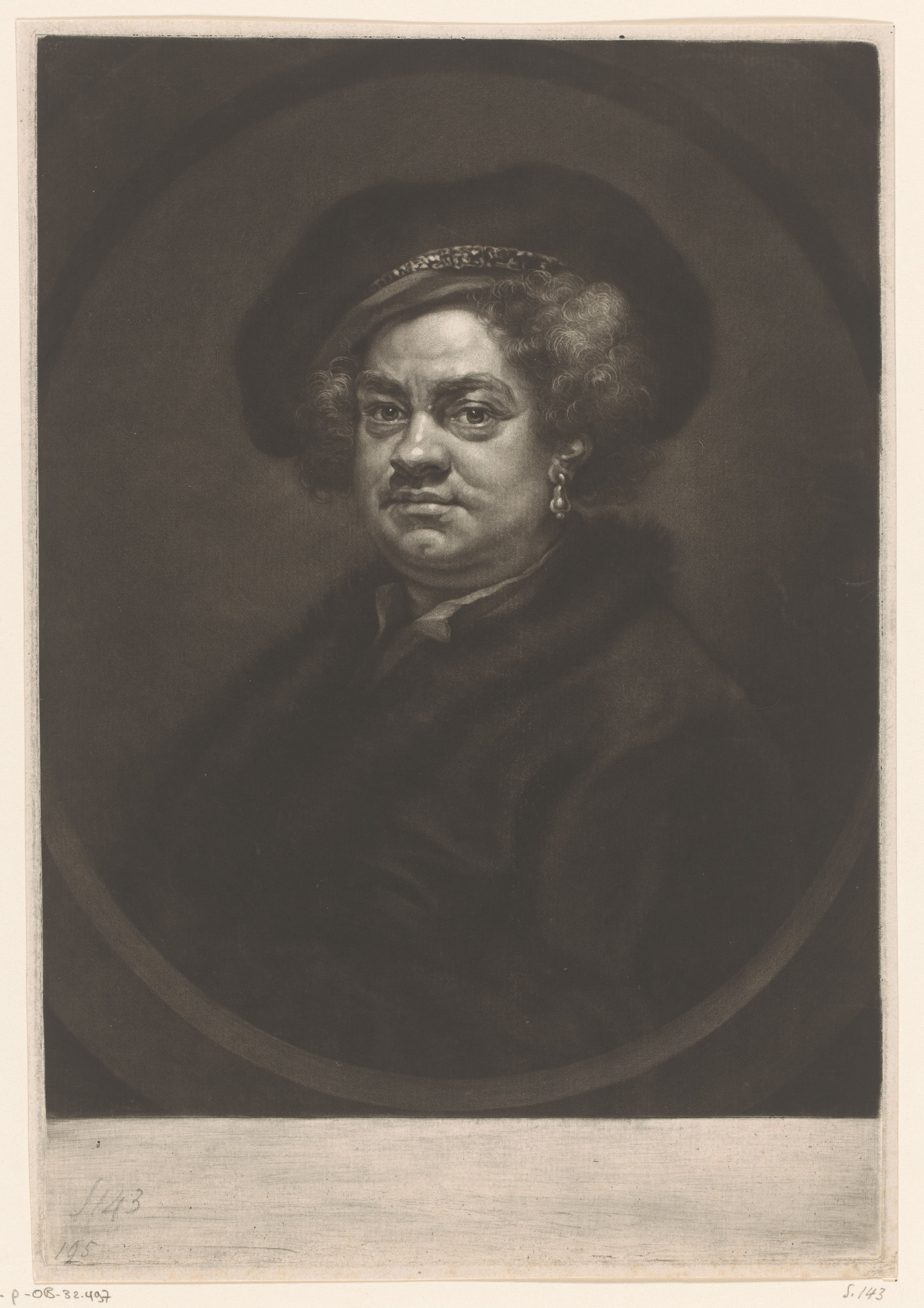
Portrait of John Pine by William Hogarth

John Pine (1690–1756) was an English engraver, print-seller with a shop on St Martin's Lane in London, print publisher, and cartographer notable for his artistic contribution to the Augustan style and Newtonian scientific paradigm that flourished during the British Enlightenment.

== Early life and apprenticeships ==
Little is known of Pine's parents or ancestry. Biographical sketches frequently refer to him as black or of African ancestry, especially in the lore of Freemasonry, a society with which he became affiliated. However, the United Grand Lodge of England has not been able to verify such claims.

Pine began his career as an apprentice goldsmith. He was also apprenticed to the French engraver Bernard Picart (1673–1733), who was associated with a movement described by historian Margaret Jacob as the "Radical Enlightenment".

== Career ==
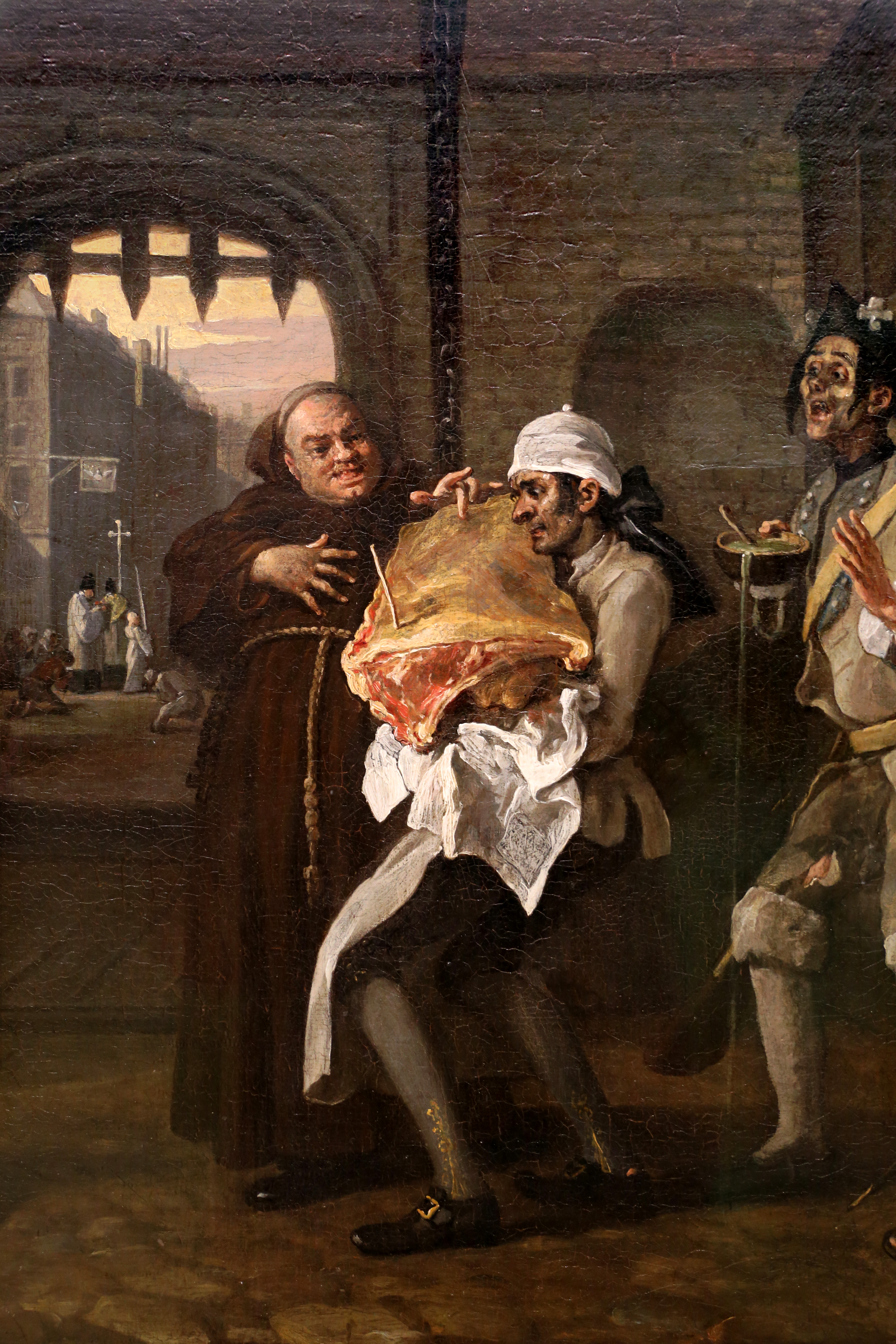
Pine as the "fat friar" in Hogarth's The Gate of Calais

Pine was a close friend of William Hogarth, who also began his career as an engraver. It appears likely that their careers were mutually reinforcing, even though Pine remained principally in the field of engraving while Hogarth became a famous painter. Hogarth painted Pine several times; once, in his 1749 engraving The Gate of Calais, depicting him as a fat friar. Both men served as governors of the Foundling Hospital, and both were Freemasons, a social affiliation that was also a means of marketing their talents. Pine was a member of the Lodge that met at the Horn Tavern in Westminster and joined with other Lodges to form the Grand Lodge in 1717.

Pine engraved the frontispiece of the 1723 Constitutions of the Free-Masons, which elevated his status as an artist and secured his position as principal engraver for the Grand Lodge. Subsequent work for the Grand Lodge included annual engraved lists of member Lodges, which provided details about the time and place of their meetings. These engravings included miniature signs for each Lodge symbolizing their meeting place, usually a tavern. Pine's work is an essential part of the record of early Freemasonry. He also engraved the first List of Lodges published in 1723.

In 1731, Pine worked with James Oglethorpe and the Trustees for the Establishment of the Colony of Georgia in America on the first conceptual map of the colony, illustrating many of its design principles. He may have prepared the more detailed plan for the town of Savannah, the source of which remains an intriguing mystery to town planners (see the Oglethorpe Plan).

In 1733–1737, Pine printed an edition of the works of Horace, considered a masterpiece of 18th-century book art. He entirely engraved text and illustrations for the two volumes, which consist of hundreds of pages. Subscribers who underwrote the project included the Prince of Wales, Handel, Alexander Pope, and Hogarth.

In 1735, Pine successfully collaborated with Hogarth and George Vertue in obtaining passage of a law enacted by Parliament securing copyrights for artists. This law granted specifically to him copyright on some works not otherwise original enough to receive copyright under it. In 1755 he was among those who attempted to form a royal academy for the arts, but he did not live to see it established.

Pine collaborated with surveyor John Rocque on the first detailed map of London, published in 1746.

== Legacy ==
Pine's achievements were recognized in 1743, when he became Engraver of His Majesty's Signet and Seals, and subsequently Bluemantle Pursuivant of Arms in Ordinary, a junior herald at the College of Arms.

His son, Robert Edge Pine (1730–1788), became a notable portrait painter of the late eighteenth century in both England and America. He painted George II and the famous actor David Garrick before emigrating to America where he painted Washington and other figures of the Revolutionary Era. Another son, Simon, became a miniature-painter in Bath, and died in 1772. Pine's daughter, Charlotte, married the painter Alexander Cozens, so John Robert Cozens was his grandson.

== Selected works ==
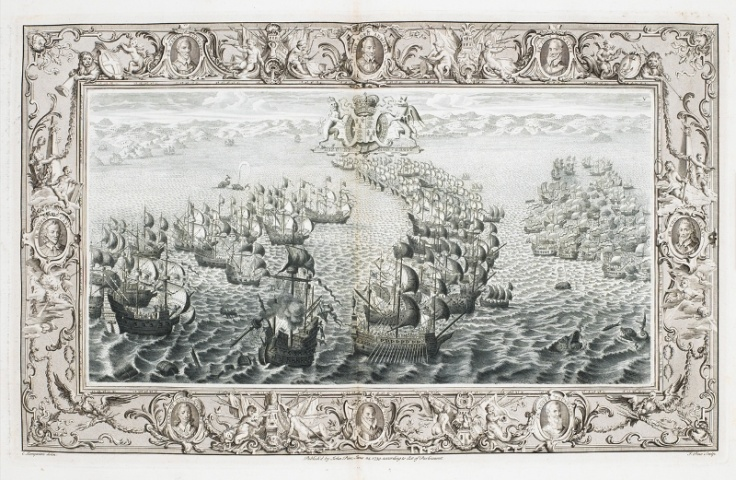
The "Armada 1588. 22 July: the burning and capture of Miguel de Oquendo's ship San Salvador" (Plate V, from The Tapestry Hangings of the House of Lords), published by Pine in 1739

- Frontispiece, Daniel Defoe's Robinson Crusoe, 1719 (a collaboration with John Clark (1683-1736))
- Illustrations, Edward Ward's Nuptial Dialogues and Debates, 1722
- Frontispiece, Constitutions of the Free-Masons, 1723
- Illustrations, King George I at ceremonies restoring the Order of the Bath, 1725
- Illustrations, Henry Pemberton's View of Newton's Philosophy, 1728
- Frontispiece, "Some Account of the Design of the Trustees for the Establishment of the Colony of Georgia in America", 1732
- Reproduction of "King John's Great Charter", 1733
- Quinti Horatii Flacci Opera, 1733–1737
- The Tapestry Hangings of the House of Lords: representing the several engagements between the English and Spanish fleets, in the ever memorable year MDLXXXVIII, 1739
- "A Plan of the Cities of London and Westminster", 1746, in 24 sheets (a collaboration with surveyor John Roque)
- "A View of the House of Commons", 1749
- "Virgil", containing the Bucolics and Georgics, 1753
