= The Welsh Opera =

1731 play by Henry Fielding

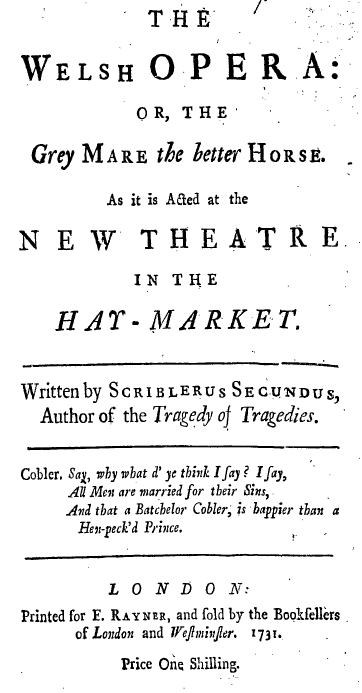
Titlepage to The Welsh Opera: or, the Grey Mare the better Horse

The Welsh Opera is a play by Henry Fielding. First performed on 22 April 1731 in Haymarket, the play replaced The Letter Writers and became the companion piece to The Tragedy of Tragedies. It was also later expanded into The Grub-Street Opera. The play's purported author is Scriblerus Secundus who is also a character in the play. This play is about Secundus' role in writing two (Fielding) plays: The Tragedy of Tragedies and The Welsh Opera.

The play served as a tribute to Scriblerians (satirists and members of the informal Scriblerus Club), as such it allowed Fielding to satirise politics. As a political allegory that satirised the government of the time, the play was subject to attacks and a ban. Critics agree that the play was bold in both its writing and its message.

== Background ==
The first mention of The Welsh Opera in production comes from a Daily Post announcement on 6 April 1731 that the play would be postponed. It first ran on 22 April 1731 with three shows following in April and another in May. These performances were in the position of companion piece to The Tragedy of Tragedies as a replacement for The Letter Writers in that position. It later ran five times with The Fall of Mortimer during the summer and four times on its own before it was expanded into The Grub-Street Opera. The expansion was put in place to capitalise on the concept that was deemed popular by the public.

The expanded version of the play, The Grub-Street Opera, was not put on for an audience, which provoked E. Rayner to print The Welsh Opera without Fielding's consent. On 26 June 1731, the Daily Journal announced that E. Rayner and H. Cook published an edition of The Welsh Opera, which was followed by an announcement in the 28 June 1731 Daily Post:

Wheras one Rayner hath publish'd a strange Medley of Nonsense, under the Title of the Welch Opera, said to be written by the Author of the Tragedy of Tragedies; and also hath impudently affirm'd that this was a great Part of the Grub-Street Opera, which he attempts to insinuate was stopt by the Authority: This is to assure the Town, that what he hath publish'd is a very incorrect and spurious Edition of the Welch Opera, a very small Part of which was originally written by the said Author; and that it contains scarce any thing of the Grub-street Opera, excepting the Names of some of the Characters and a few of the Songs: This later Piece hath in it above fifty entire new Songs; and is so far from having been stopt by Authority (for which there could be no manner of Reason) that it is only postponed to a proper Time, when it is not doubted but the Town will be convinced how little that Performance agrees with the intolerable and scandalous Nonsense of this notorious Paper Pyrate.

== Cast ==
- Scriblerus Secundus
- Madam Apshinken

== Plot ==
The play introduces Scriblerus Secundus as a character and no longer simply a commentary to the print editions of Fielding's plays. In a speech, he mentions his role in working on The Tragedy of Tragedies and mentions that he would serve as an editor and commentary to The Welsh Opera within the play itself. However, Scriblerus storms off stage after he is informed that one of his actresses requires a drink before performing in The Welsh Opera that evening. The story of the play revolves around a country household and various disputes between the members of the family and the staff.

== Themes ==
The Welsh Opera was a tribute to the Scriblerians, especially to John Gay and to his most famous work The Beggar's Opera. This served as a means to put forth a general political view and deal with politics in a more critical way unlike any of Fielding's previous plays. The play is a political allegory that satirises Robert Walpole's government and the British monarchy. Fielding also used Gay's technique of swapping London for a pastoral environment. Within the play, a country household represents Great Britain and the people represent various leaders and political figures. Fielding also adds many praises of the pastoral life along with favourably portraying roast beef and tobacco while mocking anything foreign.

The play was attacked for its political implications, which later resulted in a ban on the play and its sequel from being performed. However, Fielding does not favour any political party; instead, he attacks both parties while recognising their importance to the nation as a whole. His attacks are personal, especially in alluding to rumours that the Prince of Wales was impotent. The play did run with The Fall of Mortimer, which made fun of Walpole. The revisions to the play form The Grub-Street Opera.

== Sources ==
Part of satire originates from the events surrounding the feud between Walpole and William Pulteney, 1st Earl of Bath that gained intensity during the creation of the Treaty of Seville and during the Civil List debate. Later in January 1731, Sir William Yonge, 4th Baronet produced Sedition and Defamation Display'd, a pamphlet that mocked Pulteney and defended Yonge's friend, Walpole. Pulteney, in return, dueled with John Hervey, 2nd Baron Hervey, another Walpole friend, after mistaking that it was Hervey who wrote Sedition and Defamation Display'd. Although no one was hurt, the fighting continued in the form of pamphlet attacks until 1 July 1731 when King George II removed Pulteney from the Privy Council. Many works began to satirise elements of the battle between Pulteney and Walpole, including the poems The Devil Knows What and The Compromise (March 1731); these poems depict both Pulteney and Walpole as equivalent complicit in the unfolding events, which is later picked up by Fielding.

== Response ==
The contemporary view of The Welsh Opera was split: the common people enjoyed the show, but the members of the government did not. However, there was no prohibition of the play by the government. This, according to F. Homes Dudden, encouraged Fielding to expand the play into The Grub-Street Opera. John Loftis focuses on the blatant politics of Fielding's piece and declared, "If the political meaning of The Tragedy of Tragedies is mild and ambiguous, that of Fielding's The Welsh Opera [...] is audacious and absolutely clear". Thomas Cleary wrote that the revised version "is a much better play".

Robert Hume believes that, in The Welsh Opera, "Fielding daringly vented his penchant for burlesque. Its politicality has often been overestimated, but its audacity is beyond question." Likewise, the Battestins point out that "the play cannot have been acceptable to the authorities; it is too impudent in making a public spectacle of the foibles of the Royal Family". Harold Pagliaro characterised the play as "often droll and always merry." Thomas Lockwood declares that the plays The Welsh Opera and The Grub-Street Opera are characterised by a "spirit of fun" but are complicated by the 18th-century politics that gave them birth.
