= The Roast Beef of Old England =

English patriotic ballad

The Roast Beef of England
"The Roast Beef of Old England" is used by both the Royal Navy and the United States Marine Corps. This version is performed by the United States Navy Band. Almost all units within the Canadian Armed Forces also use this as the entry tune to officers' mess dinners.

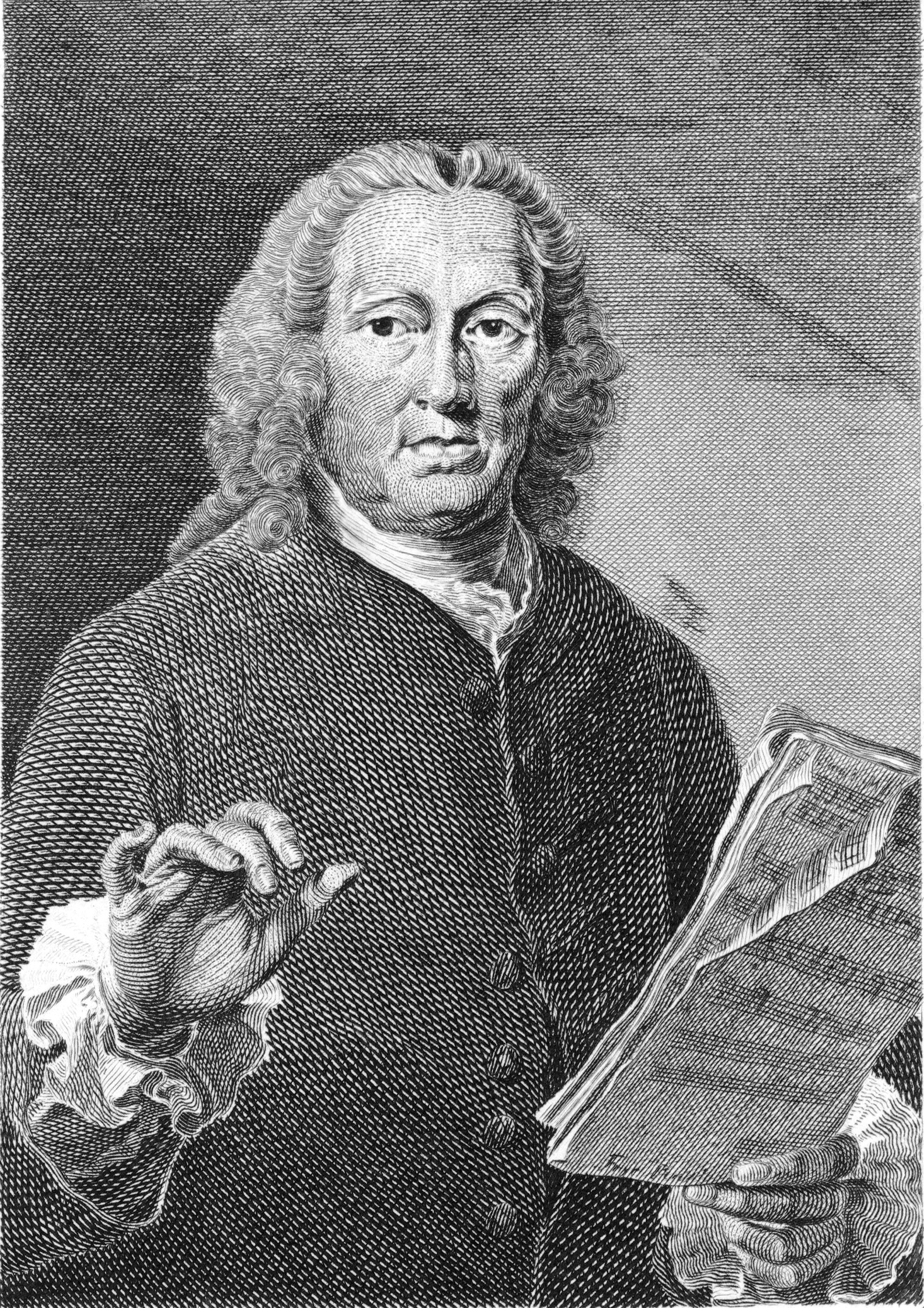
Portrait of composer Richard Leveridge

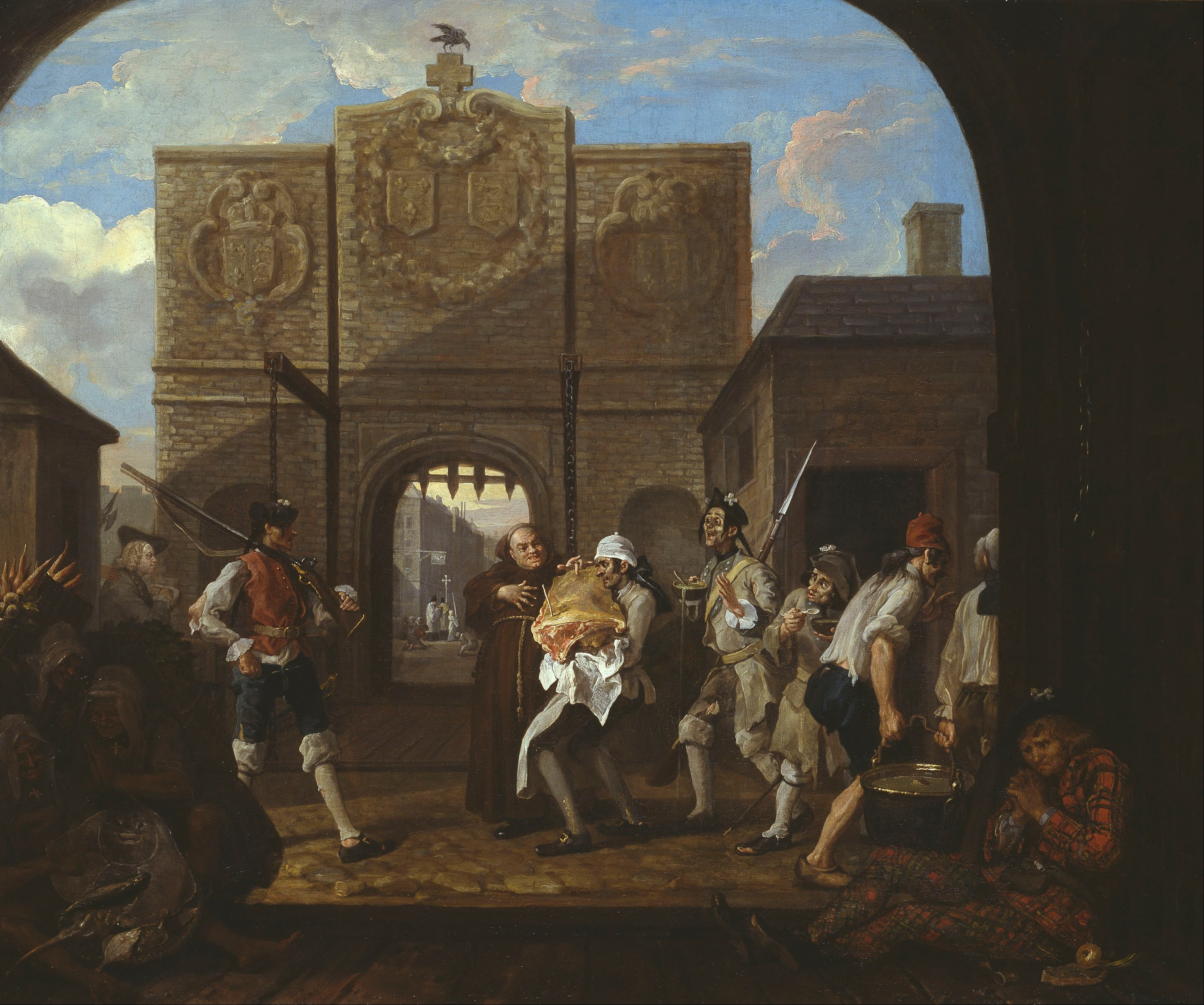
The Roast Beef of Old England by William Hogarth

"The Roast Beef of Old England" is an English patriotic ballad. The lyrics were written by Henry Fielding—set to the air tune The King's Old Courtier—for his play The Grub-Street Opera, which was first performed in 1731. The lyrics were added to over the next twenty years. The song increased in popularity when given a new setting by the composer Richard Leveridge, and it became customary for theatre audiences to sing it before, after, and occasionally during, any new play. The Royal Navy always goes in to dine at Mess Dinners to the tune, which is also played at United States Marine Corps formal mess dinners during the presentation of the beef. Officers of the Royal Artillery are also played in to dinner by this tune.

The song provided the popular title for a 1748 painting by William Hogarth: O the Roast Beef of Old England (The Gate of Calais).

== Lyrics ==
When mighty Roast Beef was the Englishman's food,
It ennobled our veins and enriched our blood.
Our soldiers were brave and our courtiers were good
Oh! the Roast Beef of old England,
And old English Roast Beef!

But since we have learnt from all-vapouring France
To eat their ragouts as well as to dance,
We're fed up with nothing but vain complaisance
Oh! the Roast Beef of Old England,
And old English Roast Beef!

Our fathers of old were robust, stout, and strong,
And kept open house, with good cheer all day long,
Which made their plump tenants rejoice in this song—
Oh! The Roast Beef of old England,
And old English Roast Beef!

But now we are dwindled to, what shall I name?
A sneaking poor race, half-begotten and tame,
Who sully the honours that once shone in fame.
Oh! the Roast Beef of Old England,
And old English Roast Beef!

When good Queen Elizabeth sat on the throne,
Ere coffee, or tea, or such slip-slops were known,
The world was in terror if e'er she did frown.
Oh! The Roast Beef of old England,
And old English Roast Beef!

In those days, if Fleets did presume on the Main,
They seldom, or never, return'd back again,
As witness, the Vaunting Armada of Spain.
Oh! The Roast Beef of Old England,
And old English Roast Beef!

Oh then we had stomachs to eat and to fight
And when wrongs were cooking to do ourselves right.
But now we're a... I could, but goodnight!
Oh! the Roast Beef of Old England,
And old English Roast Beef!

== See also ==
- Merry England

== External multimedia ==
- Tune played on fife and drum by USMC band.
