= The March of the Guards to Finchley =

1750 painting by William Hogarth

The painting

The March of the Guards to Finchley, also known as The March to Finchley or The March of the Guards, is a 1750 oil-on-canvas painting by the English artist William Hogarth, owned by and on display at the Foundling Museum. Hogarth was well known for his satirical works, and the painting was described by Hogarth himself as "steeped in humour". It fictionally depicts the British Army's foot guards marching northwards on Tottenham Court Road to Finchley to defend London from the advancing Jacobite Army during the Jacobite rising of 1745. It portrays the soldiers in a humorous light, placing exaggerated emphasis on their lack of training and discipline. Originally intended as a gift to George II, the king was insulted by the apparent jab at his best troops and rejected it. Upset at the rejection, Hogarth instead presented the painting to Frederick the Great.

== Historical background ==
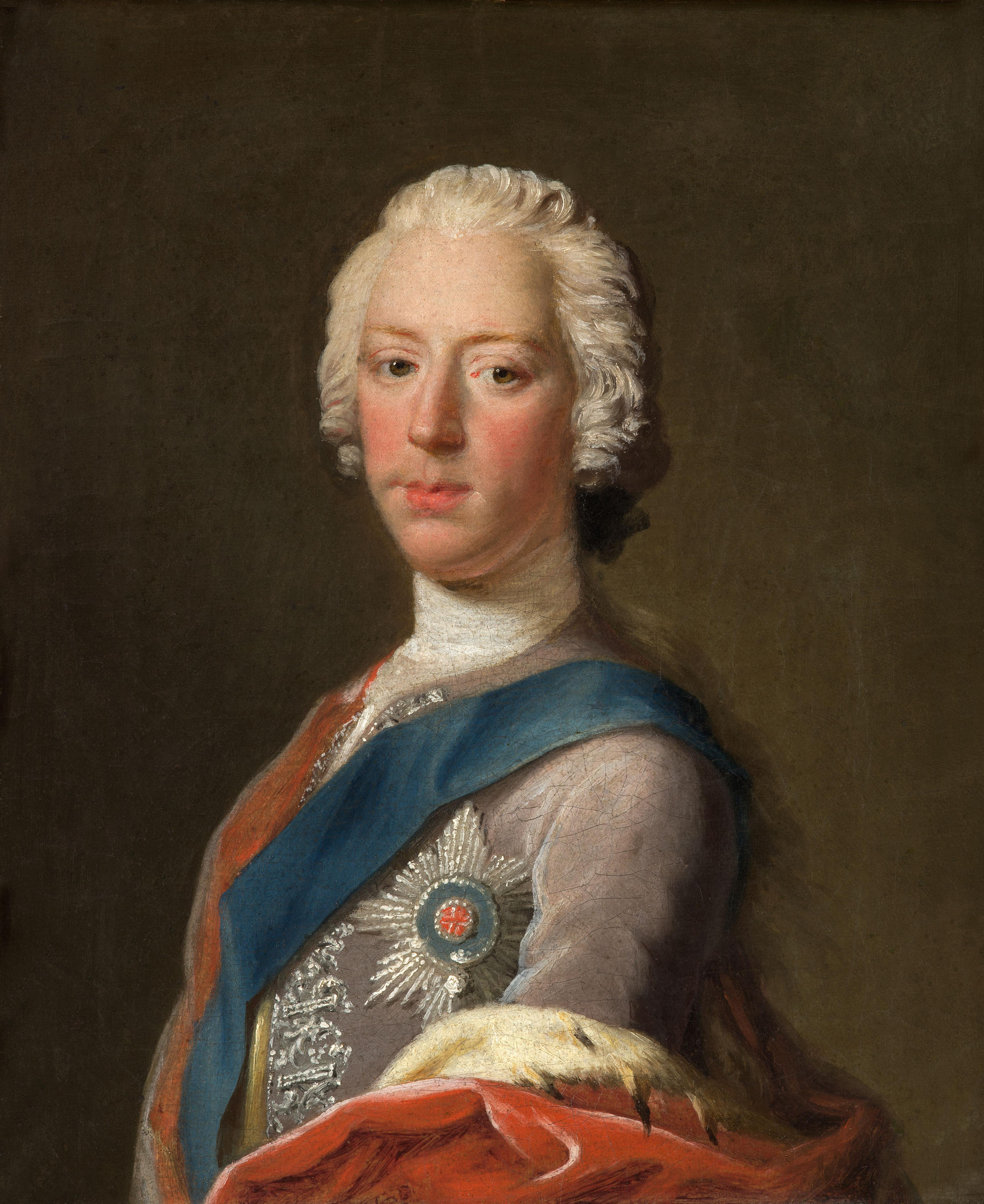
Charles Edward Stuart, who led the Jacobite rising of 1745

The Jacobite risings were a series of rebellions which occurred in Great Britain between 1689 and 1746, which Jacobites attempted to restore the House of Stuart to the British throne. In August 1745 the final Jacobite rising broke out in Scotland after Charles Edward Stuart landed from France to overthrow George II of Great Britain. Raising an army of Jacobites Stuart defeated government troops in Scotland before invading England and marching on London. The British government mustered all the troops available in Britain to defend against the Jacobite advance, and several volunteer regiments were raised in England to assist in driving back Stuart's army. However, the Jacobite army stopped at Derby when Stuart realised he did not have enough support from English Jacobites and returned to Scotland, where his army was defeated and dispersed at the 1746 Battle of Culloden by government troops, ending the rebellion. Stuart eventually fled back to France, ending the Jacobite cause as a serious political movement.

== Painting ==
=== Background ===
Hogarth completed March of the Guards to Finchley in 1750. The work was initially meant as a gift to George II, and a print was sent before the release of the painting to the Royal Palace for his approval. However, George II had been expecting an artwork that honoured his most favoured guards, not mocked them – accounts state he was offended by what he considered an insult on Hogarth's part. The following dialogue is said to have taken place between George II and the deliverer of the portrait, William Stanhope, 1st Earl of Harrington, when the painting was taken to the King for inspection:

"Pray, who is this Hogarth?"
"A painter, my liege."
"I hate painting and poetry too! Neither the one nor the other ever did any good!"
"The picture, please your majesty, must undoubtedly be considered as a burlesque!"
"What? A painter burlesque a soldier? He deserves to be picketed for his insolence! Take this trumpery out of my sight."

Soon thereafter, the painting was returned to Hogarth, who was reportedly mortified by the King's response to what he considered to be one of his finest works. Hogarth later modified the inscription to read "the King of Prussia", rather than "the King of England", before presenting the work to Frederick the Great, who met the work with more enthusiasm and acknowledgement of its artistry. However, Frederick the Great was not an expert on the arts and was more known for his military talents; some have speculated that this explains his positive reception to the work.

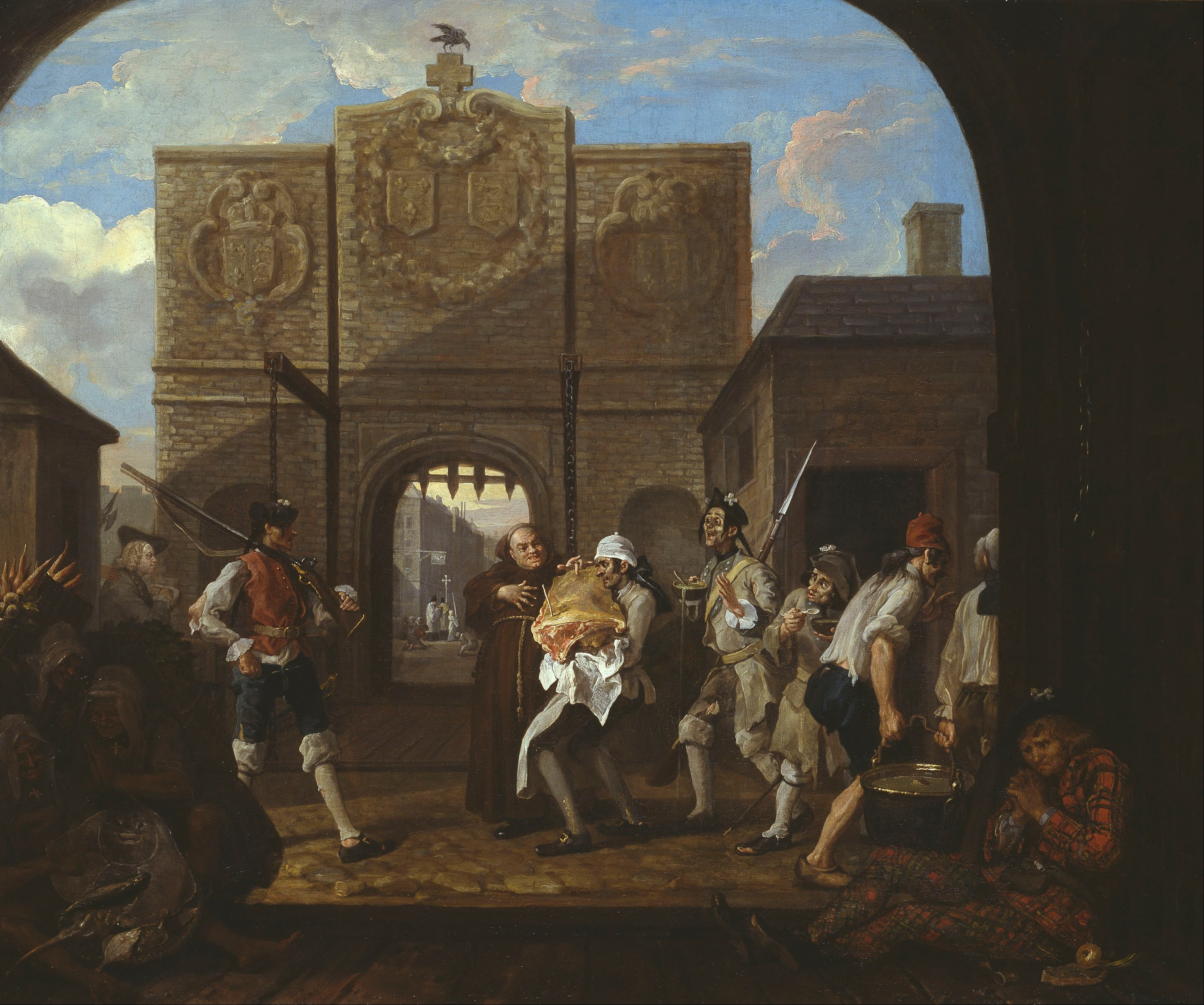
The Gate of Calais, which served as a counterpoint to The March of the Guards to Finchley

The patriotism of the painting provides a satirical counterpoint to Hogarth's overt antipathy to the French, evident in his painting The Gate of Calais, completed in 1748. Hogarth's later dedication of March to the King of Prussia further enforces this view; Frederick the Great was a renowned military strategist, but not an art connoisseur. The composition of the picture may have been inspired by Jean-Antoine Watteau's Départ de Garnison.

An engraved version, by Hogarth's assistant, Luke Sullivan, was published shortly after the painting was completed, though Hogarth made further alterations to the engraving ten years later. The engraving was unusual in that it was not a reversed image of the original painting. Hogarth priced the published artwork for a price of seven shillings and sixpence each copy, rising to half a Guinea after the subscription closed. In advertisements for the painting, Hogarth referred to a subscription-based extra whereby buyers who deposited another three shillings on top of the seven and sixpence would be considered in a lottery for the ownership of the original copy, which would be delivered to the winning subscriber after the engraving had been finished. Hogarth's engraving of A Stand of Arms, Musical Instruments, Etc. served as the subscription and lottery ticket. As noted by Hogarth in the 1 May 1750 edition of The General Advertiser, this subscription offer ended on 30 April 1750. At the day of closure, there were 1843 chances sold and 167 chances still remaining in Hogarth's lottery, and he gave this remainder to the Foundling Hospital, an establishment to which he had, in the past, been a lucrative donor. Holding almost 10% of the tickets, the Hospital won the lottery and the original; Hogarth scholar Ronald Paulson considers the lottery was rigged from the start. Today the painting is owned by and on display at the Foundling Museum.

=== Analysis ===
The painting depicts a scene on Tottenham Court Road, a bustling street on the north side of London. The foot guards of the British Army have rendezvoused there on their way to engage the rebels, and numerous soldiers are caught amongst the crowd. Orderly lines of soldiers march away in the distance; meanwhile, a disarrayed, misshapen mass of soldiers engaging in a range of unbecoming behaviours crowds the foreground. Paradoxically, the work both highlights the dissolute and disreputable nature of the guardsmen and shows that they can be transformed into a disciplined fighting force, with the drummer and boy fifer summoning the soldiers to their duty.

A drunken soldier rejects water in favour of more alcohol

In the approximate centre of the piece, two women apparently quarrel fiercely over the courtship of a grenadier of the 1st Regiment of Foot Guards. The woman to his right, a pregnant ballad-seller, carries a basket full of copies of "God Save the King", while the older woman to his left, dressed in dark priest's robes with a crucifix swinging around the neck, holds a rolled Jacobite newspaper above her head. Some critics have seen Hogarth's incorporation of the "God Save the King" text to represent public support for the Crown: English musician and author Percy Scholes said the painting symbolises the nation "wavering between the Hanoverian Protestant Succession and Stuart Romanist Succession", with "God Save the King" "thoroughly associated with the former."

Behind the three, another soldier and a milkmaid are caught in a passionate embrace. A drummer standing to the left is similarly the centre of feminine attention – perhaps his wife and child; behind, a man urinates against the tavern wall, pained by his venereal infection. Further to the right, near the edge of the painting, a drunken soldier has collapsed to the ground from his own intoxication; despite his state, he rejects the water his comrade behind him is offering him, and instead reaches for another measure of gin from the woman to his left. Soldiers directly behind him – one of whom clenches an upturned knife – are robbing the civilians. Nearby, a hungry guard gladly takes food from the platter of a pieman. To the left-hand-side of the middleground, a boxing match between two soldiers is underway, with an eager group of spectators onlooking. Across the street, numerous prostitutes holler down to the men from open windows of Mother Douglas's house, as do soldiers to their cohorts.

According to Hogarth, several of the more prominent soldiers featured in the painting – such as the grenadier, the drummer and the drunkard – were based from models observed before the creation of the artwork. Notable in particular among these is Lord Albemarle Bertie, who was used as the model for the man seen standing with fists clenched behind the two boxers.

=== Reception ===
Critics have likened the chaotic scene of The March of the Guards to Finchley to the narrative of English satirist Henry Fielding's Tom Jones. In his Hogarth's Literary Relationships, Robert E. Moore states that the "elements" of comedy" in The March of the Guards to Finchley are "the very essence of Fielding's comedy as well":

At a first hasty glance the multiplicity of characters and action in Tom Jones, once the story has taken to the road, suggests a chaos just like the wild disorder of the "March to Finchley" [...] the structure of Tom Jones is well-nigh perfect, one of the marvels of English fiction. Likewise, in the field of painting, there has seldom been a more ordered chaos than that of the "March to Finchley".

== See also ==
- List of works by William Hogarth
