= Hyp-Doctor =

Newspaper

The Hyp-Doctor
- Founder: Richard Steele
- Founded: 15 December 1730
- Ceased publication: 1741

The Hyp-Doctor was an 18th-century weekly paper edited and produced by John 'Orator Henley'. It was a pro-Walpole newspaper established in opposition to another periodical of the period, entitled the Craftsman.

The first number of The Hyp-Doctor appeared on 15 December 1730, and it ceased publication in 1741.
