= The Gate of Calais =

Painting by William Hogarth

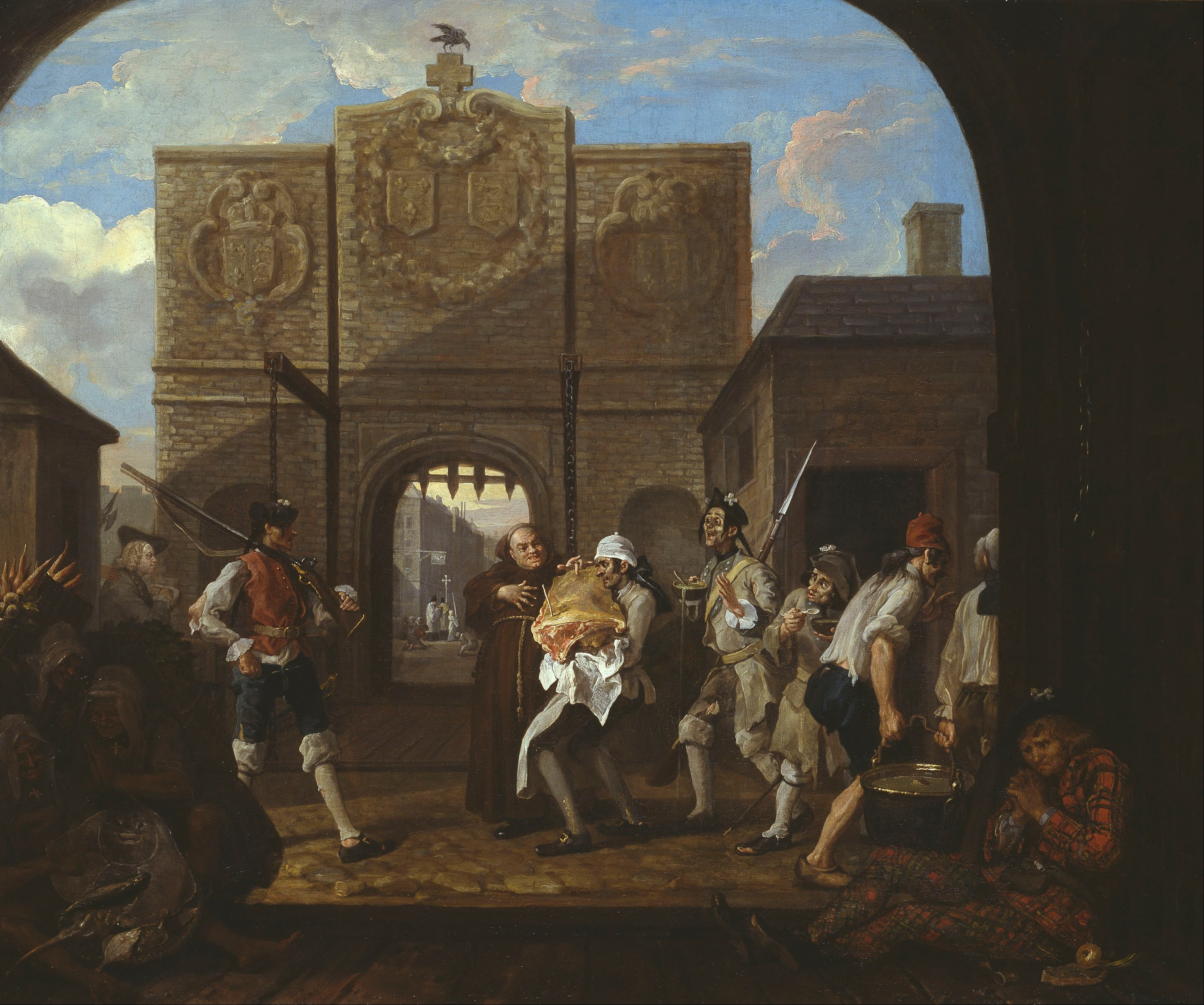
- Artist: William Hogarth
- Year: 1748
- Medium: Oil on canvas
- Dimensions: 80 cm × 96 cm (31 in × 37 5/8 in)
- Location: Tate Britain; London

The Gate of Calais or O, the Roast Beef of Old England is a 1748 painting by William Hogarth, reproduced as a print from an engraving the next year. Hogarth produced the painting directly after his return from France, where he had been arrested as a spy while sketching in Calais. The scene depicts a side of beef being transported from the harbour to an English tavern in the port, while a group of undernourished, ragged French soldiers and a fat friar look on hungrily. Hogarth painted himself in the left corner with a "soldier's hand upon my shoulder."

== Background ==
In July 1748, Hogarth took a trip to Paris, taking advantage of the armistice which preceded the signing of the Treaty of Aix-la-Chapelle in October that year. He travelled with some artist friends, including Thomas Hudson, Joseph and Alexander Van Aken, Francis Hayman, and Henry Cheere. George Vertue reports that the group split up on the return journey, with Hogarth and Hayman making their way to Calais to catch the boat to England and the others continuing their tour to Flanders and the Netherlands.

While waiting in Calais, Hogarth decided to sketch the gate of the port and drawbridge which were still adorned with the English arms (Calais having been an English enclave until 1558 and still retaining many English architectural features). His sketching of the fortifications aroused suspicion, and he was arrested and taken before the governor. Most accounts relate that Hogarth showed his other sketches to his captors; it becoming clear that he was merely an artist, he was discharged into the parole of his landlord to await the changing of the wind and the boat to England. Horace Walpole elaborates the account, reporting that Hogarth was forced to demonstrate his abilities by producing sketches and caricatures as demanded by the French, "particularly a scene of the shore, with an immense piece of beef landing for the Lion d'Argent, the English inn at Calais, and several hungry friars following it." At any rate, Hogarth was discharged and returned to England by the next boat.

== Painting ==
According to Hogarth's autobiographical notes, he started on the painting as soon as he arrived home from Calais. The painting was completed in short order, followed by an engraving early the next year.

The painting takes a viewpoint under an archway in the main outer wall of Calais. The scene within centres around a sirloin of beef destined for the English tavern, the Lion d'Argent, carried by a chef who stands out in his bright white apron and cap. The French soldiers, dressed in rags and forced to eat their watery soupe maigre, gather round licking their lips. Two soldiers in sabots can be seen carrying a cauldron of the grey unappetising soup. The Franciscan friar who greedily rubs his finger in the fat of the beef joint, is thought to be based on Hogarth's friend, the engraver and print-shop owner John Pine. In the foreground, a Highlander, an exile from the Jacobite rising of 1745, sits slumped against the wall, his strength sapped by the poor French fare – a raw onion and a crust of bread. Hogarth is seen sketching to the left in the background, but the tip of the halberd and hand of the soldier who will arrest him are just appearing round the corner behind him.

There are strong references to the celebration of Eucharist in the picture. Through the gates, under the sign of a dove (that of an inn) a Roman Catholic mass is being celebrated. In the foreground, but still aligned with those in the background under the cross of the gate, the principal characters worship the beef. The man carrying it bows under the weight appearing to offer it up to the friar on partially bended knee. Above the scene in front of the gate, the dove of peace is replaced by a carrion bird, the crow. In the foreground fishwives superstitiously worship the face of a ray, and the Jacobite also clasps his hand together in prayer.

Hogarth Brought Before the Governor of Calais as a Spy by William Powell Frith, 1851. Frith, an admirer of Hogarth, portrayed the incident that inspired the painting

Hogarth's antipathy to the French had been apparent in his art since Noon in his Four Times of the Day series, painted in 1736. The March to Finchley, which he painted in 1749/50, provides a companion theme to The Gate of Calais: it depicts a fictional gathering of robust English guardsman who are to march north to defend London against the invasion of Bonnie Prince Charlie's Jacobites in 1745. Further anti-French sentiment is apparent in his two Invasion engravings, published in 1756, and in Beer Street, where Rev. James Townley's accompanying verses stress the superiority of the English. The Gate of Calais' secondary title, O, the Roast Beef of Old England, is a reference to the popular patriotic ballad 'The Roast Beef of Old England' from Henry Fielding's The Grub-Street Opera (1731), which told of how the food "ennobled our brains and enriched our blood" and laughed at "all-vapouring France"".

The painting was bought by the 1st Earl of Charlemont sometime after the 1761 Society of Artists' Exhibition at which it was displayed, by which time England had been at war with France again for 5 years. Ian Pears believes that by showing The Gates of Calais at the exhibition (one of only three comic histories that he displayed), Hogarth was challenging the patriotic spirit of the British by asking them to pay as much for a work by an Englishman as they would for a work by a continental painter. The painting was sold in 1874 to Henry William Ferdinand Bolckow for £945. It was subsequently acquired by the 1st Duke of Westminster at an auction at Christie's in 1891 for £2572; he donated it to the National Gallery in 1895, and it was transferred to the Tate Gallery in 1951.

The gate itself was levelled in 1895, the landing at the port followed by crossing over an ancient drawbridge and entering through the old gateway into a "dark narrow" street, then emerging into a spacious Place with its town hall now lost.

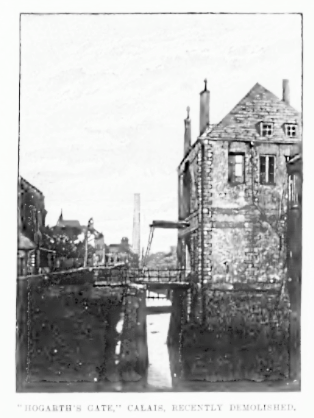
The Gate of Calais before demolition

== Print ==
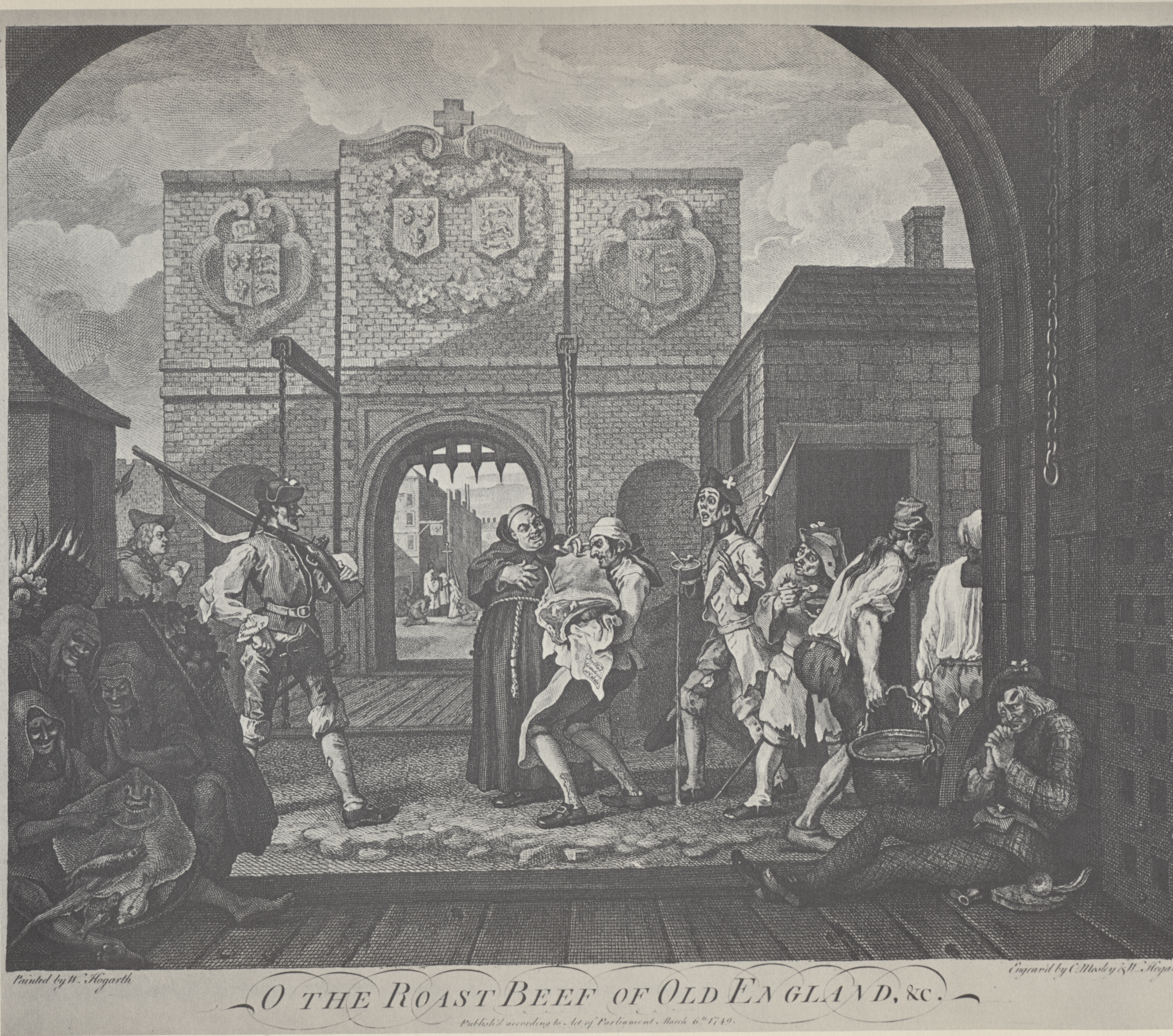
The engraving of the print. The hand on Hogarth's shoulder can now be clearly seen, as can the Scotsman and his fare

The print, produced from an engraving that was completed in part by Charles Mosley, was published on 6 March 1749. Entitled "O The Roast Beef of Old England", it was priced at 5 shillings and advertised as:

A print design'd and engrav'd by MR HOGARTH, representing a PRODIGY which lately appear'd before the Gate of CALAIS.
O the Roast-beef of Old England, &c.
To be had at the Golden Head in Leicester-Square, and at the Print Shops.

The main difference between the painting and the engraving is the crow on top of the gate, which is absent in the engraving. The crow was a late addition to the painting to disguise an accidental tear, apparently caused by the canvas falling on a nail shortly after it was completed, although no evidence of damage was found when the painting was restored in 1966.

== See also ==
- List of works by William Hogarth
