= John Henley (preacher) =

English clergyman

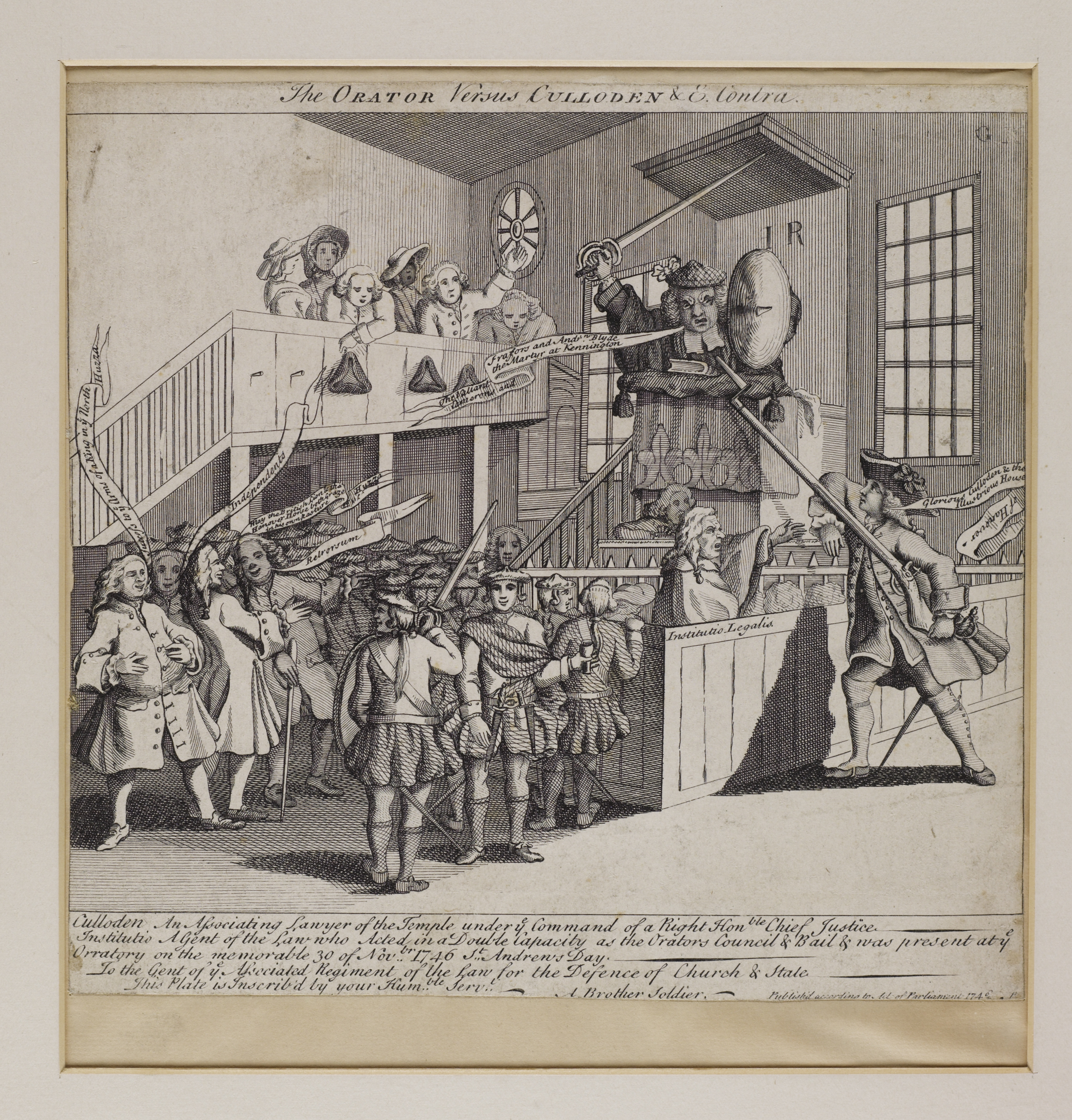
- Engraved carricature of John Henley preaching in defence of Jacobinism.
- Born: 3 August 1692; Melton Mowbray, Leicestershire, England, UK
- Died: 13 October 1756 (aged 64); London, England, UK
- Other name: Orator Henley
- Occupations: Preacher; Clergyman

John Henley (3 August 1692 – 13 October 1756), English clergyman, commonly known as 'Orator Henley', was a preacher known for showmanship and eccentricity.

== Life ==
The son of a vicar, John Henley was born in Melton Mowbray. After attending the grammar schools of Melton and Oakham, Rutland, he entered St John's College, Cambridge, "Ye College where I had ye Stupidity to be educated," as he himself said. After having taken a B.A. degree, he became assistant and, afterwards, director in the grammar school of Melton Mowbray. He was also assistant curate there.

In November 1721, after being promoted to an M.A. degree, he moved to London, where he obtained the appointment of assistant preacher and wrote several books. Quarrelling with the Bishop of London, he gave up his benefice, and began his lectures or 'Orations' on theological subjects and mundane matters. In 1723 he became Rector of Chelmondiston, Suffolk.

On 3 July 1726 Henley opened his so-called 'Oratory', a meeting room built over the shambles in Newport Market. In 1729, he transferred the scene of his operations to an old theater at Clare Market, near Lincoln's Inn Fields, where he continued to preach "on the world as it is, serious or ridiculous." "The Truth of the Gospel is in its Spirit and Moral, its practical Graces," he said, " the rest is, in Comparison, as sounding Brass, or as a tinkling Cymbal." His discourses were popular and subject to rowdy disturbances. Into his services he introduced many peculiarities. He drew up a 'Primitive Liturgy,' in which he substituted for the Nicene Creed and Athanasian Creed, two creeds taken from the Apostolical Constitutions; for his 'Primitive Eucharist' he made use of unleavened bread and mixed wine; and he distributed medals of admission to his 'Oratory' at the price of one shilling. A visitor accused Henley that money was the god whom he worshipped: "we must give One Shilling to the Door-Keeper, for the Seats were personal Property. A very fine Story indeed! And such a one, that is not to be paralleled, that we should pay a Shilling before we can worship GOD!"

Henley knew that the most original element in the services was he himself. In his Dunciad, Alexander Pope called him a

"great restorer of the good old Stage
Preacher at once and Zany of thy age."

He possessed oratorical ability and adopted a theatrical style of elocution, tuning his voice and balancing his hands. His addresses were a medley of solemnity and buffoonery. The Connoisseur, a critical weekly paper, wrote that

"the Clare-Market Orator, while he turns religion into farce, must be considered as exhibiting shews and interludes of an inferior nature, and himself regarded as a Jack-pudding in a gown and cassock."

Despite all criticism, the energetic and eccentric 'Orator' was popular with most Londoners. His services were much frequented by the Freethinkers, and he himself expressed his determination "to die a rational." He died in London on 13 October 1756.

Henley was the subject of contemporary caricatures, among them works by George Bickham the Younger and William Hogarth.

== Works ==
In 1714, he wrote a poem styled Esther, Queen of Persia, which was received with applause, and in 1719–1721, he published The Compleat Linguist; or, An Universal Grammar of all the Considerable Tongues in Being. For some years Henley edited the Hyp Doctor, a weekly paper established in opposition to the Craftsman. In 1726 he published The Primitive Liturgy: for the Use of the Oratory.
