= The Distrest Poet =

Painting by William Hogarth

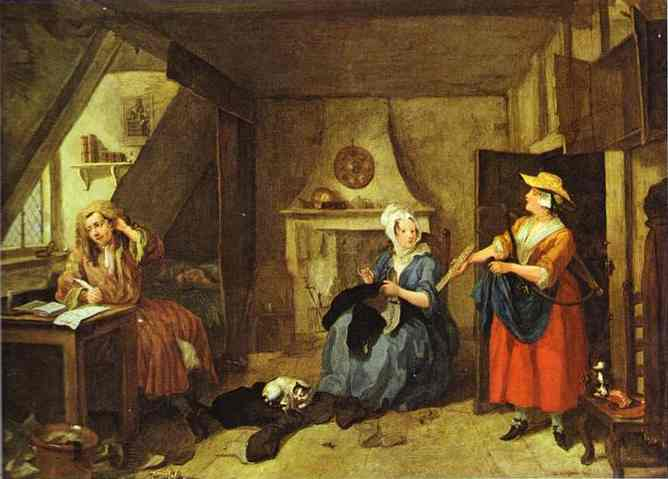
- Artist: William Hogarth
- Year: c. 1736
- Medium: Oil-on-canvas
- Dimensions: 65.9 cm × 79.1 cm (36 in × 31 1/8 in)
- Location: Birmingham Museum & Art Gallery, Birmingham

The Distrest Poet is an oil painting produced sometime around 1736 by the British artist William Hogarth. Reproduced as an etching and engraving, it was published in 1741 from a third state plate produced in 1740. The scene was probably inspired by Alexander Pope's satirical poem The Dunciad. It depicts a scene in a small, dingy attic room where a poet sits at his desk in the dormer and, scratching his head, stares at the papers on the desk before him, evidently looking for inspiration to complete the poem he is writing. Near him sits his wife darning clothes, surprised by the entrance of a milkmaid, who impatiently demands payment of debts.

== Background ==
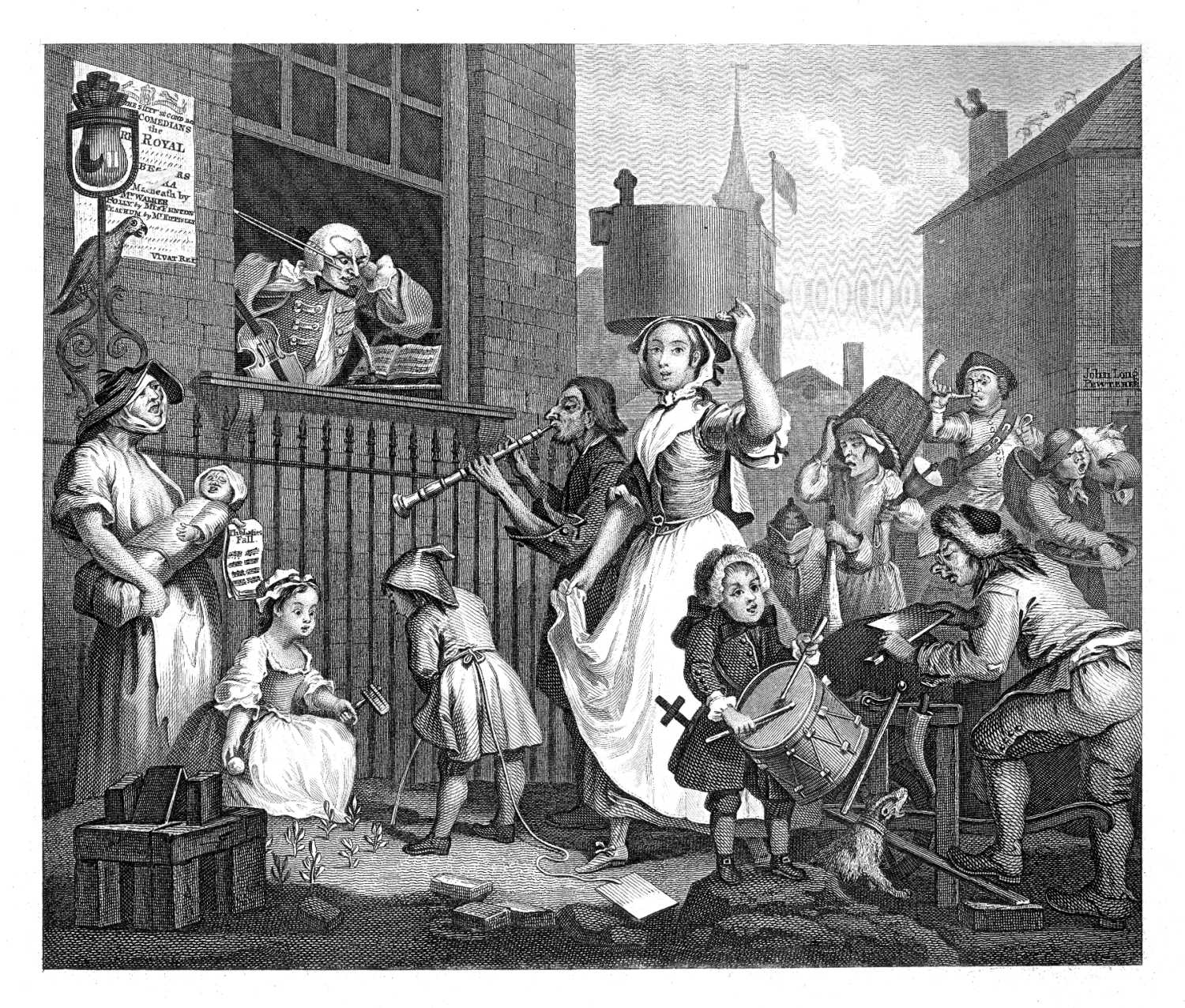
The Enraged Musician.

The engraving of The Distrest Poet in its third state was issued on 15 December 1741 as a companion piece to The Enraged Musician, a comic scene of a violinist driven to distraction by the noise from the street outside his practice room. The initial plate for The Distrest Poet was produced soon after Hogarth had completed the oil painting, but the third state plate was not completed until late in 1740 at which time Hogarth advertised his intention to issue a three-image set: The Provok'd Musician, The Distrest Poet, and a third image on the subject of "Painting". The Provok'd Musician (renamed The Enraged Musician) was produced in 1741 but the third image was never completed.

== Picture ==
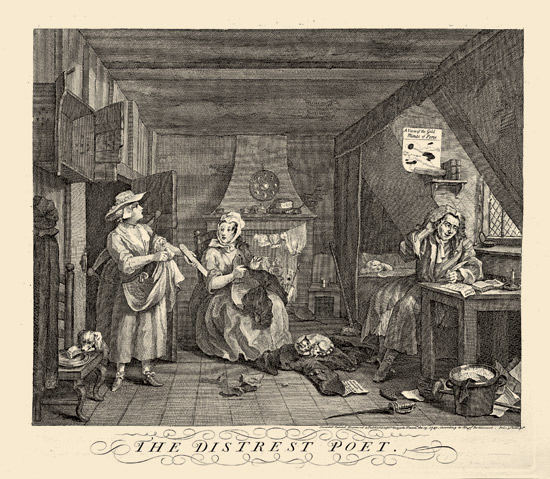
The third state print, completed in 1740 and issued in 1741, featured a different bill above the poet's head.

The scene is set in a small and messy garret, sparsely furnished by a few pieces of crude furniture. The room is poorly kept, with cracking plaster, a broken window and uneven floor, and a bare cupboard. In this way, Hogarth underlines the desperate circumstances of the occupants and the poverty of the family.

Starved of inspiration and suffering writer's block, the poet sits on the end of his bed in his night gown, quill in hand, scratching his head. A copy of Edward Bysshe's The Art of English Poetry, a guide to composition published in 1702, lies open on the table. A copy of Pope's satirical Grub Street Journal lies on the floor near his feet.

A few feet to his right sits his wife, darning the clothes on her lap and those sprawled on the floor, where a cat sits, while a crying infant, who is upset and hungry, goes unattended in the only bed. Next to the poet's wife, by the open door, an angry milkmaid presents her substantial bill, demanding payment for milk, underlining the poet's refusal to provide for his family by getting himself a proper job. The cupboard stands open and empty, save for a mouse; near the door, a dog steals the last of the family's food from a plate.

Other, less obvious, elements of the painting reveal more about the poet's personality and ideas. The poem he is attempting to write is entitled "Upon Riches", which suggests that the poet lives in a fantasy world, while his wife and child go hungry. Ned Ward's first published poem in 1691 was The Poet's Ramble After Riches, which satirised his own struggles as an impoverished aspiring poet, and Hogarth may have had this in mind when he produced the picture. Earlier impressions showed the poem as "Poverty, A Poem", which hinted at a connection to Theobald who had written "The Cave of Poverty, A Poem, Written in Imitation of Shakespeare" in 1714. The poet's dreams of riches are further suggested by the map that hangs over his head, entitled "A View of the Gold Mines of Peru", replacing the image of Pope that appears in the earlier states of the print. The poet's self-interest is hinted by the presence of his pipe and tobacco on the window sill, the mug of beer sitting on the chair in the back of the room, the lace cuffs drying by the fire, his ill-fitting wig, and gentleman's sword lying at his feet; it may be that despite his family's circumstances, he refuses to forgo his own personal pleasures and effects. Alternatively, his fantasy of earning a fortune from his art may require that he keeps his gentlemanly accoutrements around him, as they will be required when his fantasies are realized.

=== Alexander Pope ===
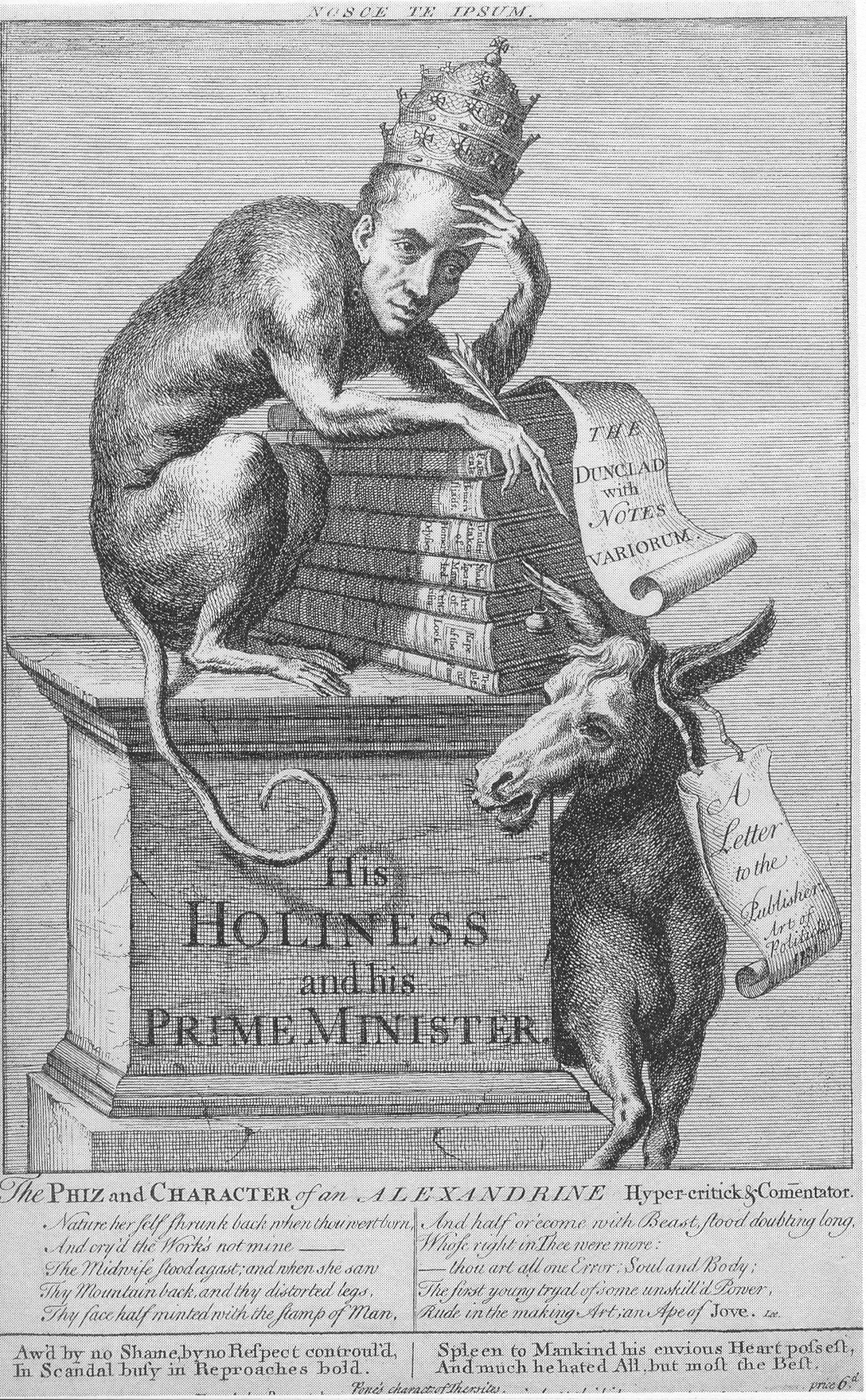
Hogarth reproduced this image of "Pope Alexander" in the painting, but whether his intention was to mock Pope or Pope's opponents is unclear. By the time the print was issued, the image of Pope had been removed.

The scene shown in The Distrest Poet was probably inspired by Alexander Pope's satirical poem The Dunciad, most likely by the prefatory matter of the second version, the Dunciad Variorum, which had been published in 1735 and in which Pope confirmed his authorship of the original. The painting and early states of the print included a quotation from Pope's work:

Studious he sate, with all his books around,

Sinking from thought to thought, a vast profound:
Plunged for his sense, but found no bottom there;

Then wrote and flounder'd on, in mere despair.

The bill stuck to the wall above the poet's head originally featured a reference to Pope in which he was punningly mocked as "His Holiness Pope Alexander", depicted as a rat wearing a papal tiara with an ass as his Prime Minister. The initial states of the print kept the quotation but replaced the genuine bill with a representation (which appears to have been entirely invented by Hogarth rather than copied from a real bill) of Pope clashing with Edmund Curll over the unauthorised publication of the poet's correspondence. Although Hogarth and Pope had never met, this literary inspiration led to speculation as to the identity of Hogarth's poet as one of the targets of Pope's satire. Ned Ward, the author of The London Spy was a strong contender, as was Lewis Theobald, to whom the lines quoted from Pope in Hogarth's original print referred.

How far Hogarth sympathised with Pope is questionable. The original bill mocked him, but it featured in an image that, at the least, poked fun at the poor poet who was the subject. Hogarth may have been suggesting either that poet was showing contempt for Pope or that he placed Pope's image above his head as a model to which to aspire. In the second image, which shows Pope and Curll locked in battle, it is not clear who has the upper hand, and by the time the print was issued the direct reference to Pope had been removed completely. Ronald Paulson, the preeminent modern authority on Hogarth, suggests that Hogarth would have viewed Pope, through his Roman Catholicism, as having been implicitly tied to the continental influences that Hogarth despised, and would have seen Pope's refusal to accept the patronage of the great men of the time, while still cultivating them as friends and still reaping the rewards they had to offer, as hypocritical. Pope was part of the circle that included William Kent and Richard Boyle, 3rd Earl of Burlington who had displaced Hogarth's father-in-law James Thornhill from commissions, and Hogarth also had ties to Lewis Theobald, a possible target of the satire, through illustrations he had produced for Theobald's Perseus and Andromeda, and through his subscription to Theobald's edition of the works of Shakespeare. Paulson suggests that the real "villain" of The Distrest Poet may be Pope, unseen but representing the successful "Great Poet" whom the deluded aspiring artist hopes to emulate, rather than the distressed poet himself. Hogarth had featured Pope picking John Gay's pocket in the foreground of Emblematical Print on the South Sea Scheme, an early print he had produced on the theme of the South Sea Bubble (both Pope and Gay had invested money in the scheme). At the same time, within the satire of the painting, the poet who is distressed is going to be one of Pope's dunces.

The lines by Pope, though referring to Theobald, the hero of The Dunciad, are a characterisation of a Grub Street hack, a stereotype popular in the 1730s denoting a man of limited writing ability who lived in poverty but nevertheless determinedly pursued a career in literature; therefore, the particular scribbler depicted in the painting would be one of this fraternity of "witlings" who banded together to protest Pope's poem. In this context it would make sense, therefore, for the poet to have the scabrous anti-Pope print, or an emblem of Pope's fight with the hack writers' patron, above him. Just as Moll Hackabout has a picture of Macheath on her wall in A Harlot's Progress, this aspiring and witless poet would have a picture of his hero, Edmund Curll, and an anti-Pope print. The emblem, in other words, identifies the poet's "side" in the battle between dunces and men of wit.

Hogarth was well acquainted with the struggles of the Grub Street hack though, through the travails of his own father, Richard, who had been unable to make a living as writer and had eventually ended up at the Fleet Prison as a bankrupt. Hogarth may have been more than sympathetic to the dunce struggling with his rhymes. Jenny Uglow in her biography of Hogarth, posits that the gradual alteration of the prints above the poet's head could suggest a slow softening of attitudes towards Pope and his attack on the class of writer to which Hogarth's father had belonged, and perhaps evidence of Hogarth making his own compromises in his endeavours to become successful.

== See also ==
- List of works by William Hogarth
