= Four Times of the Day =

Series of four paintings by William Hogarth

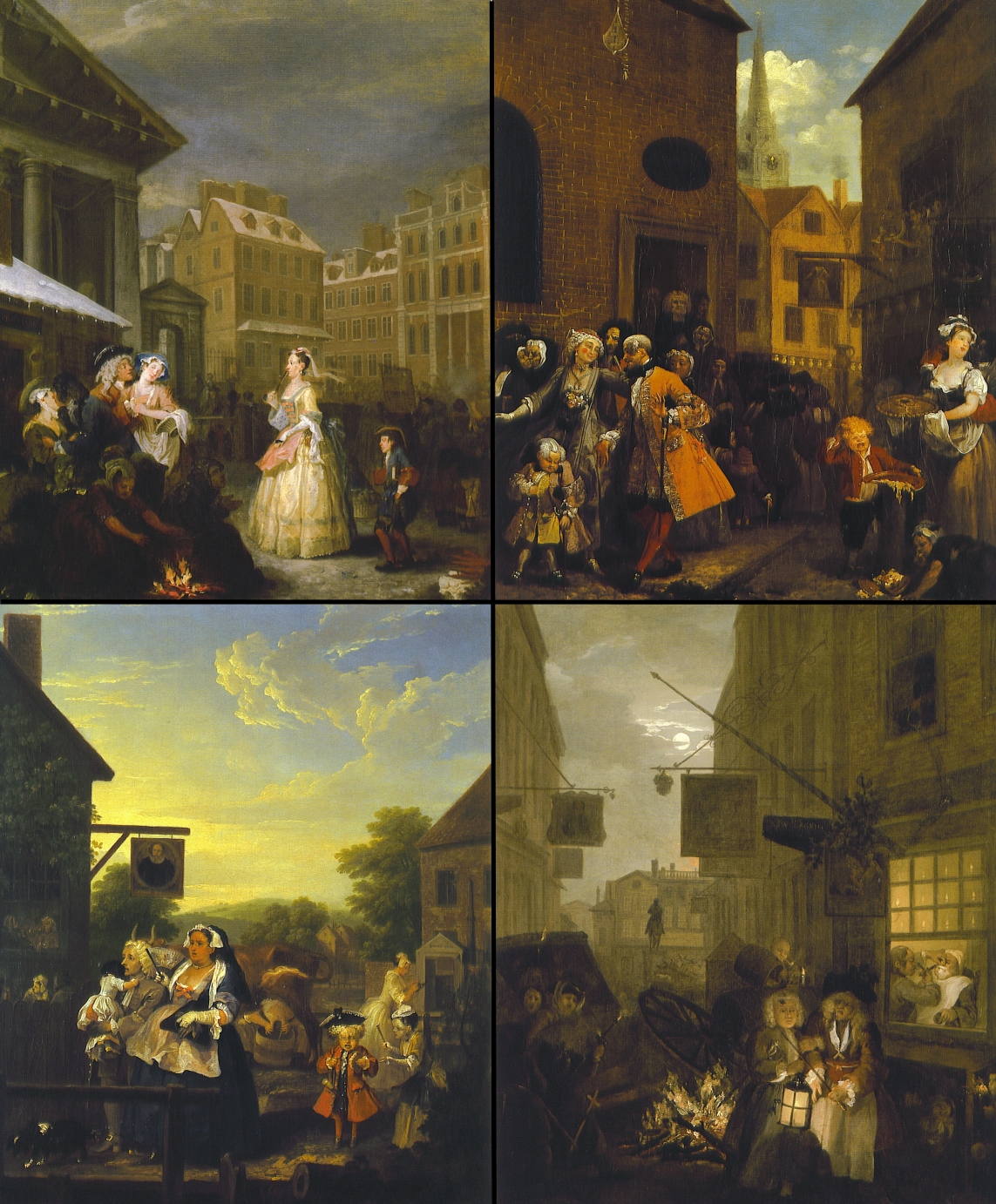
The paintings of Four Times of the Day (clockwise from top left: Morning, Noon, Night, and Evening)

Four Times of the Day is a series of four oil paintings by English artist William Hogarth. They were completed in 1736 and in 1738 were reproduced and published as a series of four engravings. They are humorous depictions of life in the streets of London, the vagaries of fashion, and the interactions between the rich and poor. Unlike many of Hogarth's other series, such as A Harlot's Progress, A Rake's Progress, Industry and Idleness, and The Four Stages of Cruelty, it does not depict the story of an individual, but instead focuses on the society of the city in a satirical manner.

Hogarth does not offer a judgment on the activities occurring in each scene, but rather acts as a detached observer. In each scene, while the upper and middle classes tend to provide the focus, there are fewer moral comparisons than seen in some of his other works. Their dimensions are about 74 cm (29 in) by 61 cm (24 in) each.

The four pictures depict scenes of daily life in various locations in London as the day progresses. Morning shows a prudish spinster making her way to church in Covent Garden past the revellers of the previous night. Noon shows two cultures on opposite sides of the street in St Giles. Evening shows a dyer's family returning hot and bothered from a trip to Sadler's Wells. Night shows disreputable goings-on around a drunken freemason staggering home near Charing Cross.

== Background ==
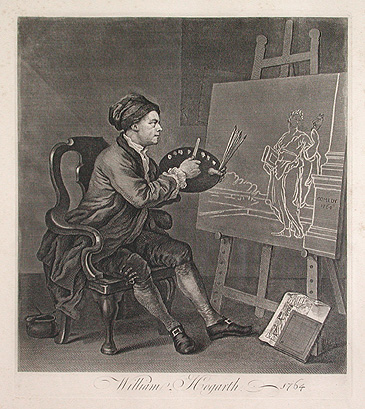
William Hogarth, Self Portrait, 1758

Four Times of the Day was the first set of prints that Hogarth published after his two great successes, A Harlot's Progress (1732) and A Rake's Progress (1735). It was among the first of his prints to be published after the Engraving Copyright Act 1734, which Hogarth had helped push through Parliament. A Rake's Progress had taken early advantage of the protection afforded by the new law. Unlike Harlot and Rake, the four prints in Times of the Day do not form a consecutive narrative, and none of the characters appears in more than one scene. Hogarth conceived of the series as "representing in a humorous manner, morning, noon, evening and night".

Hogarth took his inspiration for the series from the classical satires of Horace and Juvenal, via their Augustan counterparts, particularly John Gay's Trivia and Jonathan Swift's "A Description of a City Shower" and "A Description of the Morning". He took his artistic models from other series of the "Times of Day", "The Seasons" and "Ages of Man", such as those by Nicolas Poussin and Nicolas Lancret, and from pastoral scenes, but executed them with a twist by transferring them to the city.

He also drew on the Flemish "Times of Day" style known as points du jour, in which the gods floated above pastoral scenes of idealised shepherds and shepherdesses. In Hogarth's works, it may be argued that the gods were recast as his central characters: the churchgoing lady, a frosty Aurora in Morning; the pie-girl, a pretty London Venus in Noon; the pregnant woman, a sweaty Diana in Evening; and the freemason, a drunken Pluto in Night.

Hogarth designed the series for an original commission by Jonathan Tyers in 1736 in which he requested a number of paintings to decorate supper boxes at Vauxhall Gardens. Hogarth is believed to have suggested to Tyers that the supper boxes at Gardens be decorated with paintings as part of their refurbishment. Among the works featured when the renovation was completed was Hogarth's picture of Henry VIII and Anne Boleyn. The originals of Four Times of the Day were sold to other collectors. The scenes were reproduced at Vauxhall by Francis Hayman, and two of them, Evening and Night, hung at the pleasure gardens until at least 1782.

The engravings are mirror images of the paintings, since the engraved plates are copied from the paintings the image is reversed when printed, which leads to problems ascertaining the times shown on the clocks in some of the scenes. The images are sometimes seen as parodies of middle class life in London at the time. The moral judgements are not as harsh as in some of Hogarth's other works and the lower classes do not escape ridicule either. Often the theme is one of over-orderliness versus chaos. The four plates depict four times of day. They also move through the seasons: Morning is set in winter, Noon in spring, and Evening in summer. Night—sometimes misidentified as being in September—takes place on Oak Apple Day in May rather than in the autumn.

Evening was engraved by Bernard Baron, a French engraver who was living in London. Although the designs are Hogarth's, it is not known whether he engraved any of the four plates himself. The prints, along with a fifth picture, Strolling Actresses Dressing in a Barn from 1738, were sold by subscription for one guinea (£212.00 in 2025), half payable on ordering and half on delivery. After subscription the price rose to five shillings per print (£50.00 in 2025), making the five print set four shillings dearer overall.

Although Strolling Actresses Dressing in a Barn was not directly connected to the other prints, it seems that Hogarth always envisaged selling the five prints together, adding the Strolling Actresses as a complementary theme, just as he had added Southwark Fair to the subscription for The Rake's Progress. Whereas the characters in Four Times play their roles without being conscious of acting, the company of Strolling Actresses are fully aware of the differences between the reality of their lives and the roles they are set to play. Representations of Aurora and Diana appear in both.

Hogarth advertised the prints for sale in May 1737, again in January 1738, and announced the plates were ready on 26 April 1738. The paintings were sold individually at an auction on 25 January 1745, along with the original paintings for A Harlot's Progress, A Rake's Progress and Strolling Actresses Dressing in a Barn. Sir William Heathcote purchased Morning and Night for 20 guineas and £20 6s respectively (£ 4,300 and £ 4,200 in 2025). The Duke of Ancaster bought Noon for £38 17s (£ 8,000 in 2025) and Evening for £39 18s (£ 8,200 in 2025). A further preliminary sketch for Morning with some differences to the final painting was sold in a later auction for £21 (£ 4,300 in 2025).

== Series ==
=== Morning ===
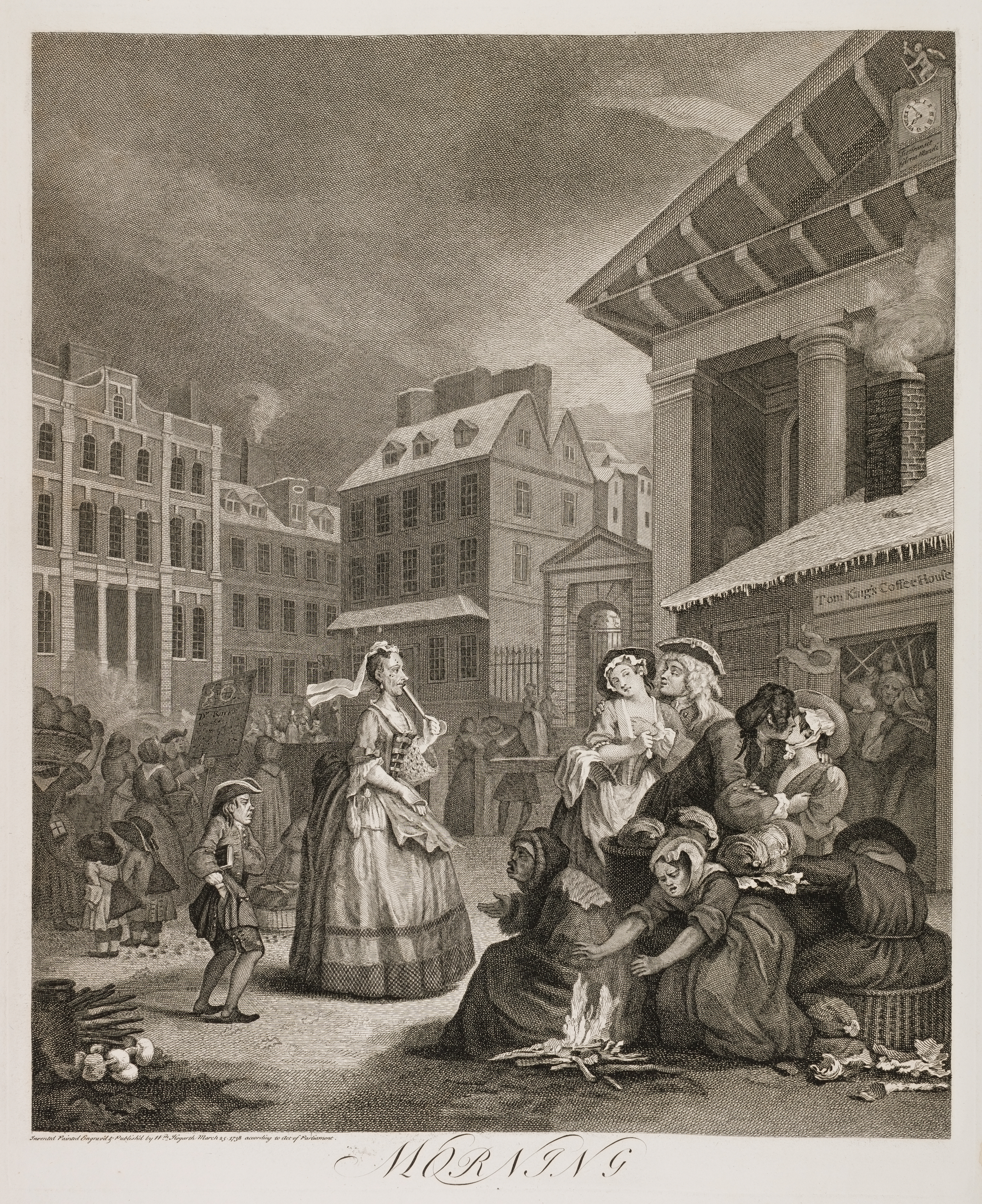
Morning (Plate I)

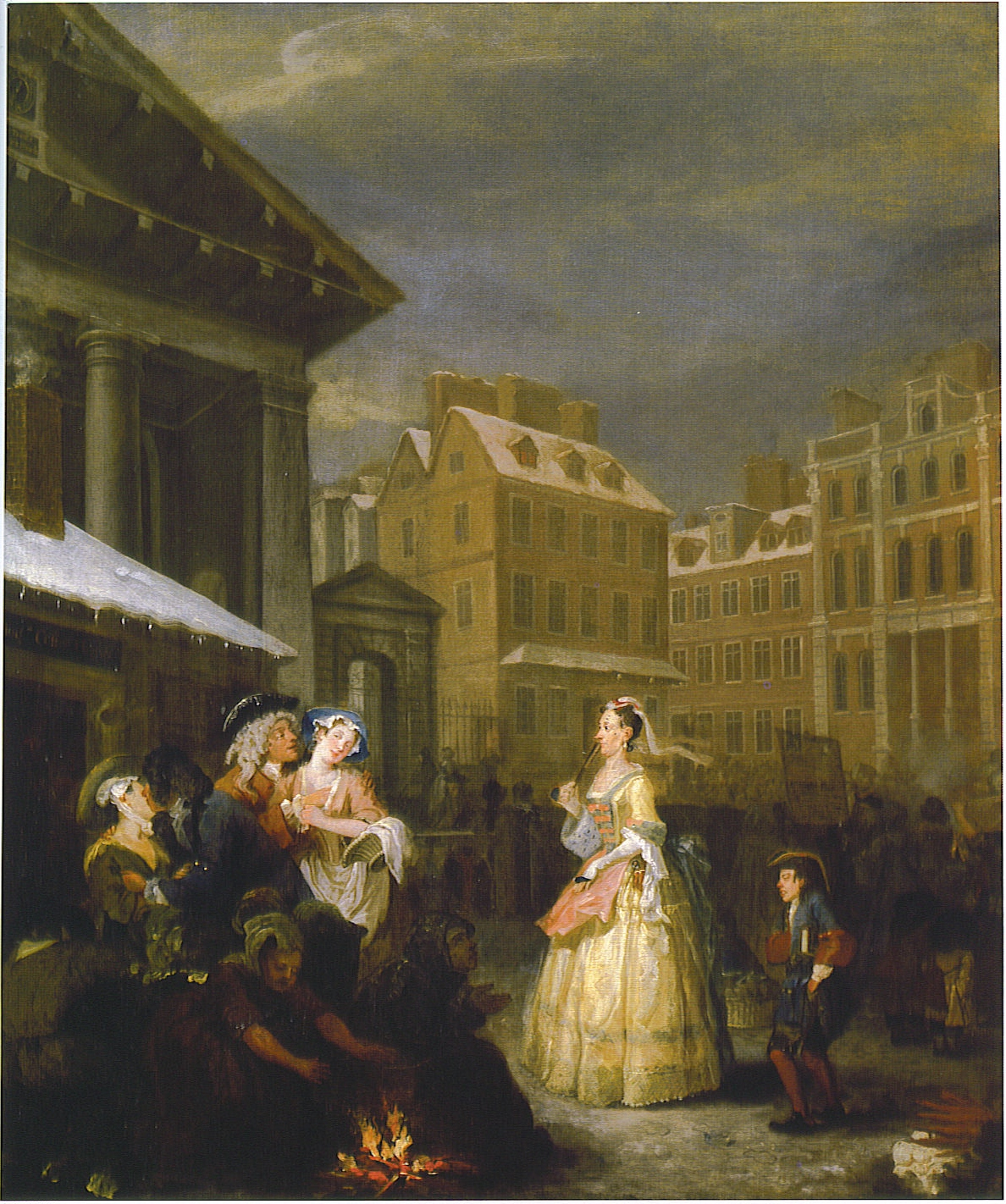
Morning (Painting I). 73.7 cm × 61.0 cm (29 × 24 in). Oil on canvas.

In Morning, a lady makes her way to church, shielding herself with her fan from the shocking view of two men pawing at the market girls. The scene is the west side of the piazza at Covent Garden, indicated by a part of the Palladian portico of Inigo Jones's Church of St Paul visible behind Tom King's Coffee House, a notorious venue celebrated in pamphlets of the time. Henry Fielding mentions the coffee house in both The Covent Garden Tragedy and Pasquin. At the time Hogarth produced this picture, the coffee house was being run by Tom's widow, Moll King, but its reputation had not diminished. Moll opened the doors once those of the taverns had shut, allowing the revellers to continue enjoying themselves from midnight until dawn. The mansion with columned portico visible in the centre of the picture, No. 43 King Street, is attributed to architect Thomas Archer (later 1st Baron Archer) and occupied by him at the date of Hogarth's works. It was situated on the north side of the piazza, while the coffee house was on the south side, as depicted in Hogarth's original painting. In the picture, it is early morning and some revellers are ending their evening: a fight has broken out in the coffee house and, in the melée, a wig flies out of the door. Meanwhile, stallholders set out their fruit and vegetables for the day's market. Two children who should be making their way to school have stopped, entranced by the activity of the market, in a direct reference to Swift's A Description of the Morning in which children "lag with satchels in their hands". Above the clock is Father Time and below it the inscription Sic transit gloria mundi.^{[a]} The smoke rising from the chimney of the coffee house connects these portents to the scene below.

Hogarth replicates all the features of the pastoral scene in an urban landscape. The shepherds and shepherdesses become the beggars and prostitutes, the sun overhead is replaced by the clock on the church, the snow-capped mountains become the snowy rooftops. Even the setting of Covent Garden with piles of fruit and vegetables echoes the country scene. In the centre of the picture the icy goddess of the dawn in the form of the prim churchgoer is followed by her shivering red-nosed pageboy, mirroring Hesperus, the dawn bearer. The woman is the only one who seems unaffected by the cold, suggesting it may be her element. Although outwardly shocked, the dress of the woman, which is too fashionable for a woman of her age and in the painting is shown to be a striking acid yellow, may suggest she has other thoughts on her mind. She is commonly described as a spinster, and considered to be a hypocrite, ostentatiously attending church and carrying a fashionable ermine muff while displaying no charity to her freezing footboy or the half-seen beggar before her. The figure of the spinster is said to be based on a relative of Hogarth, who, recognising herself in the picture, cut him out of her will. Fielding later used the woman as the model for his character of Bridget Allworthy in Tom Jones.

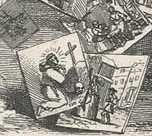
The spinster is assaulted by St. Francis in Battle of the Pictures.

A trail of peculiar footprints shows the path trodden by the woman on her pattens to avoid putting her good shoes in the snow and filth of the street. A small object hangs at her side, interpreted variously as a nutcracker or a pair of scissors in the form of a skeleton or a miniature portrait, hinting, perhaps, at a romantic disappointment. Although clearly a portrait in the painting, the object is indistinct in the prints from the engraving. Other parts of the scene are clearer in the print, however: in the background, a quack is selling his cureall medicine, and while in the painting the advertising board is little more than a transparent outline, in the print, Dr. Rock's name can be discerned inscribed on the board below the royal crest which suggests his medicine is produced by royal appointment. The salesman may be Rock himself. Hogarth's opinion of Rock is made clear in the penultimate plate of A Harlot's Progress where he is seen arguing over treatments with Dr Misaubin while Moll Hackabout dies unattended in the corner.

Hogarth revisited Morning in his bidding ticket, Battle of the Pictures, for the auction of his works, held in 1745. In this, his own paintings are pictured being attacked by ranks of Old Masters; Morning is stabbed by a work featuring St. Francis as Hogarth contrasts the false piety of the prudish spinster with the genuine piety of the Catholic saint.^{[b]}

=== Noon ===
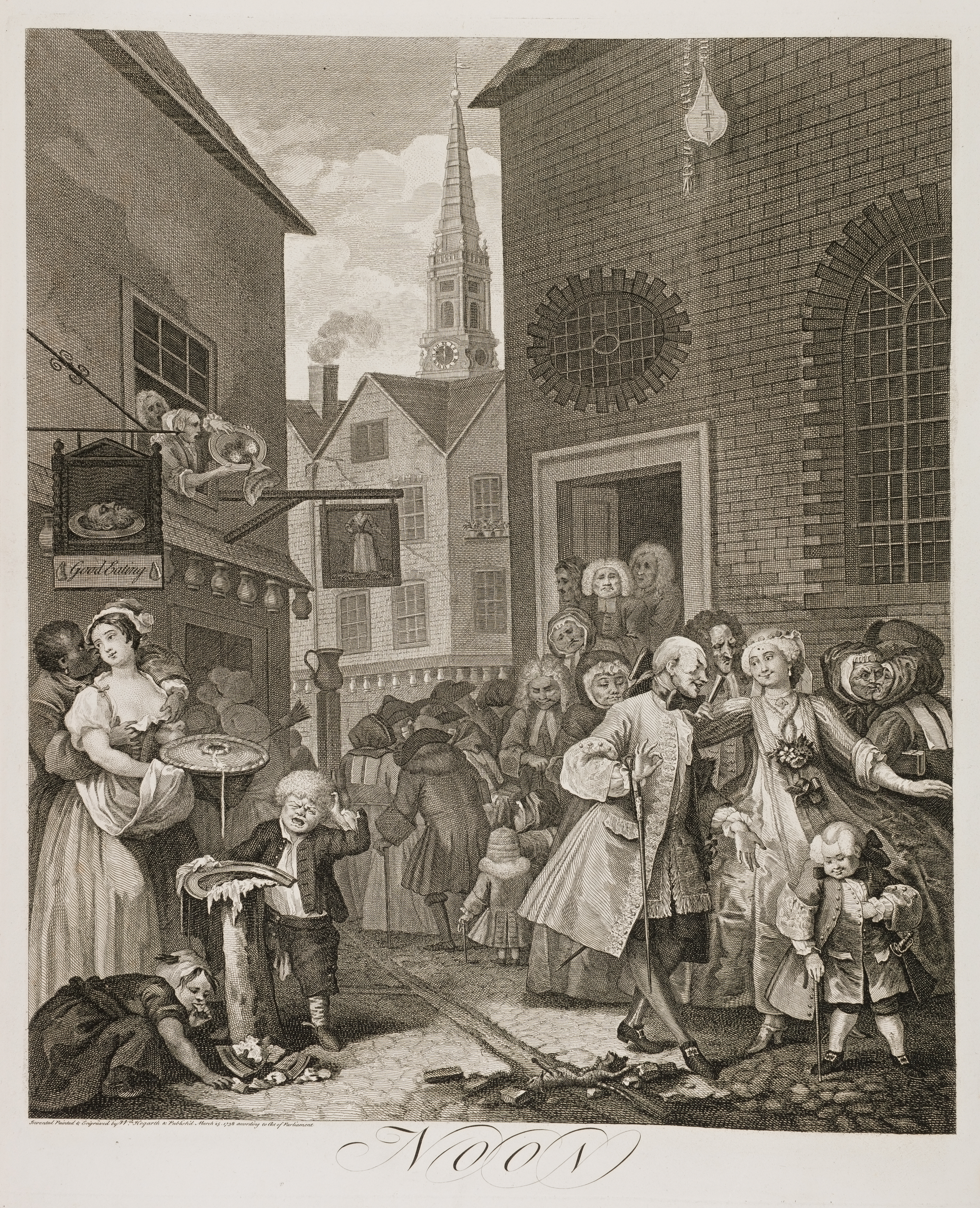
Noon (Plate II)

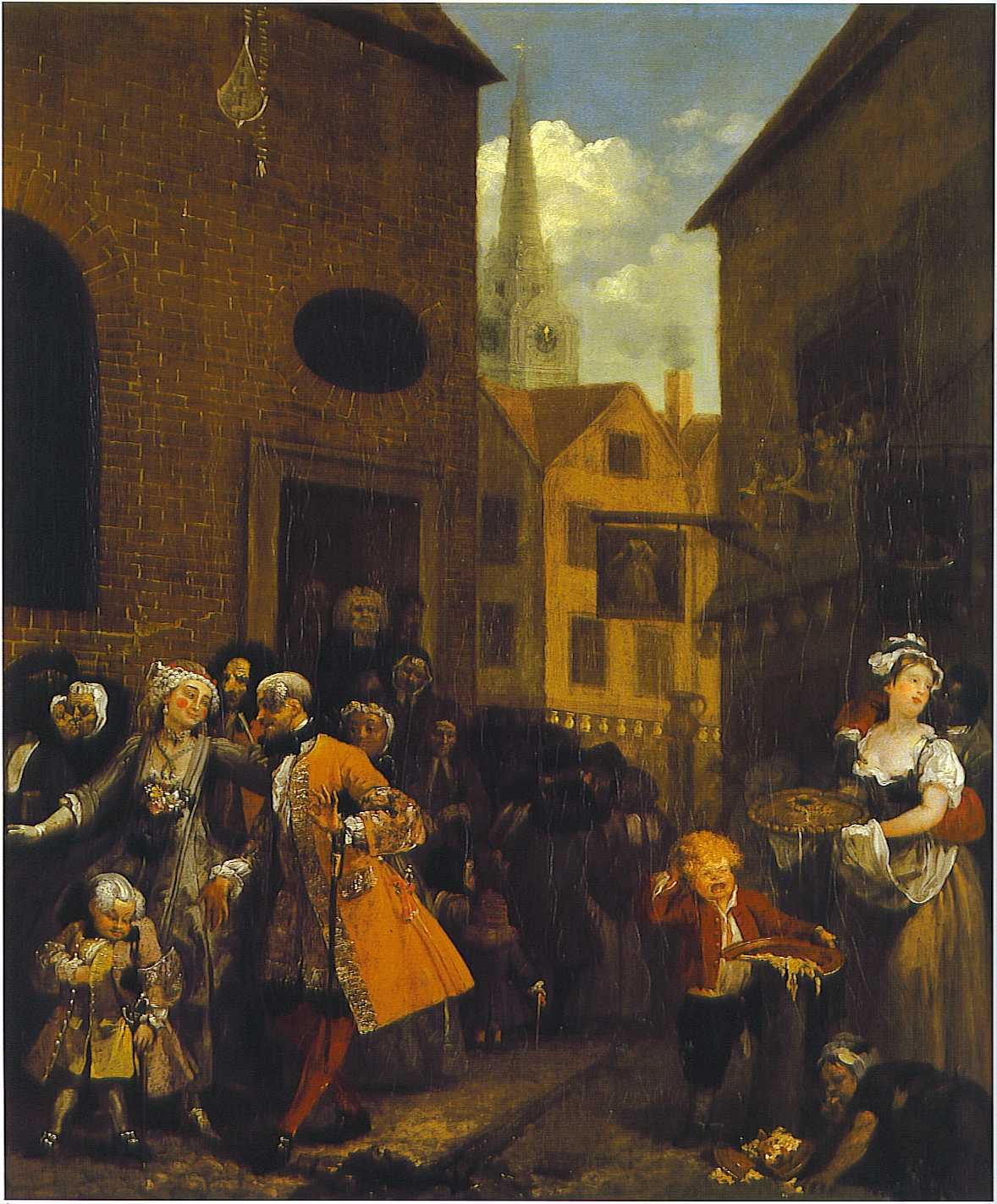
Noon (Painting II)

The scene takes place in Hog Lane, part of the slum district of St Giles with the church of St Giles in the Fields in the background. Hogarth would feature St Giles again as the background of Gin Lane and First Stage of Cruelty. The picture shows Huguenots leaving the French Church in what is now Soho (or perhaps the Huguenot Chapel on West Street, St Giles). The Huguenot refugees had arrived in the 1680s and established themselves as tradesmen and artisans, particularly in the silk trade; and the French Church was their first place of worship. Hogarth contrasts their fussiness and high fashion with the slovenliness of the group on the other side of the road; the rotting corpse of a cat that has been stoned to death lying in the gutter that divides the street is the only thing the two sides have in common.^{[c]} The older members of the congregation wear traditional dress, while the younger members wear the fashions of the day. The children are dressed up as adults: the boy in the foreground struts around in his finery while the boy with his back to the viewer has his hair in a net, bagged up in the "French" style.

At the far right, a black man fondles the breasts of a woman, distracting her from her work, her pie-dish "tottering like her virtue". Confusion over whether the law permitted slavery in England, and pressure from abolitionists, meant that by the mid-eighteenth century there was a sizeable population of free black Londoners; but the status of this man is not clear. The black man, the girl and bawling boy fill the roles of Mars, Venus and Cupid which would have appeared in the pastoral scenes that Hogarth is aping. In front of the couple, a boy has set down his pie to rest, but the plate has broken, spilling the pie onto the ground where it is being rapidly consumed by an urchin. The boy's features are modelled on those of a child in the foreground of Poussin's first version of The Abduction of the Sabine Women (now held in the Metropolitan Museum of Art).

The crying boy in Hogarth's work is based on this infant in the foreground of Poussin's first rendition of the Rape of the Sabine Women.

The composition of the scene juxtaposes the prim and proper Huguenot man and his immaculately dressed wife and son with these three, as they form their own "family group" across the other side of the gutter. The head of John the Baptist on a platter is the advertisement for the pie shop, proclaiming "Good eating". Below this sign are the embracing couple, extending the metaphor of good eating beyond a mere plate of food, and still further down the street girl greedily scoops up the pie, carrying the theme to the foot of the picture. I. R. F. Gordon sees the vertical line of toppling plates from the top window downwards as a symbol of the disorder on this side of the street. The man reduced to a head on the sign, in what is assumed to be the woman's fantasy, is mirrored by the "Good Woman" pictured on the board behind who has only a body, her nagging head removed to create the man's ideal of a "good woman". In the top window of the "Good Woman", a woman throws a plate with a leg of meat into the street as she argues, providing a stark contrast to the "good" woman pictured on the sign below. Ronald Paulson sees the kite hanging from the church as part of a trinity of signs; the kite indicating the purpose of the church, ascent into heaven, just as the other signs for "Good Eating" and the "Good Woman" indicate the predilections of those on that side of the street. However, he also notes it as another nod to the pastoral tradition: here instead of soaring above the fields it hangs impotently on the church wall.

The time is unclear. Allan Cunningham states it is half past eleven, and suggests that Hogarth uses the early hour to highlight the debauchery occurring opposite the church, yet the print shows the hands at a time that could equally be half past twelve, and the painting shows a thin golden hand pointing to ten past twelve.

Understanding of Hogarth's intentions with this image is ambiguous, as the two sides of the street, one French the other English, seem equally satirised. In the early nineteenth century, Cooke and Davenport suggested that in this scene Hogarth's sympathies seem to be with the lower classes and more specifically with the English. Although there is disorder on the English side of the street, they suggested, there is an abundance of "good eating" and the characters are rosy-cheeked and well-nourished. Even the street girl can eat her fill. The pinch-faced Huguenots, on the other hand, have their customs and dress treated as mercilessly as any characters in the series. However, this might say more about the rise of English nationalism at the time when Cooke and Davenport were writing than Hogarth's actual intention. Hogarth mocked continental fashions again in Marriage à-la-mode (1743–1745) and made a more direct attack on the French in The Gate of Calais which he painted immediately upon returning to England in 1748 after he was arrested as a spy while sketching in Calais.

=== Evening ===
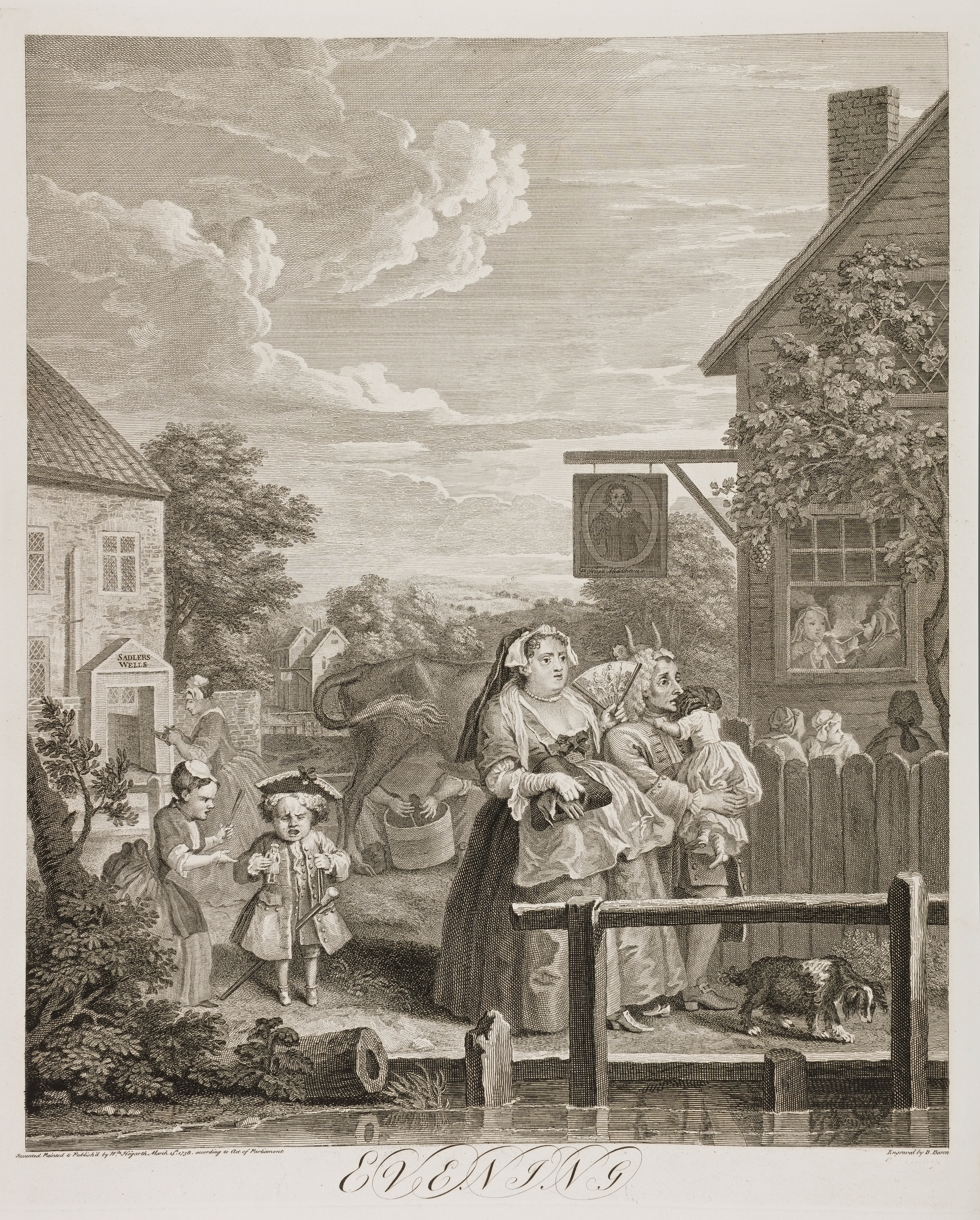
Evening (Plate III)

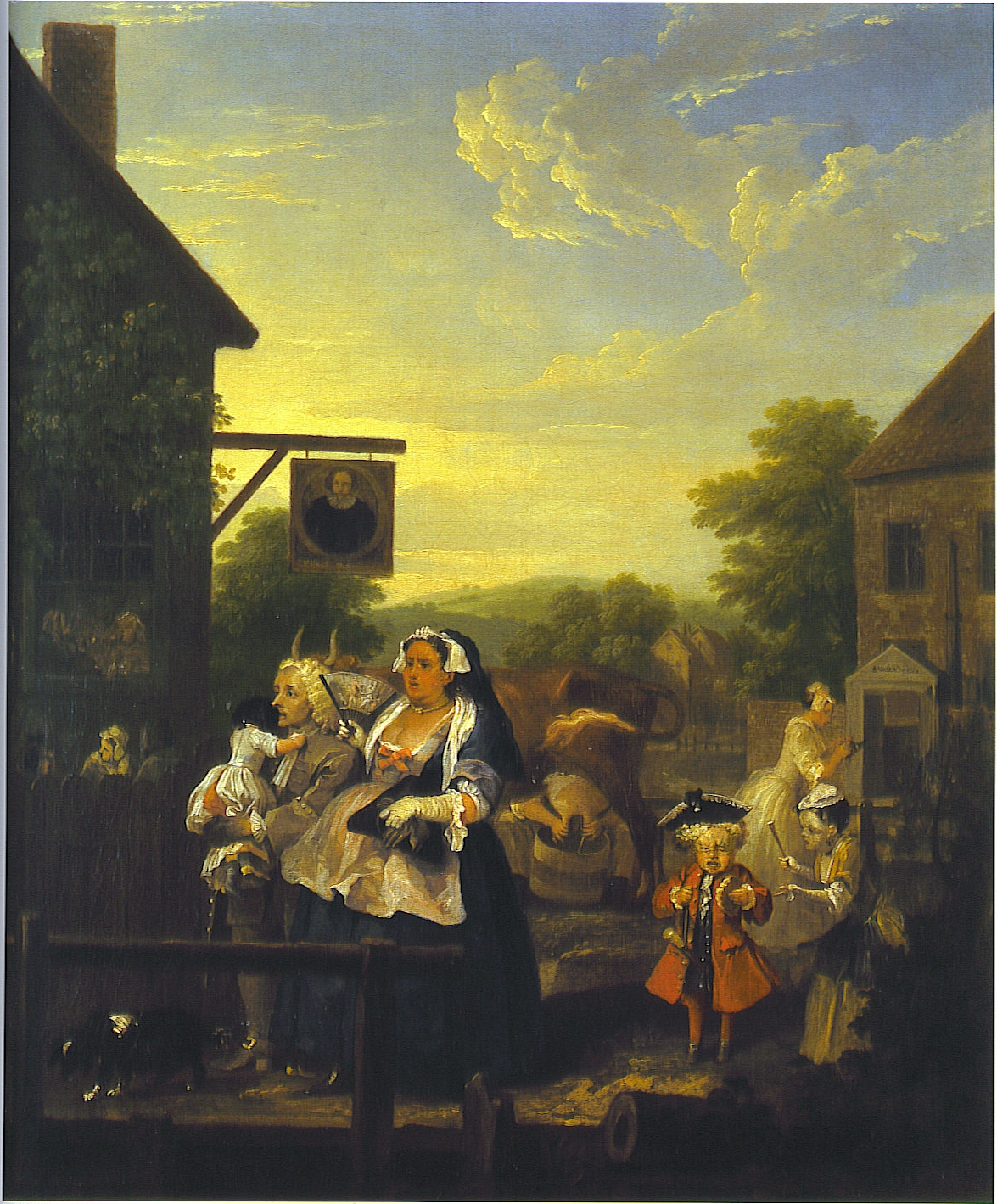
Evening (Painting III)

Unlike the other three images, Evening takes place slightly outside the built-up area of the city, with views of rolling hills and wide evening skies. The cow being milked in the background indicates it is around 5 o'clock. While in Morning winter cold pervades the scene, Evening is oppressed by the heat of the summer. A pregnant woman and her husband attempt to escape from the claustrophobic city by journeying out to the fashionable Sadler's Wells (the stone entrance to Sadler's Wells Theatre is shown to the left). By the time Hogarth produced this series the theatre had lost any vestiges of fashionability and was satirised as having an audience consisting of tradesmen and their pretentious wives. Ned Ward described the clientele in 1699 as:

Butchers and bailiffs, and such sort of fellows,
Mixed with a vermin train'd up for the gallows,
As Bullocks and files, housebreakers and padders,
With prize-fighters, sweetners, and such sort of traders,
Informers, thief-takers, deer stealers, and bullies.

The husband, whose stained hands reveal he is a dyer by trade, looks harried as he carries his exhausted youngest daughter. In earlier impressions (and the painting), his hands are blue, to show his occupation, while his wife's face is coloured with red ink. The placement of the cow's horns behind his head represents him as a cuckold and suggests the children are not his. Behind the couple, their children replay the scene: the father's cane protrudes between the son's legs, doubling as a hobby horse, while the daughter is clearly in charge, demanding that he hand over his gingerbread. A limited number of proofs missing the girl and artist's signature were printed; Hogarth added the mocking girl to explain the boy's tears.

The heat is made tangible by the flustered appearance of the woman as she fans herself (the fan itself displays a classical scene—perhaps Venus, Adonis and Cupid); the sluggish pregnant dog that looks longingly towards the water; and the vigorous vine growing on the side of the tavern. As is often the case in Hogarth's work, the dog's expression reflects that of its master. The family rush home, past the New River and a tavern with a sign showing Sir Hugh Myddleton, who nearly bankrupted himself financing the construction of the river to bring running water into London in 1613 (a wooden pipe lies by the side of the watercourse). Through the open window other refugees from the city can be seen sheltering from the oppressive heat in the bar. While they appear more jolly than the dyer and his family, Hogarth pokes fun at these people escaping to the country for fresh air only to reproduce the smoky air and crowded conditions of the city by huddling in the busy tavern with their pipes.

=== Night ===
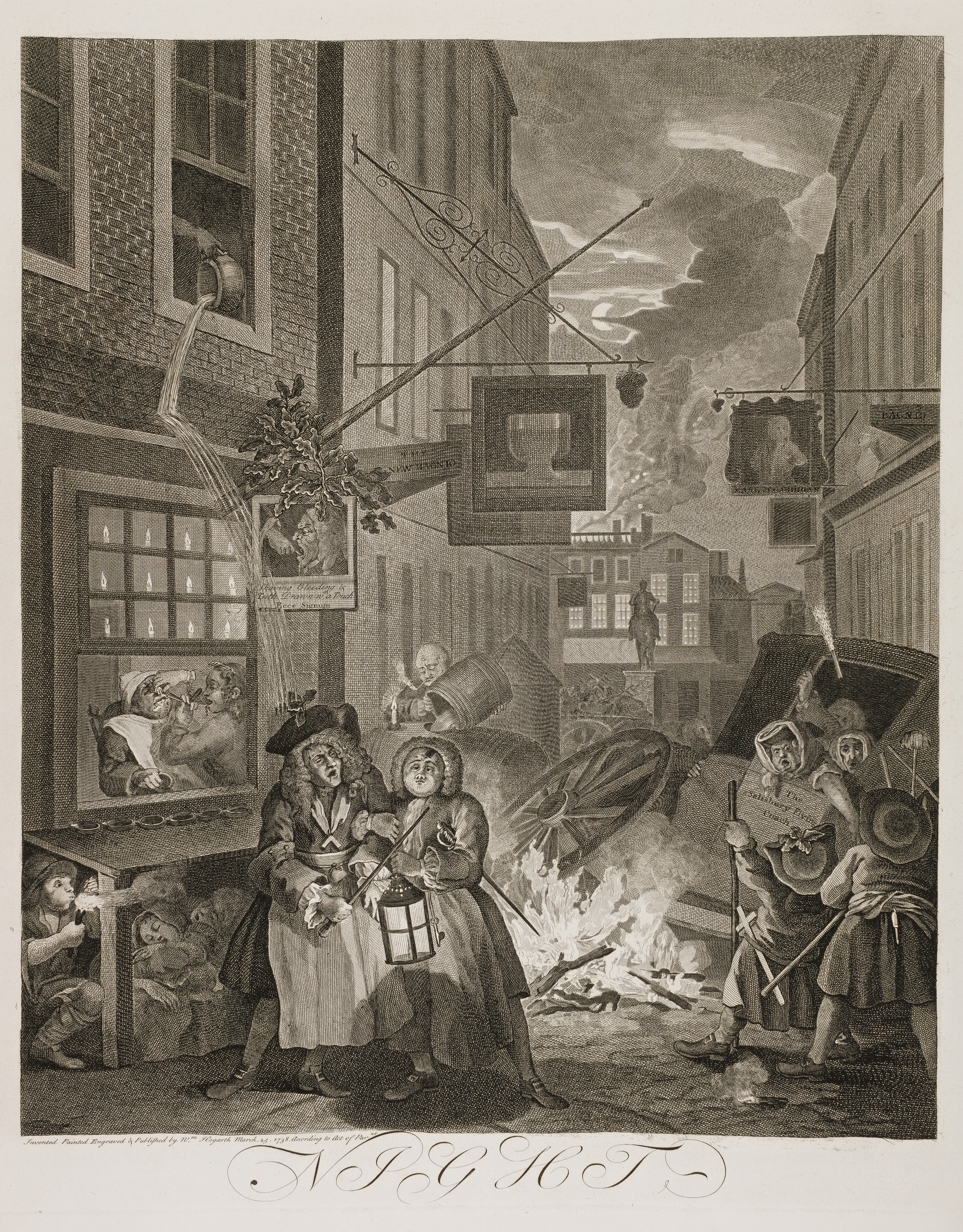
Night (Plate IV)

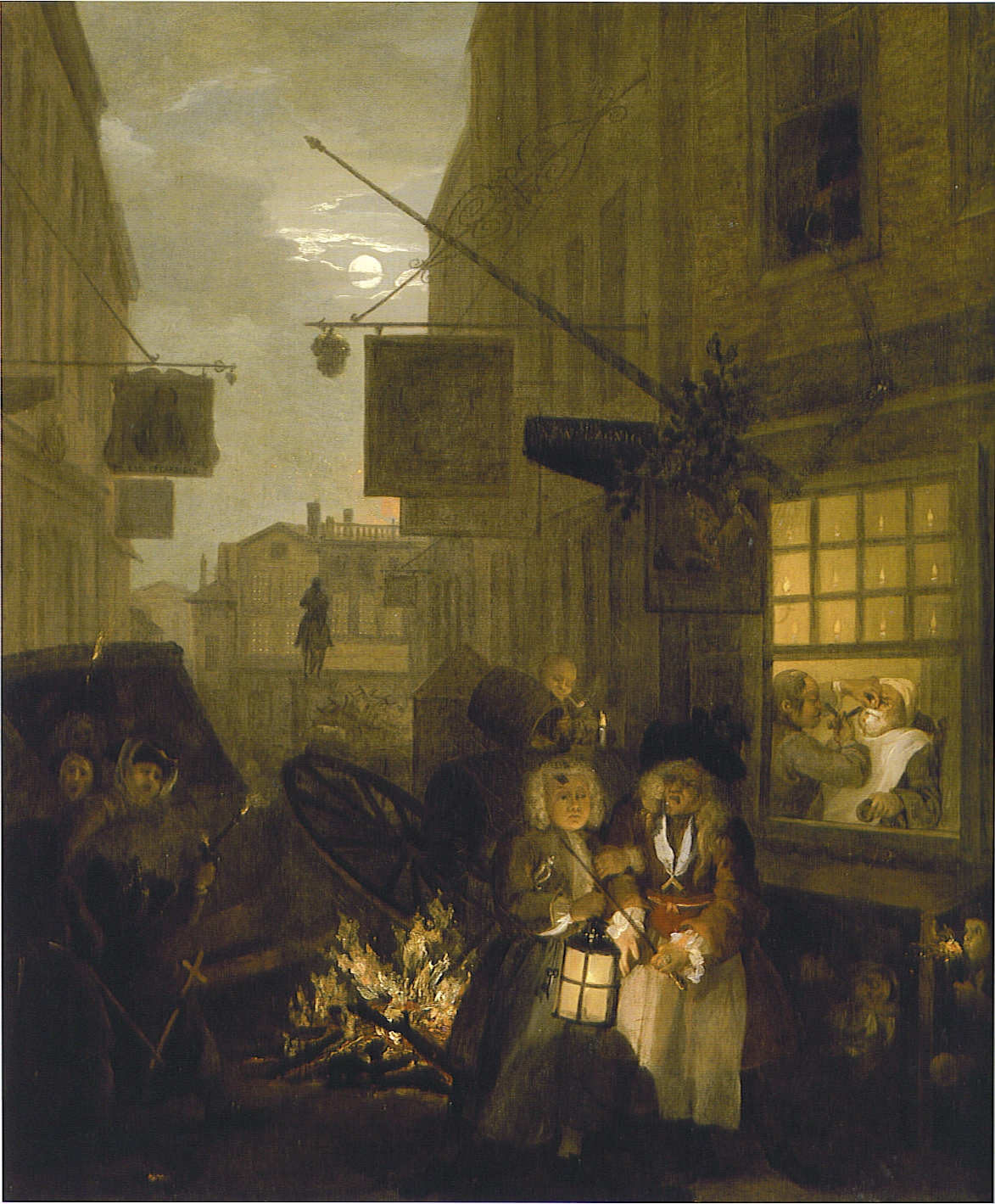
Night (Painting IV). 73.7 × 61.0 cm (29 × 24 in). Oil on canvas.

The final picture in the series, Night, shows disorderly activities under cover of night in the Charing Cross Road, identified by Hubert Le Sueur's equestrian statue of Charles I of England and the two pubs; this part of the road is now known as Whitehall. In the background the passing cartload of furniture suggests tenants escaping from their landlord in a "moonlight flit". In the painting the moon is full, but in the print it appears as a crescent.

Traditional scholarship has held that the night is 29 May, Oak Apple Day, a public holiday which celebrated the Restoration of the monarchy (demonstrated by the oak boughs above the barber's sign and on some of the subjects' hats, which recall the royal oak tree in which Charles II hid after losing the Battle of Worcester in 1651). Alternatively, Sean Shesgreen has suggested that the date is 3 September, commemorating the battle of Worcester itself, a dating that preserves the seasonal progression from winter to spring to summer to autumn.

Charing Cross was a central staging post for coaches, but the congested narrow road was a frequent scene of accidents; here, a bonfire has caused the Salisbury Flying Coach to overturn. Festive bonfires were usual but risky: a house fire lights the sky in the distance. A link-boy blows on the flame of his torch, street-urchins are playing with the fire, and one of their fireworks is falling in at the coach window.

On one side of the road is a barber surgeon whose sign advertises Shaving, bleeding, and teeth drawn with a touch. Ecce signum! Inside the shop, the barber, who may be drunk, haphazardly shaves a customer, holding his nose like that of a pig, while spots of blood darken the cloth under his chin. The surgeons and barbers had been a single profession since 1540 and would not finally separate until 1745, when the surgeons broke away to form the Company of Surgeons.

In the foreground, a drunken freemason, identified by his apron and set square medallion as the Worshipful Master of a lodge, is being helped home by his Tyler, as the contents of a chamber pot are emptied onto his head from a window. In some states of the print, a woman standing back from the window looks down on him, suggesting that his soaking is not accidental. The freemason is traditionally identified as Sir Thomas de Veil, who was a member of Hogarth's first Lodge, Henry Fielding's predecessor as the Bow Street magistrate, and the model for Fielding's character Justice Squeezum in The Coffee-House Politician (1730). He was unpopular for his stiff sentencing of gin-sellers, which was deemed to be hypocritical as he was known to be an enthusiastic drinker. He is supported by his Tyler, a servant equipped with sword and candle-snuffer, who may be Brother Montgomerie, the Grand Tyler.

All around are pubs and brothels. The Earl of Cardigan tavern is on one side of the street, and opposite is the Rummer, whose sign shows a rummer (a short wide-brimmed glass) with a bunch of grapes on the pole. Masonic lodges met in both taverns during the 1730s, and the Lodge at the Rummer and Grapes in nearby Channel Row was the smartest of the four founders of the Grand Lodge. The publican is adulterating a hogshead of wine, a practice recalled in the poetry of Matthew Prior who lived with his uncle Samuel Prior, the Landlord successively of both the Rummer and Grapes and the Rummer.

My uncle, rest his soul, when living,
Might have contriv'd me ways of thriving;
Taught me with cider to replenish
My vats, or ebbing tide of Rhenish.

On either side of the street are signs for The Bagnio and The New Bagnio. Ostensibly a Turkish bathhouse, bagnio had come to mean a disorderly house.

The 6th Earl of Salisbury scandalised society by driving and upsetting a stagecoach. John Ireland suggests that the overturned "Salisbury Flying Coach" below the "Earl of Cardigan" sign was a gentle mockery of the Grand Master 4th Earl of Cardigan, George Brudenell, later Duke of Montagu, who was also renowned for his reckless carriage driving. It also mirrors the ending of Gay's Trivia in which the coach is overturned and wrecked at night.

== Reception ==
Four Times of the Day was the first series of prints that Hogarth had issued since the success of the Harlot and Rake, and was the only set he issued until Marriage à-la-mode in 1745, so it was eagerly anticipated. On hearing of its imminent issue, George Faulkner wrote from Dublin that he would take 50 sets. The series lacks the moral lessons that are found in the earlier series and revisited in Marriage à-la-mode, and its lack of teeth meant it failed to achieve the same success, though it has found an enduring niche as a snapshot of the society of Hogarth's time.

At the auction of 1745, the paintings of Four Times of the Day raised more than those of the Rake. Night, which is generally regarded as the worst of the series, fetched the highest single total. Cunningham commented sarcastically: "Such was the reward then, to which the patrons of genius thought these works entitled". While Horace Walpole praised the accompanying print, Strolling Actresses Dressing in a Barn, as being the finest of Hogarth's works, he had little to say of Four Times of the Day, other than that it did not find itself wanting in comparison with Hogarth's other works.

Morning and Night are now in the National Trust Bearsted Collection at Upton House, Warwickshire. In 1948, the collection was assembled by Walter Samuel, 2nd Viscount Bearsted and gifted to the Trust, along with the house. Noon and Evening remain in the Ancaster Collection at Grimsthorpe Castle, Lincolnshire.

== See also ==
- List of works by William Hogarth

== Notes ==
a. Ireland and Paulson both put the clock at 6:55 a.m., though the original painting shows 7:05 a.m. The difference is due to the reversal of the image.

In 1708, E. Hatton recorded the inscription below the clock as Ex hoc Momento pendat Eternitas in his New View of London and did not mention a figure above it. The date 1715 is shown on the clock-case in the 1717 volume of Vitruvius Britannicus, so perhaps indicates the clock had been replaced and the inscription changed to Sic transit gloria mundi as shown here.

b. Battle of the Paintings is Hogarth's take on Swift's The Battle of the Books.

c. Hogarth's works indicate that cats were not common pets in London during his lifetime. They are often depicted suffering the consequences of the life of a vagabond on the streets, in contrast to dogs which are normally shown reflecting the feelings of their masters or good-naturedly testing the limits of society (one notable exception is the first plate of The Four Stages of Cruelty in which the cruelty of society is reflected by the torture of the faithful dog).

== Sources ==
- Cooke, Thomas; Davenport, Samuel (1821). The Works of William Hogarth. London: J.Sharpe.
- Cunningham, Allan (1831). "William Hogarth". The Lives of the Most Eminent British Painters and Sculptors. J and J Harper.
- Dobbs, Austin (2004) [1879]. William Hogarth. Kessinger Publishing. ISBN 1-4179-5924-X.
- Hallett, Mark; Riding, Christine (2006). Hogarth. Tate Publishing. ISBN 1-85437-662-4.
- Hogarth, William (1833). "Remarks on various prints". Anecdotes of William Hogarth, Written by Himself: With Essays on His Life and Genius, and Criticisms on his Work. J.B. Nichols and Son.
- Lichtenberg, Georg C. (1966). Lichtenberg's Commentaries on Hogarth's Engravings. Trans. Innes and Gustav Herdan. London: Cresset Press.
- Paulson, Ronald (1965). Hogarth's Graphic Works. Yale University Press. ASIN B0000CN6E8.
- Paulson, Ronald (1971). Hogarth. Yale University Press. ISBN 0-300-01388-4.
- Paulson, Ronald (1979). Popular and Polite Art in the Age of Hogarth and Fielding. Indiana, USA: Notre Dame University Press. ISBN 0-268-01534-1.
- Paulson, Ronald (1992). Hogarth. Vol. 2: High Art and Low, 1732–50. Lutterworth Press. ISBN 0-7188-2855-0.
- Paulson, Ronald (1993). Hogarth. Vol. 3: Art and Politics, 1750–64. Lutterworth Press. ISBN 0-7188-2875-5.
- Paulson, Ronald (2003). Hogarth's Harlot: Sacred Parody in Enlightenment England. Baltimore, Maryland: The Johns Hopkins University Press. ISBN 0-8018-7391-6.
- Shesgreen, Sean (1974). Engravings by Hogarth: 101 Prints. New York: Dover Publications, Inc. ISBN 0-486-22479-1.
- Shesgreen, Sean (1983). Hogarth and the Times-of-the-day Tradition. Ithaca & London: Cornell University Press. ISBN 0-8014-1504-7.
- Uglow, Jenny (1997). Hogarth: A Life and a World. Faber and Faber. ISBN 0-571-16996-1.
