= A Description of the Morning =

1709 poem by Jonathan Swift

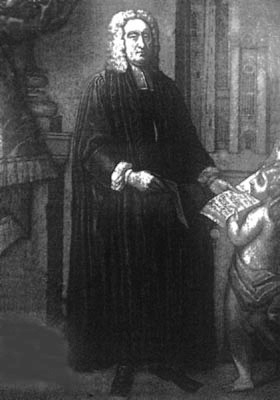
Jonathan Swift

"A Description of the Morning" is a poem by Anglo-Irish poet Jonathan Swift, written in 1709. The poem discusses contemporary topics, including the social state of London at the time of the writing, as well as the developing of commerce and business in the area, and the effect the latter had on the common people and common lifestyle in England. Others have also referred to the text as an early example of the oxymoronic "town eclogue," or "urban georgic". It was first published in October 1710, in the British magazine the Tatler, which was first printed in the same year of the poem's creation.

Following the poem's publication in the Tatler, Swift became an occasional contributor to the content of the magazine, often submitting portions of his work. This collaboration has resulted in Swift's labeling as one of the magazine's more prominent contributors. The subsequent poem by Swift published in the magazine, which was related to "A Description of the Morning" and was entitled "A Description of a City Shower", covers similar topic matter, discussing the artificiality of life in the city and that existence. It has been described by critics, readers, and even Swift himself as the best poem that he ever wrote: "They think 'tis the best thing I ever writ, and I think so too".

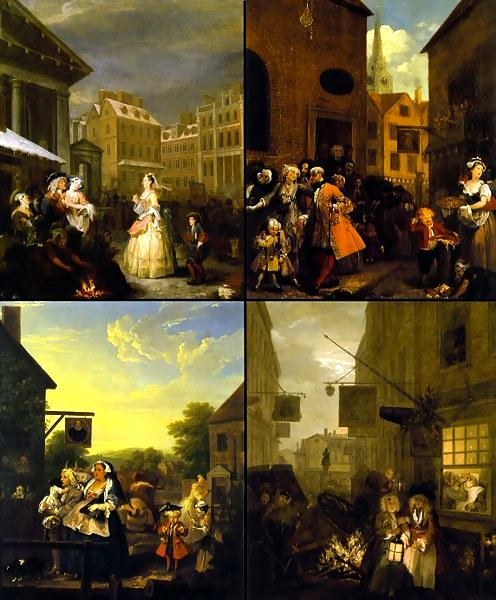
Four Times of the Day, a series of paintings by William Hogarth, was inspired by "A Depiction of the Morning", among other works.

"A Description of the Morning" is often cited as inspiration for other works, including English artist William Hogarth's series of four paintings, Four Times of the Day, among other works and texts, such as John Gay's "Trivia", as well as Swift's own "A Description of a City Shower".
