= The Enraged Musician =

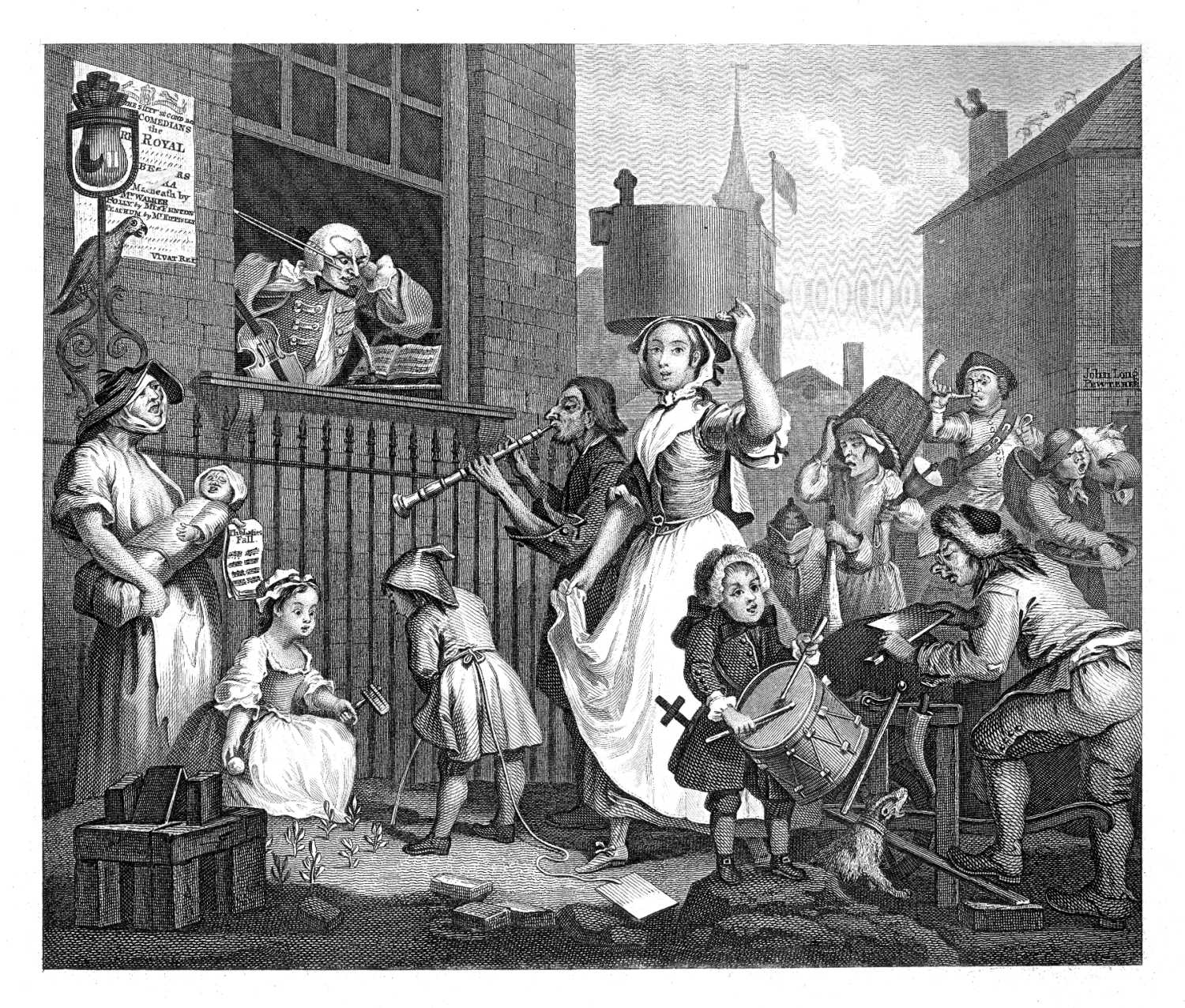
- Artist: William Hogarth
- Year: 1741

The Enraged Musician is a 1741 etching and engraving by English artist William Hogarth which depicts a comic scene of a violinist driven to distraction by the cacophony outside his window. It was issued as companion piece to the third state of his print of The Distrest Poet.

== Background ==
In November 1740, Hogarth advertised his intention to issue a three-image set: The Provok'd Musician, The Distrest Poet, and a third image on the subject of "Painting". The third image was never completed, and the two other prints were issued together in November 1741. The engraving appears to be based on an oil sketch held in the Ashmolean Museum in Oxford, though there are some differences between the monochrome sketch and the engraving.

== Picture ==
The image is ostensibly a purely comic scene. While the violinist attempts to rehearse, the noisiest inhabitants of London pass by his window. On the far left a squawking parrot perches above a pregnant ballad-seller singing "The Ladies' Fall" while holding her bawling baby. A young girl holding a ratchet looks with amazement at a boy urinating below the musician's window (this is an often repeated image in Hogarth's work: similar scenes can be seen in The March to Finchley and in his illustrations for Hudibras and may be a reference to John Gay's "Trivia"). The boy has a cord tied round his waist attached to a trailing slate which would clatter along the ground as he ran. In the centre of the picture a young milk-seller calling her wares provides the real focus of the picture; though set back more from the viewer than some of the subjects, she appears larger than the children and the crouching figure of the cutler. She balances a large pail of milk on her head and is the only subject that looks out at the viewer. This, combined with the large expanse of white apron, draws the viewer's eye towards her. Ronald Paulson, the modern authority on Hogarth, suggests that she is singing and that her beauty and grace—she delicately lifts her skirt to avoid dragging it through the boy's urine—mark her out as the only natural musician in the scene; while the other inhabitants of the street produce discordant notes, the music of the violinist would be no better, because he has restricted himself by his studies and by removing himself from nature. He covers his ears to block out the cacophony of the street noise, but at the same time he denies himself the sweet music of the milkmaid's voice.

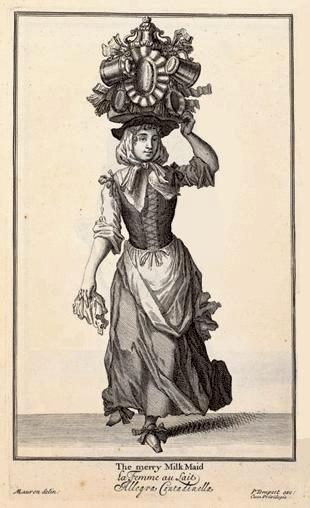
John Savage's etching of Marcellus Laroon's (c.1688) The Merry Milk Maid. Images of the Cryes genre may have been a target of Hogarth's satire; Laroon's The Cryes of the City of London was the most popular series of this type during Hogarth's lifetime.

The milkmaid is flanked on either side by street musicians: to her right a man plays a hautboy, metaphorically thumbing his nose at the violinist; and to her left a small boy beats a drum. Behind the milkmaid, a paviour beats the ground with a heavy rammer. In the lower right-hand corner a dog barks at the racket created by a knife-grinder sharpening a cleaver. Behind these characters, a host of street vendors noisily announce their services: a dustman with a basket on his back rings a handbell, a sow-gelder blows a horn, and a fishmonger cups his hand to his mouth as he shouts. In the distance there is a hint of yet more noise. A church—traditionally identified as St Martin-in-the-Fields yet closer in form to St Giles-in-the-Fields—flies a flag, suggesting perhaps an important event during which bells would be rung. The building to the right is the works of pewterer John Long, from which would issue a constant ring of hammers, and on its roof two hissing cats with arched backs prepare to fight. Appearing from the chimney is a sweep who may be calling to an unseen colleague that his work is done. In the lower left corner some loose bricks—suggestive of building works out of view—have been piled up (no doubt noisily) into a little house. The long-nosed violinist framed in the open window clamps his hands to ears in frustration.

While the image entertains purely by the number of references to noisy activities crammed into the scene, the play-bill for Gay's The Beggar's Opera, prominently displayed on the wall next to the musician's window, hints at developments in British music at the time. The Beggar's Opera had enjoyed extraordinary success and had caused, or at least coincided with, a shift in the taste of audiences away from Italian opera and towards "British" music and homegrown culture. Hogarth was an enthusiastic supporter of the change in public tastes. He had mocked the vogue for continental fashions in many of his works (A Rake's Progress and Marriage à-la-mode both have scenes dedicated to the foolishness of the Levée, and, in 1724, even before The Beggar's Opera, in the earliest of his self-published satirical prints The Bad Taste of the Town Hogarth mocked the fashion for Italian opera and Italian opera singers). The play-bill here is anachronistic as it advertises the play with the original 1728 cast. The musician's identity has never been satisfactorily established. He is identified as an Italian both by Jean André Rouquet, whose French notes on the prints were approved by Hogarth, and by John Trusler who claimed Hogarth's widow's approval for his Hogarth Moralized. He has been variously identified as a number of foreign musicians of the time, including "Corvetto, well known by the name of Nosee" (probably Giacobbe Cervetto, often caricaturized for his large nose), and Pietro Castrucci, the leader of Handel's orchestra. Handel had noted the shift in public taste himself, and from the 1730s he composed more English oratorio and theatre works, including the setting the works of Milton, Dryden and Congreve to music. Hogarth, as well as comically juxtaposing high and low culture, could be suggesting that a foreign tradition is being silenced by a burgeoning sense of Britishness. This may have been an afterthought though, as the playbill was not present in the earliest impressions, and the hautboy player and paver are usually respectively identified as Jewish and Irish, while the drummer boy is dressed in the same fashion as the young Huguenot leaving the church in Noon, the second scene of Hogarth's Four Times of the Day. The musician has also been identified as John Festin (mistakenly rendered as Foster in some accounts), a teacher of the flute and hautboy, by Hogarth's friend and biographer John Ireland and later by the commentator John Trusler. The story Festin told Hogarth obviously provided the inspiration for at least part of the scene:

I once waited upon my lord Spencer, but his lordship being out of town, from him I went to Mr. V——n. It was so early that he was not arisen. I went into his chamber, and, opening a shutter, sat down in the window-seat. Before the rails was a fellow playing upon the hautboy. A man with a barrow full of onions offered the piper an onion if he would play him a tune. That ended, he offered a second onion for a second tune; the same for a third, and was going on: but this was too much; I could not bear it; it angered my very soul—'Zounds!' said I, 'stop here! This fellow is ridiculing my profession; he is playing on the hautboy for onions!'

The hautboy player has similarly defied identification. Charles Frederick Weideman, a leading London flautist, who had played the oboe earlier in his career, has been suggested as the flautist seen playing in plate 4 of Marriage à-la-mode, and in The Enraged Musician: Hogarth's Musical Imagery, Jeremy Barlow claims that he and the hautboy player are one and the same. The presence of many street traders may also satirise Marcellus Laroon's much-copied 17th-century prints of The Cryes of the City of London and more recent images by Hogarth's rival, Giacomo Amiconi.

== Variations ==
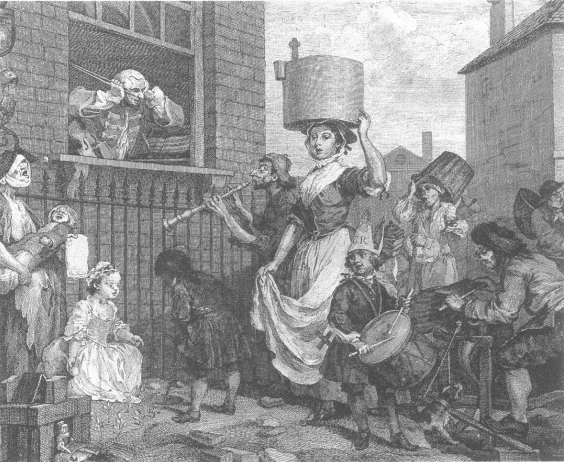
The early trial was not as crowded or, by extension, as noisy, as the issued print. The character of the drummer boy was most changed between versions, but other subjects also underwent alterations, and more features were added.

An early trial impression was missing the church steeple, cats, the man blowing the horn and the play-bill. In this version the dustman was missing his nose (a sign that he was syphilitic), a doll was placed in the model brick house in the foreground, and the drummer boy sported a Grenadier's cap. The drummer was handsome and had turned to look towards the little girl. By the time the print was issued this suggestion of a domestic theme with the boy, girl, and house with "child" had been removed. The boy had his cap removed and his handsome face turned away from the girl and replaced by features which Charles Lamb described as "idiotic". The doll was removed and the girl given a rattle to add to the image of pure noise. Later copies featured a black horse in place of the white horse ridden by the horn blower and showed cross-hatching on the sleeves of the ballad-seller and the play-bill. Later impressions also made the dog and grinder darker, while lightening the cap of the sow-gelder.

== See also ==
- List of works by William Hogarth
