= Outside guard =

Outside guard may refer to:

- Tyler (Masonic), the outside guard of a Masonic Lodge
- Knights of Columbus, a fraternal order with an "Outside Guard" office

== See also ==
- Security guard
- Warden
