= A Description of a City Shower =

1710 poem by Jonathan Swift

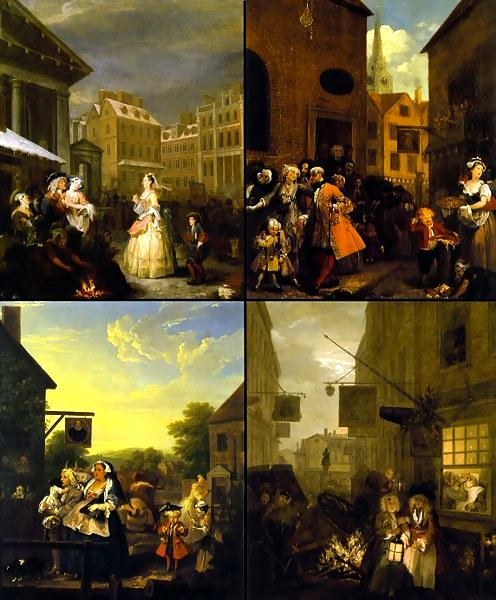
William Hogarth's Four Times of the Day, a series of four paintings, is said to have been inspired by "A Description of a City Shower", among other works.

"A Description of a City Shower" is a 1710 poem by Anglo-Irish poet Jonathan Swift. First appearing in the Tatler magazine in October of that same year, the poem was considered his best poem. Swift agreed: "They think 'tis the best thing I ever wrote, and I think so too". Bonamy Dobrée found it (and Swift's other Tatler verse, "A Description of the Morning") "emancipatory, defiantly anti-poetic... describing nothing that the common run of poets would seize on."

The text concerns modern, urban life, and the artificiality of that existence. The poem also parodies and imitates, in certain parts of its structure and diction, Virgil's Georgics. Other authorities suggest that the poem seeks to mock both the style and character of the way that then-contemporary city life was portrayed by other Augustan writers and poets.

"A Description of a City Shower" is cited as part of the inspiration for William Hogarth's Four Times of the Day, among other works. One of Hogarth's most famous works, Four Times of the Day sheds a humorous light on contemporary life in London, the mores of the various social classes of the city, and the mundane business of everyday life. Among the other works said to have provided Hogarth with inspiration for his series is the aforementioned "A Description of the Morning", published in the Tatler in 1709, as well as John Gay's "Trivia".
