= The London Spy =

1703 book by Ned Ward

The London Spy by Ned Ward (1660/1667 – June 20, 1731) was a periodical about London life, later published as a book. Ward first published the story as a series of 16-page periodicals in 1698–1700, comprising 18 folio editions. They were printed as a collection in book form in 1703 by J. How of Gracechurch Street, London, 1 mi (1.6 km) from where Ward had his public house.

== First person ==
The parts are arranged topographically, the story being told in the first person by the author under the persona of "The London Spy". It concerns his adventures as an ostensibly innocent country gentleman visiting London, his native-Londoner chaperone-cum-guide, and the adventures that befall them. They travel about London, visiting inns and tourist attractions and meeting the people who live there. The work depicts vividly the lower classes of the day and how they made ends meet – including prostitution, robbery, burglary and other felonies. It is a ribald story, written in part in prose and containing many slang expressions of the time.

== Food ==
The London Spy is useful in its depiction of the food of the lower classes. Ward describes the cookshops around London's Smithfield; 'We soon deliver'd our squeamish Stomachs from the Surfeiting Fumes, that arose from their Rotten-Roasted Diet'.
