= Tyler (Masonic) =

Office of outer guard of a Masonic Lodge

Tyler (also spelled Tiler) is the name of the office of outer guard of a Masonic Lodge. Masonic lodges may meet in rooms in taverns and other public meeting places, and all Lodges appoint a Tyler to guard the door from the outside against ineligible masons or malicious or curious people, to check the eligibility of latecomers, and to ensure that candidates for ceremonies in the Lodge are properly prepared. Although a junior Officer of the Lodge and often a highly experienced Past Master, he may often be considered akin to a sergeant: in some cases the Tyler may not be an unpaid member of the lodge, but a mason from another lodge employed for the purpose. Other duties often involve preparing the room for meetings, supplying regalia and equipment, serving as bar steward or acting as permanent, and sometimes resident, caretaker of the furniture and premises.

== Duties of the post ==
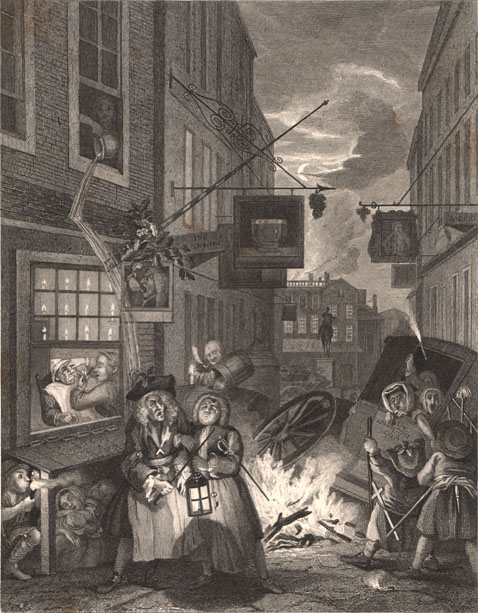
Night, a print by William Hogarth. The figure on the left, carrying a lamp and a sword, is probably a Tyler, escorting his Master of a lodge.

In some Jurisdictions the Tyler is appointed by the Worshipful Master, while in others he is elected by the members of the Lodge. He is charged with examining the Masonic credentials of anyone wishing to enter the Lodge and keeping unqualified persons from infiltrating Masonic meetings, and admitting only those qualified to attend the current business.

In most jurisdictions, the Tyler is required to be outside the Lodge door for large portions of the meeting, although usually in a position to overhear the proceedings. The position has often been given to a deserving Mason who has fallen on hard times, such as the original Grand Master Anthony Sayer, or to a senior Lodge member who can help and advise those kept waiting outside.

In some jurisdictions, the Worshipful Master has the authority to permit or direct the Tyler to "tyle from within" during the non-ritualistic portions of a meeting. If tyling from within, the Tyler must first secure the outer doors of the Tyler's anteroom. He would then leave the inner door open between the lodge room and the Tyler's anteroom, and sit at the seat closest to the door, still holding his drawn sword. Tyling from within enables the Tyler to participate in the business portions of the meeting, voice his opinions, volunteer for committees, deliver reports, and receive instruction if any be given. In other jurisdictions, such as the United Grand Lodge of England, the Tyler is always expected to be outside the closed door of the lodge; on the rare occasions when the Tyler enters the lodge room, another lodge member (typically the Inner Guard or, in the U.S., the Junior Deacon) goes outside to take temporary responsibility for guarding the door.

In some jurisdictions and lodges, the Tyler is the lodge process server; he can be tasked with serving the membership with Masonic summons, messages, or notices at their home or at work when directed by a vote of the lodge or the Worshipful Master.

== Origins of the term ==
The origins of the term are uncertain and a number of hypotheses have been presented over time. Masonic lodges originally met in inns or taverns, and Tyler is an Old English word for the keeper of an inn door. Alternatively, the name may simply come from the occupation of tyler—a person who lays roof and floor tiles. More fanciful suggestions have included:

- In operative Masonry, the Tyler would draw out the blueprints for the Temple/cathedral in chalk on the floor.
- Possibly related to the name of Wat Tyler, or Walter the Tyler, the leader of the Peasants' Revolt of 1381.
- Possibly a revision of the word tether, used to tie the door closed.
- Possibly owing to the tiles being those stones or bricks which seal the structural masonry, whether they be on floors, walls or roofs. Likewise, the Tyler seals the remainder of the activities of the lodge.

== In popular culture ==
William Hogarth's famous print of Night shows a drunken Mason being helped home by the Tyler, from one of the four original Lodges in 1717 at the Rummer & Grapes tavern.

The first name of the character Tyler Durden in the movie Fight Club is believed to be a symbolic reference to the Tyler's duty of enforcing secrecy and discretion and preserving the lodge.

== See also ==
- Masonic Lodge Officers
- Sergeant-At-Arms
- Bailiff (Phaleristic)
