= Southwark Fair =

Painting by William Hogarth

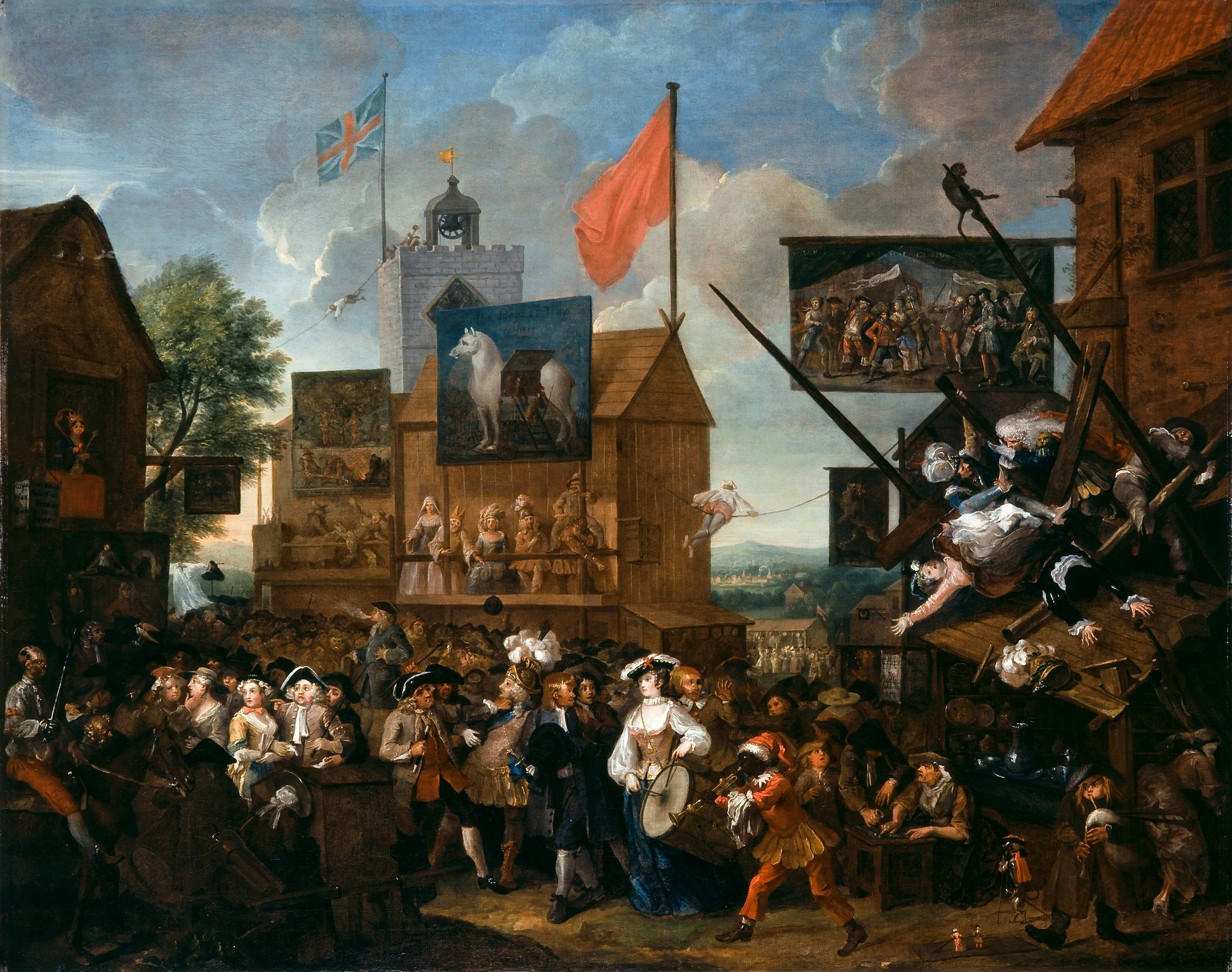
- Artist: William Hogarth
- Year: 1733
- Type: Oil on canvas, genre painting
- Dimensions: 120.7 cm × 151.11 cm (47.5 in × 59.49 in)
- Location: Cincinnati Art Museum, Ohio

Southwark Fair is a 1733 genre painting and engraving by the British artist William Hogarth.

The scene, which was first called simply "A Fair" and only later became associated with Southwark Fair, shows theatrical performances, musicians, a rope-dancer and other entertainers. A stage collapses during a performance. The old church of St. George the Martyr can also be seen, which was torn down and replaced by a new church at the time the picture was executed.

It is said to depict a view of a fair being held in the Borough of Southwark, then a separate settlement from London on the south side of London Bridge. Dating back to 1409, the fair had originally lasted for three days but by Hogarth's time it continued for around two weeks. It was abolished in 1762 because of increasing vice and disturbance.

Today, the painting is in the collection of the Cincinnati Art Museum in Ohio.

== Bibliography ==
- Einberg, Elizabeth. William Hogarth: A Complete Catalogue of the Paintings, New Haven and London: Yale University Press, 2016, pp. 116–120.
- Lawrence, Cynthia. Women and Art in Early Modern Europe: Patrons, Collectors, and Connoisseurs. Pennsylvania State University, 1999, p. 246.
- Paulson, Ronald. Hogarth's Graphic Works, 3rd edn, London: The Print Room, 1989, pp. 86–89.
- Paulson, Ronald. Hogarth, Volume 2: High Art and Low, 1732-1750, New Brunswick and London: Rutgers University Press, 1992, pp. 15ff.
- Riding, Jacqueline. Hogarth: Life in Progress. Profile Books, 2021, p. 37.
- Stevens, Andrew. Hogarth and the Shows of London. University of Wisconsin-Madison, 1996, p. 25.
- Wheatley, Henry B. Hogarth's London: Pictures of the Manners of the Eighteenth Century, London: Constable and Company, 1909, pp. 423–435.
