= Ned Ward =

English writer (1667–1731)

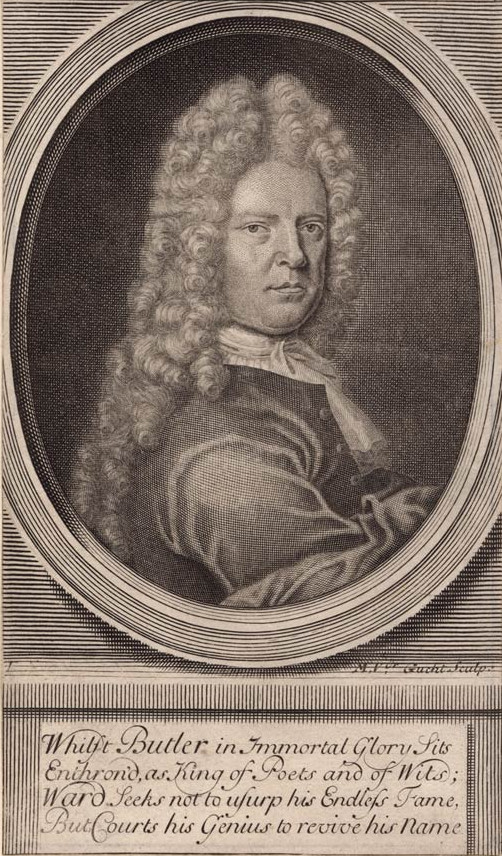
Ned Ward, 1731

Edward "Ned" Ward (1667 – 20 June 1731) was a satirical writer and publican in the late 17th and early 18th century in London. His most famous work, The London Spy, appeared in 18 monthly instalments from November 1698. It was described by its author as a "complete survey" of the London scene and published in book form in 1703.

== Biography ==
=== Early life ===
Ned Ward was born in 1667 in Oxfordshire. According to Theophilus Cibber, Ward was "a man of low extraction... who never received any regular education", but he is likely to have been educated at one of the Oxfordshire grammar schools.

By 1691 Ward had made his way to London. His first publication, The Poet's Ramble After Riches, describes in humorous Hudibrastic couplets his poverty and his disappointment at not receiving an inheritance. Prose satires that followed were Female Policy Detected, or, The Arts of Designing Woman Laid Open (1695) and A Trip to Jamaica (1698). The latter recounts Ward's trip to Port Royal, Jamaica in 1697, satirised the way settlers were recruited to the Americas. Its success led to publication of A Trip to New England in 1699.

His commentary of Jamaica survives, here he mentions the climate was 'As Sickly as a Hospital, as Dangerous as the Plague’ with hurricanes and earthquakes. He noted that the food was disgusting. Most disgusting of all though, he thought were the people. The men looked as if ‘they had just knock’d off their Fetters’ and the women scandalous. Both men and women did not follow religion strongly but instead ‘they regard nothing but Money, and value not how they get it’. He arrived just after the 1692 earthquake and the French invasion in 1694.

=== Literary success ===
Ward adapted the format of A Trip to Jamaica and A Trip to New England to his experiences of London in The London Spy, which was published in 18 monthly parts from November 1698. Narrated by a philosopher who abandons his scholarly pursuits for real-life experience, The London Spy established Ward's name and style in the literary world, so successfully that the series was reprinted in 1703, and for over a decade his writings were labelled "by the Author of The London Spy". The London Spy was followed by over 100 satires in prose and verse, whose targets included ale-house keepers, dissenting ministers, lawyers and booksellers. He extended some of these works into periodicals, such as The Weekly Comedy, as it is Dayly Acted at most Coffee-Houses in London in 1699.

=== Political life ===
Ward was involved in political controversy from as early as 1698. A "High-Church Tory", he launched several attacks on low-church moderation and conformity, the first being Ecclesia et factio (Church and faction, 1698). Ward's best-known political publication, Hudibras Redivivus, issued in 24 monthly parts between 1705 and 1707, drew on topical political materials. Taken into custody both in February and June 1706, Ward was charged with seditious libel for accusing the Queen Anne of failing to support the Tories in Parliament, and was condemned to stand in the pillory.

=== Tavern life ===
Ward was publican at the King's Head Tavern, next to Gray's Inn, London, from 1699. In 1712 he opened an alehouse near Clerkenwell Green. His writings abated somewhat under King George I, focusing after 1712 on local and personal experiences, notably The Merry Travellers (1712), which discussed his own customers. From 1717 to about 1730, Ward kept the Bacchus Tavern in Moorfields. During this time his writings were still gaining popularity and spreading across to the Americas, where even Cotton Mather, the socially and politically influential New England Puritan minister, author and pamphleteer, warned in 1726 against "such Pestilences, and indeed all those worse than Egyptian Toads (the Spawns of a Butler, and a Brown, and a Ward...)". Close geographically to Grub Street, Moorfields offered Ward proximity to his readers. He became a target for Alexander Pope. Between late 1729 and late 1730, Ward left the Bacchus for the British Coffee House in Fullwood's Rents near Gray's Inn.

== Death ==
On 20 June 1731 Ward died and was buried in the churchyard of the parish of Old St Pancras in north London on 27 June. His grave is lost and not listed on the Burdett-Coutts Memorial among the important graves there. His obituary in Applebee's Original Weekly Journal of 28 September 1731 published the names of his wife and children, but there is no record of his marriage.

== Works ==
=== Trip format ===
Ward drew on his own experiences in Port Royal to develop the "trip format", which he continued to use in the first decade of his prominence. He had travelled to Jamaica in the hope of escaping the poverty he experienced in London, but found things no more encouraging in the New World than the Old. This led him to write a biting attack, not only on the New World itself, but on the authors who had written about it in such glowing terms. This type of satirical account, first used by Ward on Jamaica, was extended by him to New England (which he did not visit), Islington, Sadler's Wells, Bath and Cambridge, where he visited the Stourbridge fair.

=== Prose satires ===
In The London Spy, Ward presented the seamier side of life through graphic description, racy anecdotes and character sketches. Some such satires were expanded into periodicals, allowing for extended commentary on specific human and individual vices that Ward experienced personally, particularly within London and in his own taverns.

=== The Prisoner's Opera ===
In 1730 in the wake of the success of John Gay's The Beggar's Opera, Ward wrote the libretto for a similarly-themed ballad opera The Prisoner's Opera which was performed at Sadler's Wells.

== List of works ==
Ward's popularity waned after his death, though The London Spy was serialised by several London and provincial newspapers in the 1730s. The New London Spy was used as a book title by Hunter Davies in 1966.

- The Poet's Ramble After Riches (1691)
- Female Policy Detected, or, The Arts of a Designing Woman Laid Open (1695)
- A Trip to Jamaica (1698) – broadsheet based on personal experience
- A Trip to New-England (1699)
- The London Spy (1698)
- Sot's Paradise (1698)
- Ecclesia et factio (1698)
- The World Bewitched (1699)
- A Trip to Islington (1699)
- A Trip to Sadler's Wells (1699)
- The Weekly Comedy, as it is Dayly Acted at most Coffee-Houses in London (1699; reworked and republished as The Humours of a Coffee-House, 1707)
- A Trip to Bath (1700)
- A Trip to Stourbridge (1700)
- A Journey to Hell (1700–1705)
- The Dissenting Hypocrite (1704)
- Honesty in Distress but Relieved by No Party (1705)
- Hudibras Redivivus (twelve monthly parts, 1705–1707) – an attack on the Whig government causing its author to be pilloried twice: at the Royal Exchange and at Charing Cross
- The Wooden World Dissected (1706) – controversial account of the Royal Navy
- The Diverting Muse (1707)
- The London Terraefilius (1707)
- Mars Stript of his Armour (1708)
- The Secret History of Clubs (1709) (reprinted as Satyrical Reflections on Clubs) – containing one of the first descriptions of homosexual clubs in London
- Nuptial Dialogues and Debates (1710)
- Vulgus Britannicus, or, The British Hudibras (1710)
- Don Quixote (1711–1712)
- The Merry Travellers (1712)
- History of the Grand Rebellion (1713–1715)
- The Hudibrastick Brewer (1714)
- A Vade Mecum for Malt-Worms (1715)
- The Delights of the Bottle (1720)
- The Parish Guttlers (1722)

== See also ==
- List of 18th-century British working-class writers

== Literature ==
- Fritz-Wilhelm Neumann: Ned Wards London. Säkularisation, Kultur und Kapitalismus um 1700, Wilhelm Fink Verlag, München, Germany 2012, ISBN 978-3-7705-4992-4
- Howard William Troyer: Ned Ward of Grubstreet; a Study of Sub-literary London in the Eighteenth Century. London 1946
- Ned Ward, The London Spy (1703). Edited by Kenneth Fenwick (1955). The Folio Society: London
