= Trivia (poem) =

Poem written by John Gay

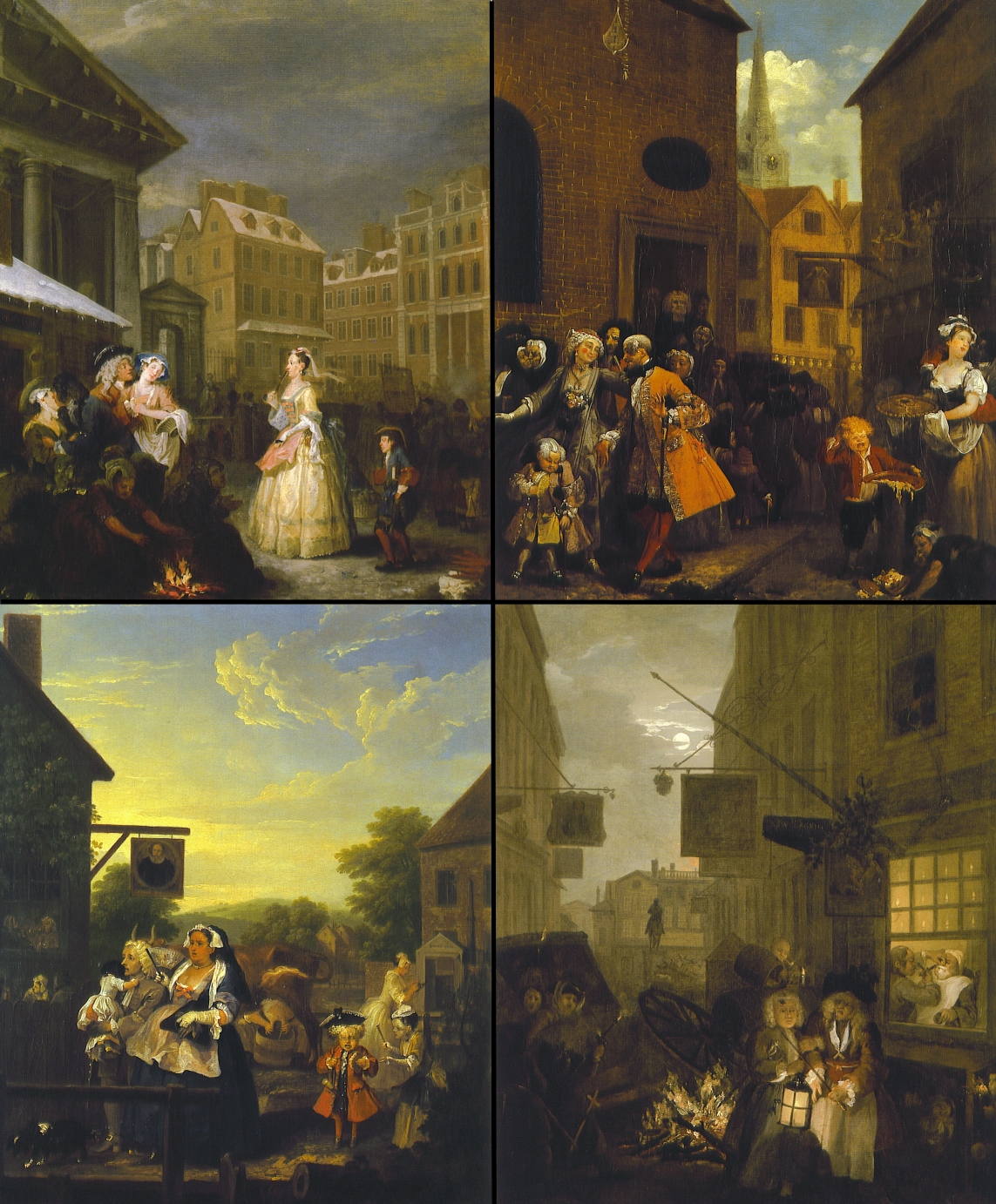

Trivia (1716) is a poem by John Gay. The full title of the poem is Trivia, or The Art of Walking the Streets of London, and it takes its name from the Latin word for "crossroads" and from the "goddess of crossroads," Diana, whom the poet invokes in the opening stanza.

The poem, written in heroic couplets, is loosely based on Virgil's Georgics, yet attains a Horatian satirical manner.

The length of the entire poem is 1288 lines, and it is in three books.

== Content ==
The poem describes the perils of walking in London in the 1710s. It is a topographical poem, taking the form of a walk through a day and night. It pretends to utmost seriousness in advising the reader on:

- how to dress properly
- what sorts of boots to wear
- how to survive falling masonry
- chamber pots being emptied out of windows
- overflowing gutters
- pickpockets
- wig thieves
- mud splashes

Gay also describes the characters of the city, including its ballad singers, chairmen, footmen, and toughs.
