= Le Magny =

Le Magny may refer to the following communes in France:

- Le Magny, Indre, in the Indre department
- Le Magny, Vosges, in the Vosges department
