= Fontenoy-le-Château =

- Commune
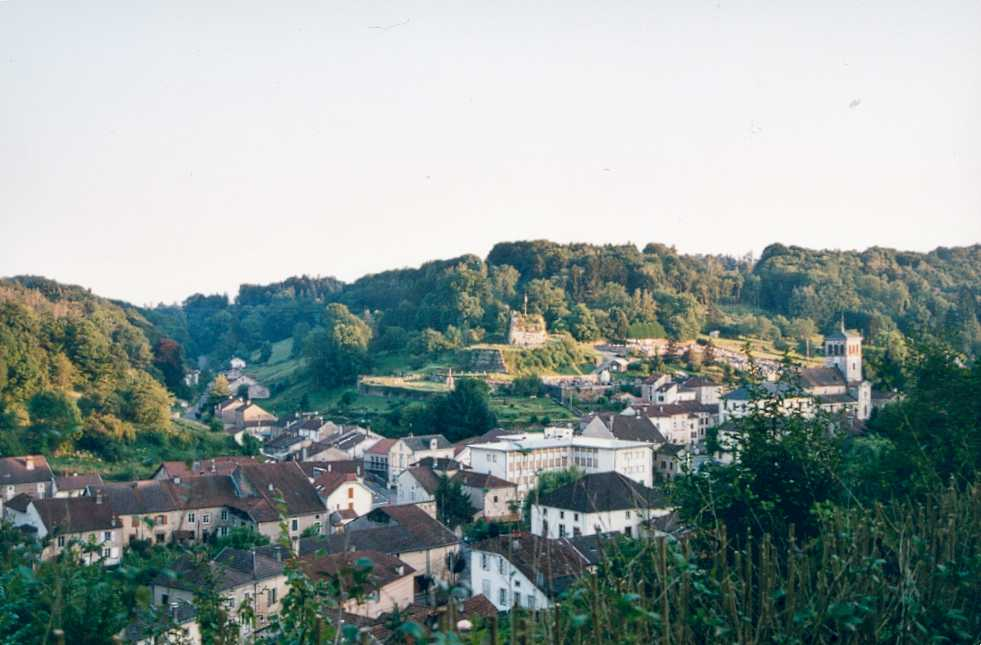
- A general view of Fontenoy-le-Château

- Flag Coat of arms
- Location of Fontenoy-le-Château
- Location within France Location within Grand Est
- Coordinates: 47°58′28″N 6°12′00″E
- Country: France
- Region: Grand Est
- Department: Vosges
- Arrondissement: Épinal
- Canton: Le Val-d'Ajol
- Intercommunality: CA Épinal

Government
  - Mayor (2020–2026): Patrick Vilmar
- Area^{1}: 34.6 km^{2} (13.4 sq mi)
- Elevation: 257 m (843 ft)
- Highest elevation: 461 m (1,512 ft)
- Lowest elevation: 247 m (810 ft)
- Population (2023): 500
  - Density: 14/km^{2} (37/sq mi)
- Time zone: UTC+01:00 (CET)
  - Summer (DST): UTC+02:00 (CEST)
- INSEE/Postal code: 88176 /88240
- ^{1} French Land Register data, which excludes lakes, ponds, glaciers > 1 km^{2} (0.386 sq mi or 247 acres) and river estuaries.

Fontenoy-le-Château (French pronunciation: [fɔ̃tnwa lə ʃɑto]) is a commune in the Vosges department in Grand Est in northeastern France. In January 2013 it merged with the former commune of Le Magny.

== Personalities ==
The poet Nicolas Joseph Florent Gilbert was born on December 15, 1750, in Fontenoy-le-Château. Julie-Victoire Daubié (26 March 1824 in Bains-les-Bains – 26 August 1874 in Fontenoy-le-Château). She was the first woman to have graduated from a French university when she obtained a bachelor's degree in Lyon in 1861. Rico Daniels who is Le Salvager, a TV programme made by Discovery Real Time, lives here and his TV show is filmed here.

== Geography ==
The Côney forms the commune's north-eastern border, flows south-westward through the middle of the commune, crosses the village, and forms part of the commune's south-western border.

== Points of interest ==
- Broderie de Fontenoy-le-Château
- Arboretum de Fontenoy-le-Château
- Château de Fontenoy-le-Château

== See also ==
- Communes of the Vosges department

http://www.felix-giese.de/EUSTORY/index.php
