= The Salvager =

British reality television show

- Genre: Reality television
- Directed by: Warren Green
- Presented by: Rico Daniels
- Opening theme: The Salvager Theme
- Ending theme: The Salvager Theme
- Country of origin: England
- Original language: English
- No. of seasons: 2
- No. of episodes: 25

Production
- Producers: Daneil Allum & Michael Wood
- Production locations: Essex & Vosges
- Editor: James Cooper
- Running time: 22 Minutes [Without Commercials]
- Production company: Attaboy Productions

Original release
- Network: Discovery Real Time
- Release: 2004 – 2005

The Salvager is a British reality television show produced by Attaboy Productions and aired on Discovery Real Time. The show ran for two series featuring Rico Daniels a passionate recycler and salvager scouring scrap yards, council tips and charity shops finding scrap metal and wood and transforming them into useful and unusual items. The second series re-titled Le Salvager relies on the same premise but sees Daniels relocate to the Vosges of eastern France. The show is often repeated on Quest and Discovery Shed in the United Kingdom.

== The Host ==
Daniels was born in Basildon, Essex in 1952. He left school at the age of 15 to become a civil servant but quickly realised it wasn't for him and became an art student. This also displeased Daniels and he eventually became a market trader.

== Screen Test ==
In 2002 Daniels was invited for a screen test about men and their sheds. Although he was not quite right for the show, the producer liked his unique style and commissioned a series showing his talent for transforming trash into treasures.

== Possible Third Series ==
In November 2012 Daniels announced on Twitter that he had sent two pitches for a third series of the salvager to Attaboy Productions the production company that made the first two.

== Series 1 - The Salvager ==
Episode	Title	Description	Airdate
1	Collectors Table	Rico Daniels explains how to create a coffee table from the remnants of old tea caddies as well as other salvaged materials.	2004
2	Dining Room Table	Salvage expert Rico Daniels tests his skills to the limit when he uses some railway sleepers and an axle from an old Jaguar to create a dining room table of the highest quality.	2004
3	Country Kitchen Part 1	Presenter Rico Daniels tries to fit a Shaker-style country kitchen using old doors to create a new cabinet, and finishes the design off with a reclaimed Belfast sink.	2004
4	Country Kitchen Part 2	Presenter Rico Daniels continues with his Shaker-style kitchen project, fashioning a butcher's block from scrap wood, and a unique wine-rack from 20 old bean tins.	2004
5	Wardrobe	Expert craftsman Rico Daniels demonstrates how four old doors can be transformed into a wardrobe, finished with a coating of rustic paint.	2004
6	Ottoman and Wall Mirror	Rico Daniels dismantles an old storage chest and produces a wall mirror complete with iron fixings.	2004
7	Storage Unit	Rico Daniels creates a storage unit using just three old doors and four fruit crates.	2004
8	Four-Poster Bed Part 1	Rico Daniels turns a pile of old fence posts and floorboards into a stylish four-poster bed.	2004
9	Four-Poster Bed Part 2	Rico Daniels skins the leather off old bags, coats and shoes as he sets about designing his own unique headboard.	2004
10	Bookcase	Rico Daniels uses stained glass and dark wood to construct an elegant bookcase.	2004
11	TV Cabinet	Salvage expert Rico Daniels uses an old galvanised water tank and two 1950s fire extinguishers to create a home entertainment unit.	2004
12	Coffee Table and Lamp	Rico Daniels uses an iron street grid, fence posts, a wooden tripod and a Victorian trolley to create a low coffee table and the base of a lamp.	2004
13	Conservatory Chair	Craftsman Rico Daniels strips back a broken sofa and rebuilds it into a conservatory chair.	2004
14	Computer Cabinet	Salvage expert Rico Daniels guts an old harmonium to create a computer cabinet, before cutting down an old church pew to form a matching chair.	2004
15	Corner Unit	Rico Daniels makes a corner unit out of used floorboards, with an old saw blade as a decorative motif.	2004

== Series 2 - Le Salvager ==
Episode	Title	Description	Airdate
1	Dining Table	Rico Daniels creates a bespoke refectory table out of two tree trunks, using roots and old floorboards for the top.	2005
2	Boat and Trailer - Part 1	Rico Daniels converts a transit van into a boat by cutting off the top, fitting out the interior and adding layers of glass fibre.	2005
3	Boat and Trailer - Part 2	Using an old van axle, a steel channel and a sprinkler pipe, Rico Daniels builds a trailer for his newly completed boat.	2005
4	Boiler Cover	Rico Daniels uses wood and metal to make a decorative boiler cover.	2005
5	Kitchen Part 1	Rico Daniels creates an unusual fitted kitchen, using a huge French army copper pot as the sink and various flea market finds as the fixtures and fittings.	2005
6	Kitchen Part 2	Rico Daniels adds the finishing touches to the fitted kitchen, including a splashback made from Roman roof tiles	2005
7	Chaise Longue	Rico Daniels uses rivets and welding to convert a Renault 4 into a metal chaise longue, incorporating the car's headlights.	2005
8	Greenhouse Part 1	Rico Daniels tries to build a greenhouse from reclaimed timber and doors.	2005
9	Greenhouse Part 2	Rico Daniels adds the finishing touches to his greenhouse project by creating a garden path made of roof tiles.	2005
10	Rustic Bookcase	Using a large pine tree from his local forest, Rico Daniels creates a rustic bookcase which he models almost completely with just one tool.	2005
