= Arboretum de Fontenoy-le-Château =

Garden in France

Coordinates: 47°59′30″N 6°13′10″E

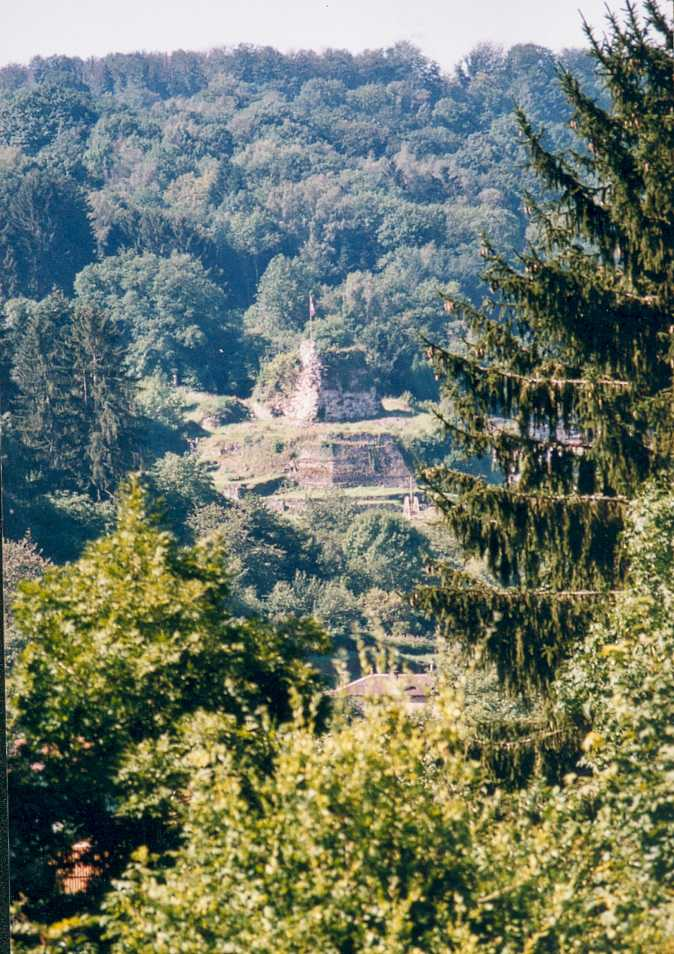
The ruins of Fontenoy-le-Château

The Arboretum de Fontenoy-le-Château (3 hectares) is an arboretum located on the route des Tuileries, Fontenoy-le-Château, Vosges, Grand Est, France. It is open daily without charge.

== See also ==
- List of botanical gardens in France
