= Julie-Victoire Daubié =

French journalist (1824–1874)

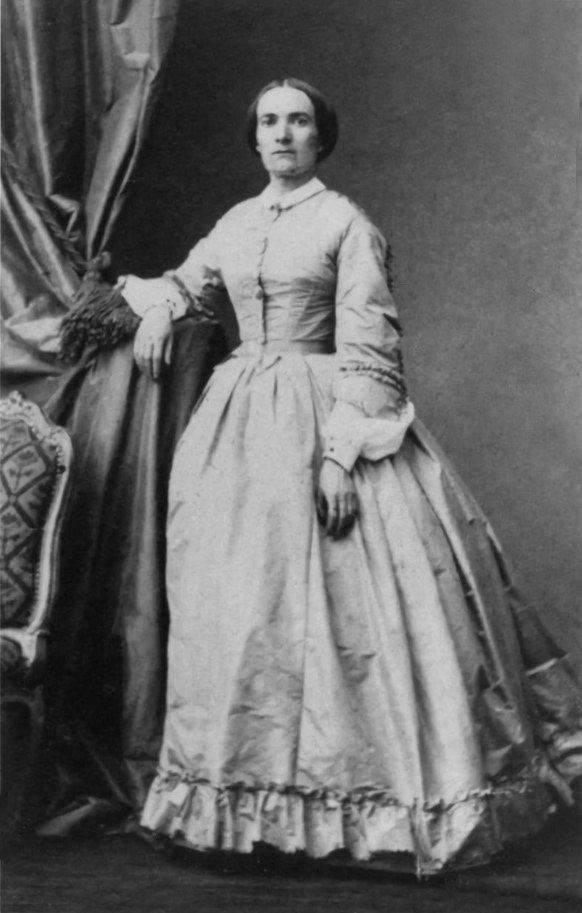
- Born: 26 March 1824; Bains-les-Bains, Kingdom of France
- Died: 26 August 1874 (aged 50); Fontenoy-le-Château, French Third Republic
- Occupation: Journalist
- Known for: First woman to graduate obtain a baccalaureate in France (1861)

Julie-Victoire Daubié (26 March 1824 – 26 August 1874) was a French journalist. She was the first woman to have graduated from a French university when she obtained a licentiate degree in Lyon in 1871.

Josephine Butler translated a part of Julie-Victoire Daubié's books into English.

== Early life ==
Daubié was born on 26 March 1824 in Bains-les-Bains in the Vosges. Her father died when she was less than two years old, and she and her seven siblings moved with their mother to Fontenoy, staying with the family of their father. She studied Latin, Greek, German, history, and geography with help from her brother. In 1844, she received a teacher's certificate of ability and studied zoology at the Museum of Natural History in Paris. At the museum, she was taught by renowned specialist Geoffroy Saint-Hilaire. Despite her education and lack of laws explicitly barring women from entering academia, Daubié was rejected from numerous French universities. Despite the rejections, she continued taking classes while working as a governess.

== Education and career ==
Daubié entered an essay competition in 1859 held by the Imperial Academy of Science and Fine Letters of Lyon. She wrote a nearly-300-page work titled "The Poor Woman in the 19th Century. Female Conditions and Resources," which detailed professional and academic exclusion for women, wage inequality, and other travails. The essay took first prize, and Daubié was given admittance.

In 1861, she became the first woman to present herself at the baccalaureate exams. She was 37 years old when she became the first female baccalaureate in France, in August 1861.

After her graduation, Daubié continued to write about the conditions faced by women as an activist and a scholar. She moved to a large house she purchased in Fontenoy and set up an embroidery shop, which she entrusted to her niece. She also settled on the Champs-Élysées in Paris and became a recognized economic journalist. In 1871, she became an arts graduate in Lyon, becoming the first female licenciate in letters. She remained an activist for women's rights and, later, a journalist.

== Death ==
Daubié died on 25 August 1874, age 50, in Lorraine at the Fontenoy-le-Château, due to tuberculosis.

== Legacy ==
In March 2018, Google featured her in their "Google Doodles".

== Sources ==
- Véronique André-Durupt, Julie-Victoire Daubié la première bachelier, Amis du Vieux Fontenoy, Epinal, 2011.
- Raymonde Albertine Bulger Lettres à Julie-Victoire Daubié, New York, Peter Lang, ed. 1992
- Raymonde Albertine Bulger " Les démarches et l'exploit de Julie-Victoire Daubié première bachelière de France ", The French Review (États-Unis), décembre 1997
- James F. Mcmillan, France and Women 1789–1914: Gender, Society and Politics, ed. Routledge, London, New York, 2000.
- The Riverside Dictionary of Biography: A Comprehensive Reference Covering 10,000 of the World's Most Important People, From Ancient Times To The Present Day, ed. Houghton Mifflin, Boston New York, 2005.
- Rebecca Rogers, From the Salon to the Schoolroom: Educating Bourgeois Girls in Nineteenth-Century France, ed. Penn State Press, 2005
- Théodore Stanton The Woman Question in Europe, New York, 1884
