= Château de Fontenoy-le-Château =

Ruined castle in Grand Est, France

Coordinates: 47°58′23″N 6°12′1″E

The Château de Fontenoy-le-Château is a ruined castle located in the commune of Fontenoy-le-Château in the Vosges département of north-eastern France.

It held a defensive role from the beginning of the 10th century until its partial destruction in 1635, during the Thirty Years' War.

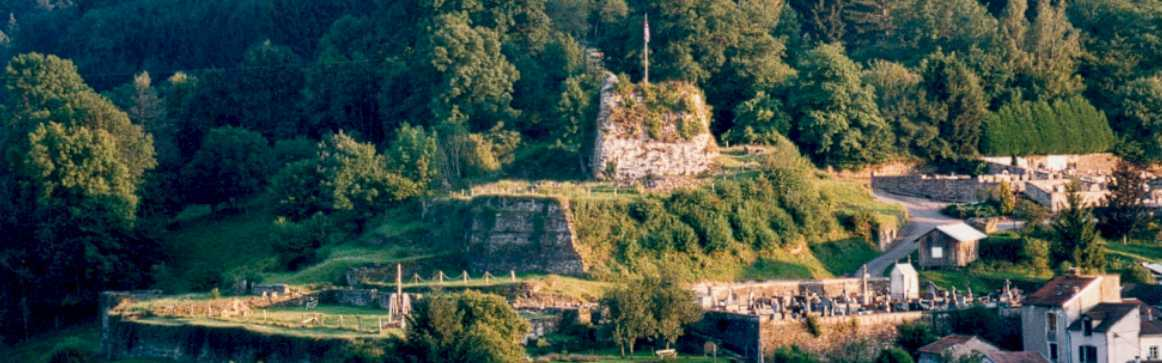
Panoramic view of the ruins of Fontenoy-le-Château

== History ==
=== Creation ===
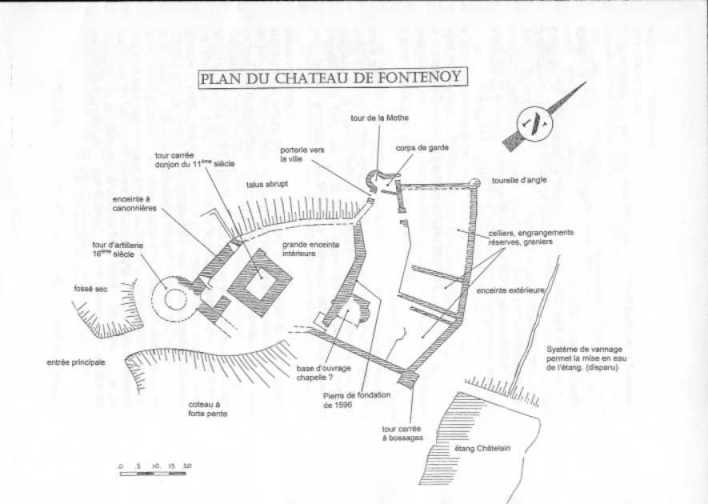
Map of the castle

In the late 10th century, around 980, the Bishops of Toul, who owned this allodial title, built a large square tower to protect their territory and to close the Valley of Côney River. It was one of the first fortresses in the south of the Vosges, along with Épinal and Remiremont. This square tower was a building of exceptional quality for this period, which was showing the power of its owners and was controlling the pathway between Burgundy and Lorraine. This tower is quite unconventional for the 10th century: roughly 45 feet by 52 (13.5m × 16m) on the ground, walls more than 10 feet thick, and especially, stones of unusual dimensions.

Located on a sandstone rocky outcrop, at the confluence of the Côney River and the Châtelain stream, the castle was protected by the natural steepness on the majority of its sides. A system of dams, now disappeared, allowed the stream valley to be flooded in the event of danger.

The principal entry was defended by a dry ditch, the trace of which is still visible, a huge area of thorn bush also complicating the approach.

The lower terraces, not vulnerable, sheltered the dependences, storerooms and barns.

The water supply was ensured by the collection from the numerous sources on the site, hence the place name: Fonteniacum Castellum.

=== Reinforcement ===
The castle saw two important reinforcement phases.

In 1360, the powerful Neufchatel family arrived at Fontenoy after the marriage of Thibaut VI to Marguerite de Châlons, Dame of Fontenoy. The site was enlarged to strengthen its defences towards the neighbouring duchy of Lorraine.

In the second half of the 15th century, the higher curtains were adapted to artillery.

It was in 1596 (the date attested to by a foundation stone still in place in the high enclosure of the castle) that Diane de Dompmartin and her husband Charles Philippe de Croÿ consolidated the defences, and made Fontenoy a safe place, to become the necessary relay in the North-South trade.

=== Dismantling ===
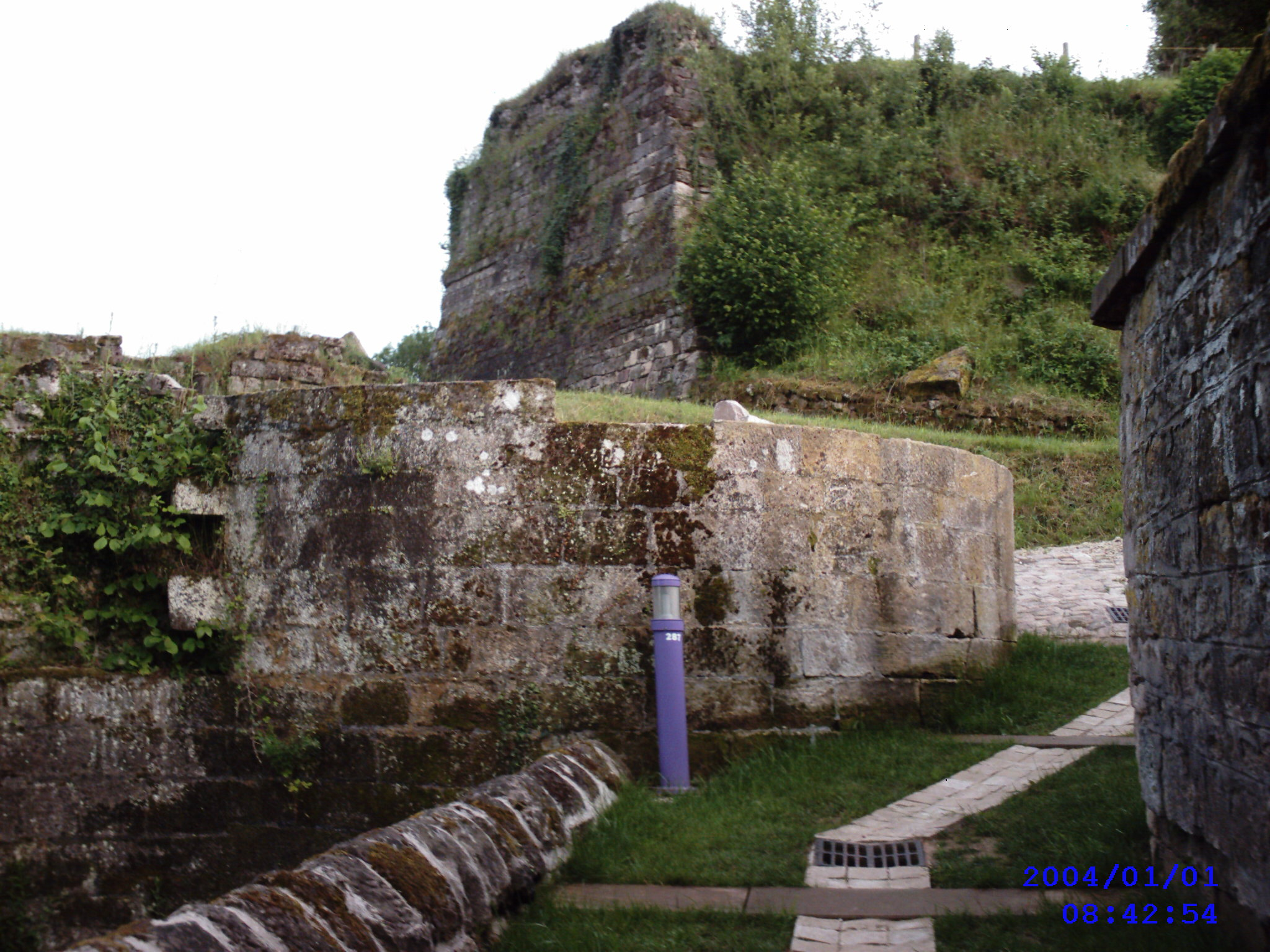
The round tower

The castle was dismantled in the 17th century.

The house was sporadically inhabited until the French Revolution. But from 1750, due to the intensive construction of the village of Fontenoy, the ramparts were dismantled and their stones used to build houses.

In 1784, Marc Antoine de Voyer described the castle thus:

« (the fortress) still has its walls and his doors, some towers of the outer works have been ruined… and one can still see on the chimneys of the castle: J'aime qui m'aime, vive Crouy (I like who likes me, long live Crouy). »

The keep was sold as biens nationaux (national property), «for its materials». The stone facing has almost completely disappeared; the destabilized sections of wall were ruined, the terraces sold, levelled, and transformed into vegetable gardens.

During the 19th century the dismantling of the walls was complete; the stones were used to build the town hall. Finally, to prevent the hazards of collapse, some walls were even blown up with explosives.

During the 1930s, Mr Louis Olivier complained at the inescapable disappearance of the keep and of the ruins that «nobody came even to maintain».

=== Today ===
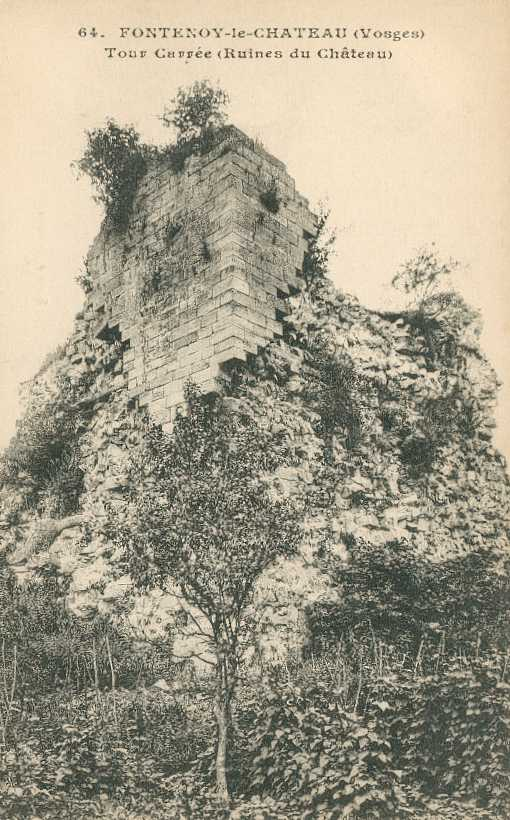
The keep, circa 1900

Nearly thousand years after its foundation, only the keep remains as a ruin, still imposing, but threatened with a fast disappearance, so much degraded is its state.

A local association which works for the safeguard of the local inheritance, Les Amis du Vieux Fontenoy (the Friends of Old Fontenoy, or A.V.F), founded in 1978, launched an operation named S.O.S. Donjon. The goal of this project is to restore a facing on the Square Tower to halt its deterioration and to give back "legibility" to the site. The first stone of the new facing will be posed on July 5, 2008 during the medieval, festivals.

== See also ==
- List of castles in France
