= Grub Street in France =

This article focuses on Grub Street in France.

The term "Grub Street" refers to a street in London, England where a high number of struggling writers lived in the 18th century. Eventually, the term became a metonym for hack writers. Although the term was used in the 18th century to refer to English hacks, in the 20th century the term was expanded to refer to hack writers in other parts of Europe.

== Hacks ==
Robert Darnton's The Literary Underground of the Old Regime offers the most complete analysis of French hack writers. According to Darnton, hacks constitute a group of struggling writers (a "literary proletariat") who cobbled together a living by engaging in a range of practices: underground journalism, pamphlet-writing, education, spying on other intellectuals for the police, etc. They were generally excluded from the prestigious institutions of the day (namely, the academies) because of their low social position within the Old Regime. These individuals lived difficult lives and could not escape the psychology of failure that surrounded them. This alienation bred an active hatred of the hierarchies of the Old Regime, and fueled the radicalism of the French Revolution (since many hacks wound up in power after 1789). The common French word for hack literature is "libelle," and a hack writer is a "libelliste."

Examples of French hacks include Pidansat de Mairobert, Simon-Nicholas Henri Linguet, Jacques Pierre Brissot, Jean-Paul Marat, and Nicolas-Joseph-Florent Gilbert.

Hacks typically wrote radical, salacious, or subversive literature, such as plays, novels, and pamphlets about controversial subjects. This literature (called libelles) constituted a large portion of the works that circulated in the illegal book trade.

Political libel was a popular mode of writing in order to directly attack those in power. They charged the monarchy with being morally corrupt, incompetent, and impotent.

During the High Enlightenment, hacks in France shared with hacks in England a difficult existence. The hacks in England were satirized by Alexander Pope in The Dunciad and William Hogarth in paintings that depicted the poor and deplorable state of the hack writer.

In France, Voltaire satirized the literary underground, calling them below the level of prostitutes. He sought to warn the youth away from the hack lifestyle. Both Voltaire and Diderot made the hack writer into an object of ridicule, an intellectual Pantaloon, and then cast their enemies into this role. These views reflected the wider views of the established philosophes (French for philosophers) in this period.

The deaths of the most famous philosophes in the 1770s and 1780s signaled the end of the High Enlightenment. A new, more radical, less established generation of philosophers emerged in this period, filling the void in public discourse left by the philosophes.

Darnton also argues that hacks were mainly individuals who could not make it as philosophes and thus could only "sustain their miserable lives by doing whatever odd jobs fell their way." Darnton states that most hacks lived in general obscurity, making it relatively difficult to conduct research on them.

Since these hacks often held radical ideas, they were frequently placed under surveillance by the police, who spied on them at cafes. Many became spies to avoid jail time or earn extra money. Hacks generally did any kind of work for hire whether that be the smuggling and selling of illegal books or compiling anthologies.

Darnton states that libelles tended to communicate a revolutionary point of view that showed social rot was consuming French society, eating its way downward from the top.

Grub Street hacks tended to advocate for a democratic social contract--the idea of popular sovereignty and social revolution. This perspective was a radical one in monarchist France.

== Publishing ==
The publishing of libelous and illegal books was often done outside France since the networking of hacks was fairly significant. It acted as a grapevine circuit in which publishing houses would print and manufacture the literature and then networks of workers would smuggle it into France. The booksellers would then distribute the books by selling them on the streets or in small stores.

The books were printed on cheap materials in order to ensure easy transportation and maximizing of profits for both the publisher and the seller. Within Darnton’s book he presents historical anecdotes of individuals who were involved in the publishing, manufacturing, and selling of illegal literature. As stated in Darnton’s book, it is not known how many titles were published, where the markets were in terms of regions, and who bought them, but it is possible to gauge some of what the publishers were producing and selling.

Through the example of one bookseller Mauvelain, his clients were not in the market for treatises by such writers as Montesquieu, Voltaire, Diderot, and Rousseau, but rather for writings produced by hack writers who vulgarized the Enlightenment. There were markets for atheistic books and other immoral works such as pornography and chroniques scandaleuses. Chroniques Scandaleuses are journalistic accounts of love affairs, crimes, and sensational events.

Within Darnton’s work, considerable attention is paid to the individuals who worked in the publishing houses, as operations were dangerous to carry out. In order to properly distribute and sell the books it was necessary to have a police connection to make sure goods were successfully into France, and to the appropriate party.

A business mostly based upon speculation on how many books would sell and the commission from the selling of the books was risky. Through Darnton’s research it is evident (based on his research of a Swiss publishing house STN) that publishers did not usually make much of a profit since good workers were hard to come by and the booksellers or smugglers were unreliable to make any payments for the shipments of books.

Publishing was a very risky business to get involved in but since the market was there, entrepreneurs made the decision to get into it.

== Libelous Literature ==
Libelous literature is characterized as literature that is slanderous in nature in a direct attempt to discredit or ridicule an individual in authority. Libelous literature written by hack writers was aimed at the monarchy, and those associated with it and the Church. The literature had a particular political bite. Darnton states that there was an emphasis on scandal where private decadence became a public issue, and by slandering eminent individuals, they criticized the whole regime.

This literature was illegal and the police had the responsibility of censoring and banning these works that sought to discredit the regime that ruled over the French kingdom. The police force had the potential to be bribed to let the smuggling pass through different regions in France. Political material such as pamphlets and other pieces of underground journalism through this medium it was possible for citizens to be slightly informed on current events since there was no newspaper that circulated within France during the Old Regime. Therefore clandestine literature was able to circulate around France. Libelous literature did not just operate on a topical level but instead on a level in which an ideological struggle was evident.
