= Broderie de Fontenoy-le-Château =

Museum in Vosges, France

Coordinates: 47°58′28″N 6°12′00″E

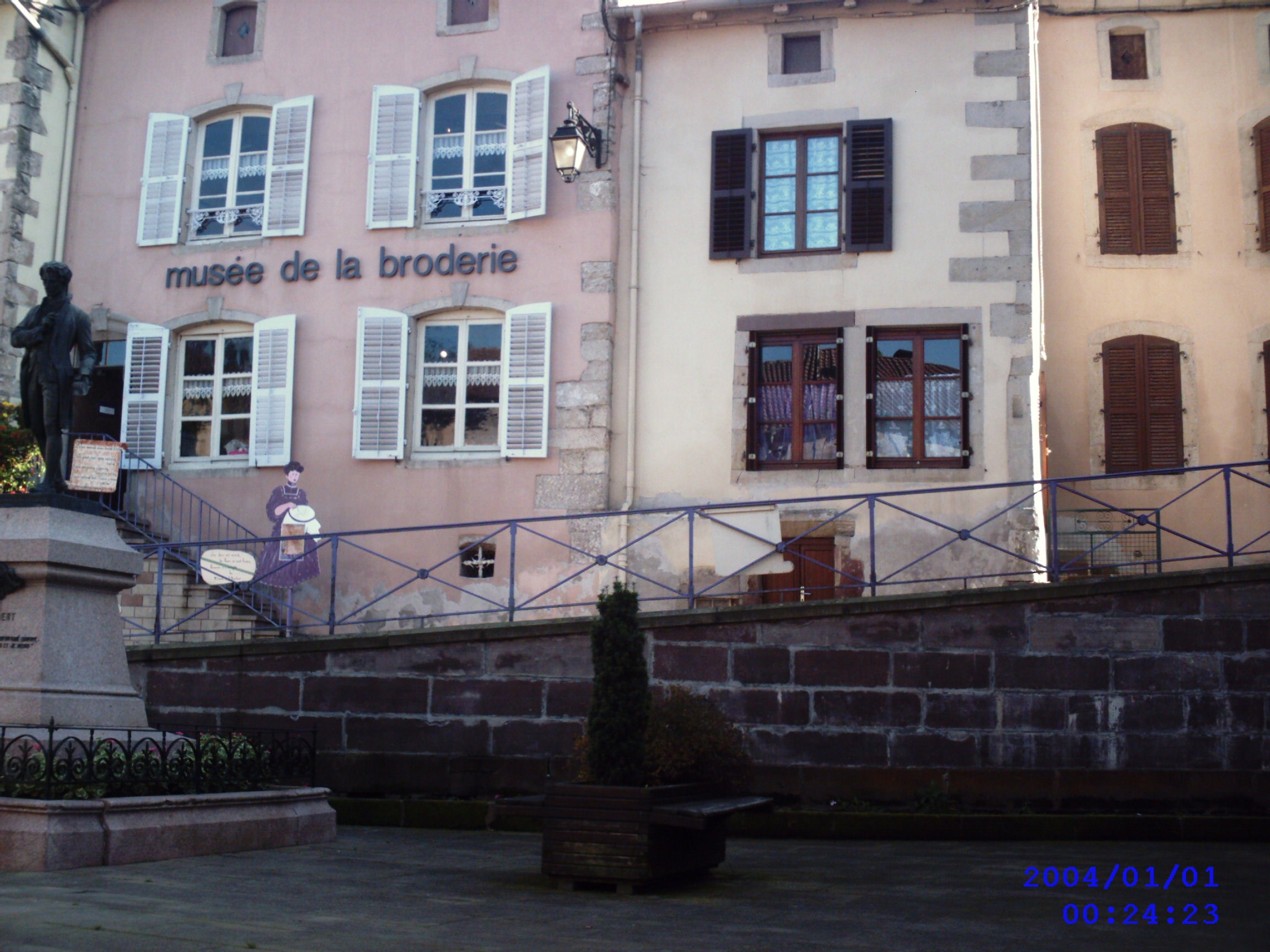

Broderie de Fontenoy-le-Château is a museum in Vosges, France. Opened in 1979, it is noted for its embroidery.
