= Le Magny, Vosges =

Le Magny
- Part of Fontenoy-le-Château
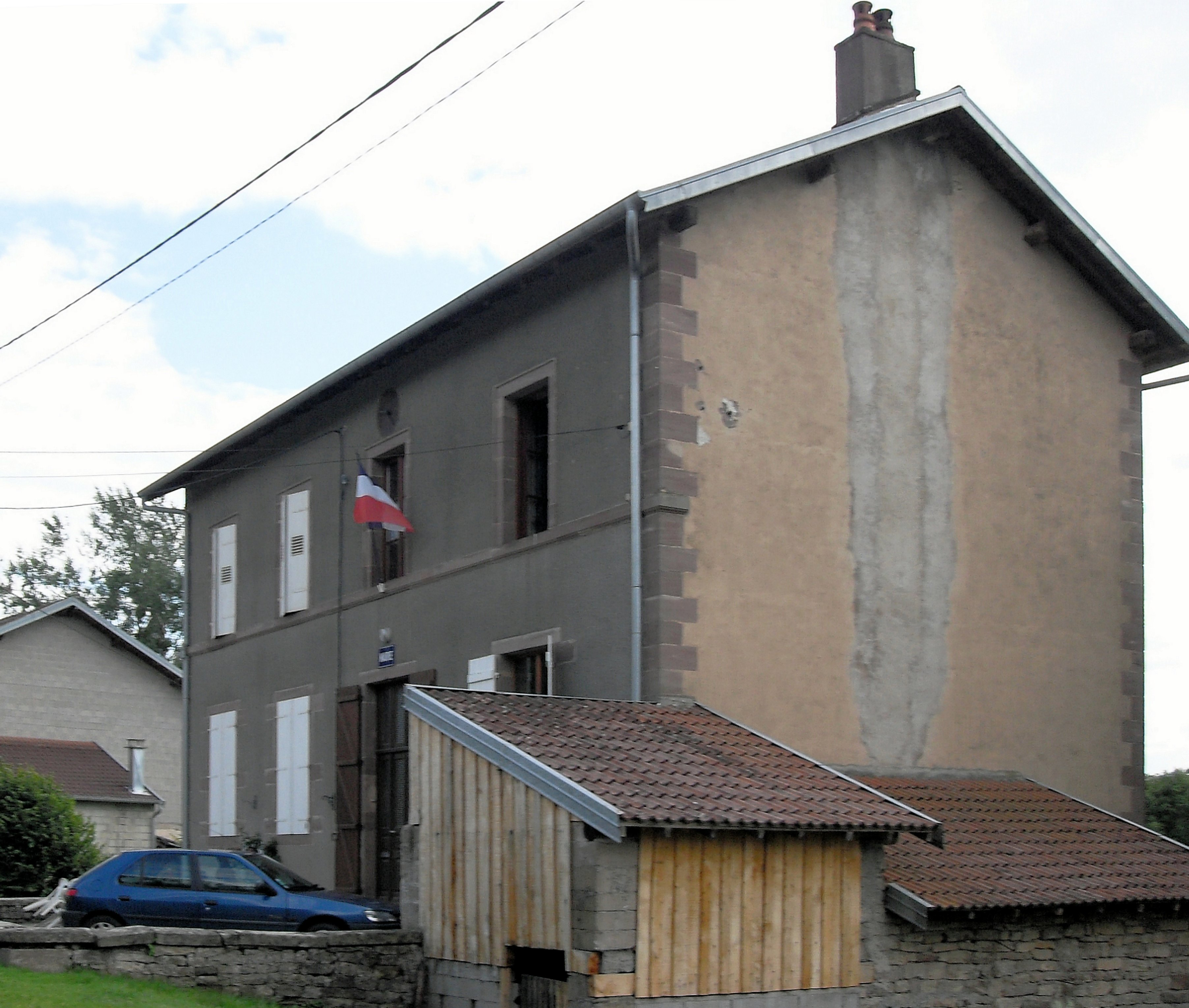
- Town hall
- Location of Le Magny
- Location within France Location within Grand Est
- Coordinates: 47°58′01″N 6°10′38″E
- Country: France
- Region: Grand Est
- Department: Vosges
- Arrondissement: Épinal
- Canton: Le Val-d'Ajol
- Commune: Fontenoy-le-Château
- Area^{1}: 3.53 km^{2} (1.36 sq mi)
- Elevation: 330 m (1,080 ft)
- Highest elevation: 347 m (1,138 ft)
- Lowest elevation: 242 m (794 ft)
- Population (2010): 40
  - Density: 11/km^{2} (29/sq mi)
- Time zone: UTC+01:00 (CET)
  - Summer (DST): UTC+02:00 (CEST)
- Postal code: 88240
- ^{1} French Land Register data, which excludes lakes, ponds, glaciers > 1 km^{2} (0.386 sq mi or 247 acres) and river estuaries.

Le Magny is a former commune in the Vosges department in Lorraine in northeastern France. It merged into the commune of Fontenoy-le-Château on 1 January 2013.

== Geography ==
The Côney forms the commune's northern border; a stream called la Becêne, a tributary of the Côney, forms its eastern border.

== See also ==
- Communes of the Vosges department
