= Nicolas Joseph Laurent Gilbert =

French poet (1750–1780)

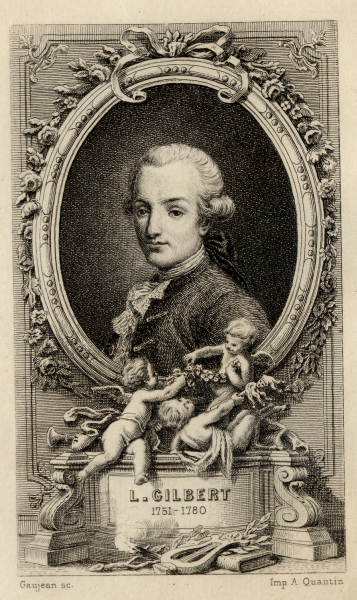
Nicolas Gilbert

Nicolas-Joseph-Laurent Gilbert (December 15, 1750 – November 16, 1780) was a French poet born at Fontenoy-le-Château, Vosges, Lorraine.

Having completed his education at the college of Dole, he devoted himself for a time to a half-scholastic, half-literary life at Nancy, In 1772 he competed unsuccessfully for a prize at the French Academy and he identified himself as an unhappy poet. However, in 1774 he found his way to the capital, where he received recognition. As an opponent of the Encyclopaedists and a panegyrist of Louis XV, he received considerable pensions. He died in Paris in 1780 from the results of a fall from his horse.

The satiric force of one or two of his pieces, as Mon Apologie (1778) and Le Dix-huitième Siècle (1775), would alone be sufficient to preserve his reputation, which has been further increased by modern writers, who, like Alfred de Vigny in his Stello (chaps. 7–13), considered him a victim to the spite of his philosophic opponents. His best-known verses are the Ode imitée de plusieurs psaumes, usually entitled Adieux à la vie.

Among his other works may be mentioned Les Familles du Darius et d'Eridame, histoire persane (1770), Le Carnaval des auteurs (1773), Odes nouvelles et patriotiques (1775). Gilbert's Œuvres complètes were first published in 1788.
