= Rico Daniels =

English television presenter (born 1952)

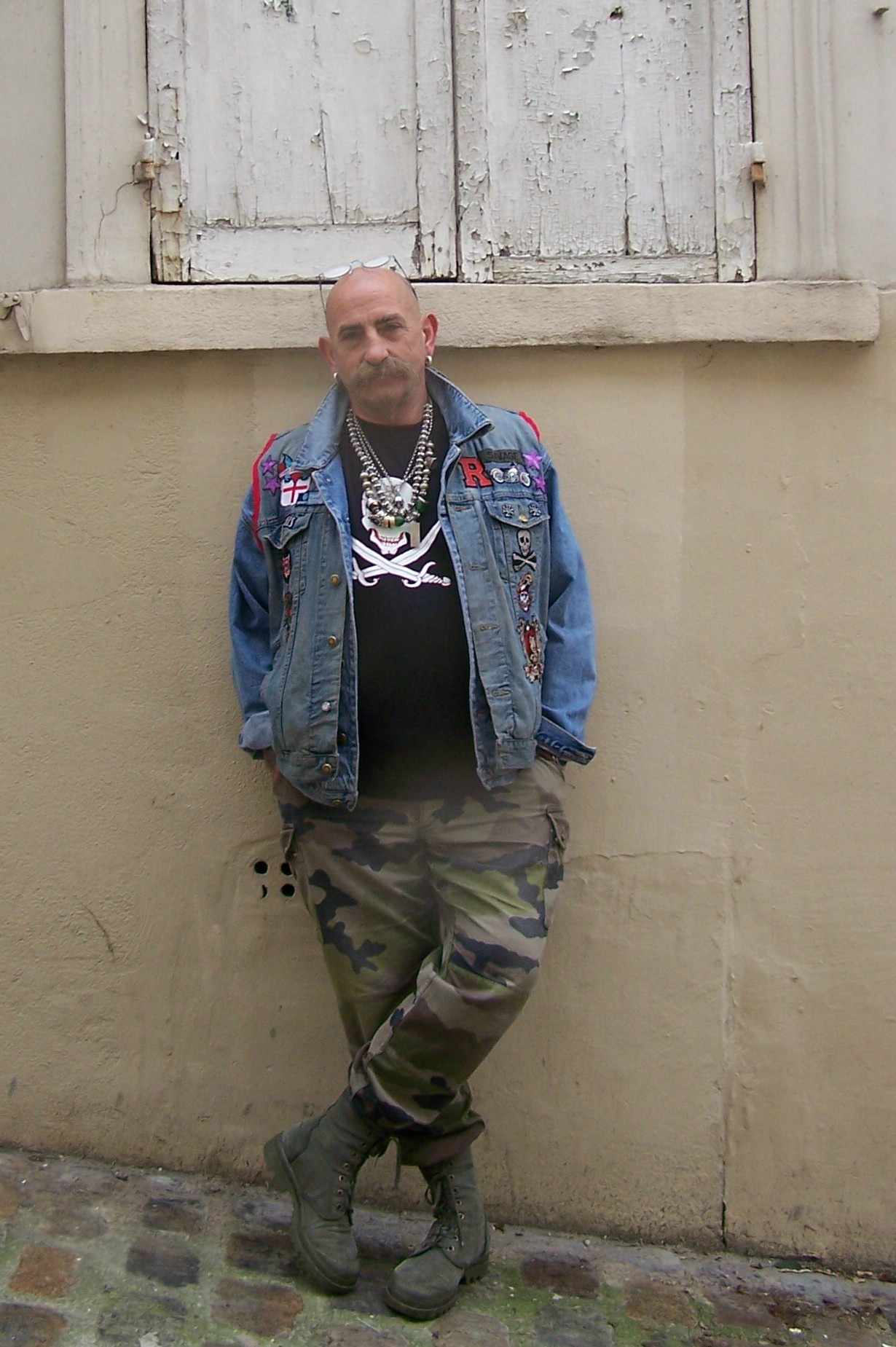
- Rico Daniels
- Born: Rico Daniels; 1962 (age 63–64); Basildon, Essex, UK
- Education: Sweyne School, Rayleigh, Essex
- Occupations: Television Presenter and Salvager

Rico Daniels is an English television presenter who has his own show, The Salvager on Discovery Real Time. A passionate recycler, the second series (similar in content to the first) saw him moving in France and was called Le Salvager.

Born in Basildon, Essex in 1962, Daniels was brought up in the town and left school at 15 to become a civil servant, but soon realised this was not for him and enrolled as an art student. Disliking the formal tuition, Daniels embarked on a range of jobs before settling for the life of a market trader. In 2002, he was invited to screen test for a new programme about men and their sheds. While he was not quite suitable for this assignment, the producer liked his style and commissioned him for a series of programmes showcasing his talent for changing something unwanted into a piece of furniture, which was to become the show we know today as The Salvager name changed to Le Salvager when the presenter moved to France after filming of the show. Rico has had fans across the globe, particularly across the UK, inspiring a generation with his creativity, craftsmanship and memorable ‘salt of the earth’ personality. Over the years, Rico has been spotted by fans at the Bulldog Bash motorcycle rally in Stratford-upon-Avon.

The Salvager is occasionally aired on Quest.
