= Tyndall =

Family name

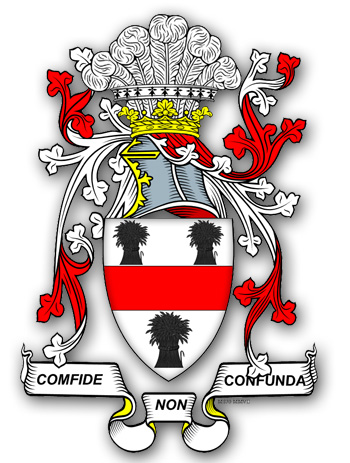
The arms of the Tyndall family of Deane and Hockwald.

Tyndall (the original spelling, also Tyndale, "Tindol", Tyndal, Tindoll, Tindall, Tindal, Tindale, Tindle, Tindell, Tindill, and Tindel) is the name of an English family taken from the land they held as tenants in chief of the Kings of England and Scotland in the 11th, 12th and 13th centuries: Tynedale, or the valley of the Tyne, in Northumberland. With origins in the ancient Anglo Saxon nobility of Northumbria, the Royal Scottish House of Dunkeld and the Anglo-Norman nobility, they have contributed courtiers, judges, writers, historians, sailors, airmen, scientists and philosophers to the history of England, Ireland and the new world. Two members of the family were offered, and declined, the throne of Bohemia in the 15th century and one of their number, William Tyndale, was the first modern translator of the Bible into English and one of the most important figures in the evolution of the modern language. The family is spread today throughout the British Isles and the English speaking world.

== Origins ==
The first documented Lord of Tyndale, from which the Tyndall family derive their name, was Uchtred or Huctred Fitz Waltheof, who married Bethoc, daughter of Donald III, King of Scots from 1093 to 1099. His daughter Hextilda married Richard Comyn, and this connection served as the basis for John Comyn II of Badenoch to put forward a claim to the Scottish crown.

=== Barony of Tindale ===
The earliest feudal records indicate that an Adam de Tindale was the feudal Baron of South Tyne-dale and of Langeley/Langley Castle, both in the county of Northumberland. Adam was succeeded by his son, Adam, who held the Barony during the reign of Richard I of England. He left two daughters, who became co-heirs to the Tindale Barony and to Langley Castle. The elder, Philippa, married Adam Nicholas de Bolteby and conveyed to her husband the Barony of South Tyne-dale. It passed through inheritance in the female line to the family of Lucy and, later, to the Earls of Northumberland. The Barony of Langley and its associated manor continue to modern times as an originally feudal Prescriptive Barony (not a Peerage), and an extensive series of baronial and manorial records are maintained in the National Archives (UK).

=== "Tindale" in the Peerage ===
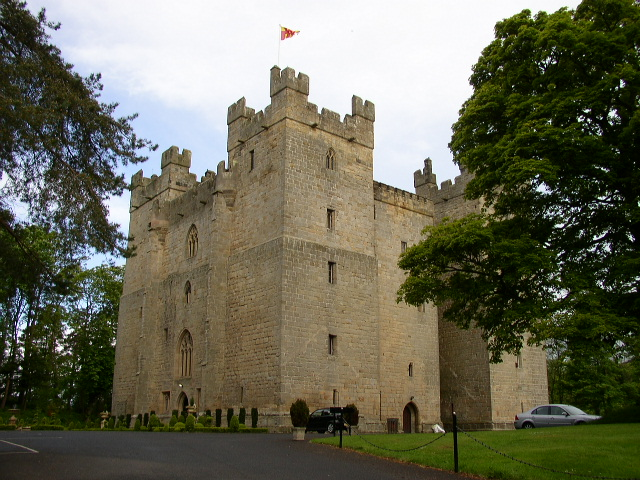
Langley Castle, seat of Baron Adam de Tindale before being extended and rebuilt

The Parliamentary Barony, Baron Scott of Tindale in Northumberland, was created in 1663 for the ill-fated Duke of Monmouth, and 1st Duke of Buccleuch, James Scott, the illegitimate son of King Charles II. This title was put under attainder, upon his execution for treason in 1685, but later restored, together with the Earldom of Doncaster in 1743. There is, however, a legend that King James II did not have him executed but exiled to France, where he became known as the Man in the Iron Mask.

Another Barony of Tyndale was created in 1688 as the junior title of the Radclyffe Earl of Derwentwater and in 1716 fell under attainder on his execution for treason for his part in the Jacobite rising of 1715.

== From the Middle Ages to the early modern era ==
The second son of the first Baron Adam de Tindale, Robert, settled at Tansover in Northamptonshire in the time of Edward I. Some of the (later) genealogies and secondary sources for the family from this period are written in English and use 'Tyndale', for the reasons posited above. The more contemporary 'Visitation of Essex' uses 'Tyndall', a spelling used below.

The first that is known of the family after their migration to Northamptonshire was the enlargement of their estates through marriage into the Deane family. The Deanes were, from the earliest generations, intimately connected with the Tyndall family. The elder son of Robert de Tyndall of Talsover married the heiress of that family and inherited the lands of Deane, which remained in the family for many generations. The Deane arms have been quartered with those of Tyndall ever since and were adopted as the only arms of the Tindal branch of the family from the 17th century (and can be seen, below, under the portrait of Rev Nicolas Tindal).

=== The Tyndalls at court ===
Subsequent Tyndalls married well, inheriting the estates of Hockwald in Norfolk and Mapplestead Magna in Essex in marriages with heiresses of the de Montford and Fermor families. Several heads of the family were knighted and many appear to have been prominent at court. A William Tyndall was Lancaster Herald under King Edward IV. Sir William Tyndall of Hockwald and Deane was created Knight Companion of the Most Honourable Order of the Bath on 29 November 1489, on the creation of Prince Arthur as Prince of Wales in the reign of Henry VII. He was a Herald of the King, first as Guisne Pursuivant and later as Rouge Dragon.

His son, Sir Thomas Tyndall, was admitted to the Order of the Bath following the coronation of Queen Anne. Through marriage to the Felstead family, he became co-heir to the Barony of Scales, the daughter of the last Baron Scales having died without issue. He shared this distinction with the then Earl of Oxford.

=== The Tyndall Family and the Throne of Bohemia ===
When King Richard II married Anne of Bohemia, daughter of the Holy Roman Emperor Charles IV, she brought with her cousin, Princess Margaret of Teschen, daughter of Przemyslaus I Noszak, Duke of Teschen in modern Silesia by his wife Elizabeth, daughter of Bolesław, Duke of Koźle and Bytom. This lady married Sir Simon Bigod de Felbrigg in Essex, the standard bearer of Richard II and their daughter, Alana, married Sir William Tyndall of Deene.

It has already been related that, through the Felbriggs, the Tyndalls came to be co-heirs to the Barony of Scales with the Earls of Oxford. However, a more regal dignity descended through Margaret of Teschen when the House of Luxemburg died out with the death of Sigismund, Holy Roman Emperor and King of Bohemia (1368–1437) and Sir William Tyndall became one of the heirs to the elective throne of Bohemia. John Nichols relates that a delegation of Bohemian boyars were sent to England to offer him the throne but that he refused, the Habsburgs succeeding to a throne they held (with one interruption) until 1918.

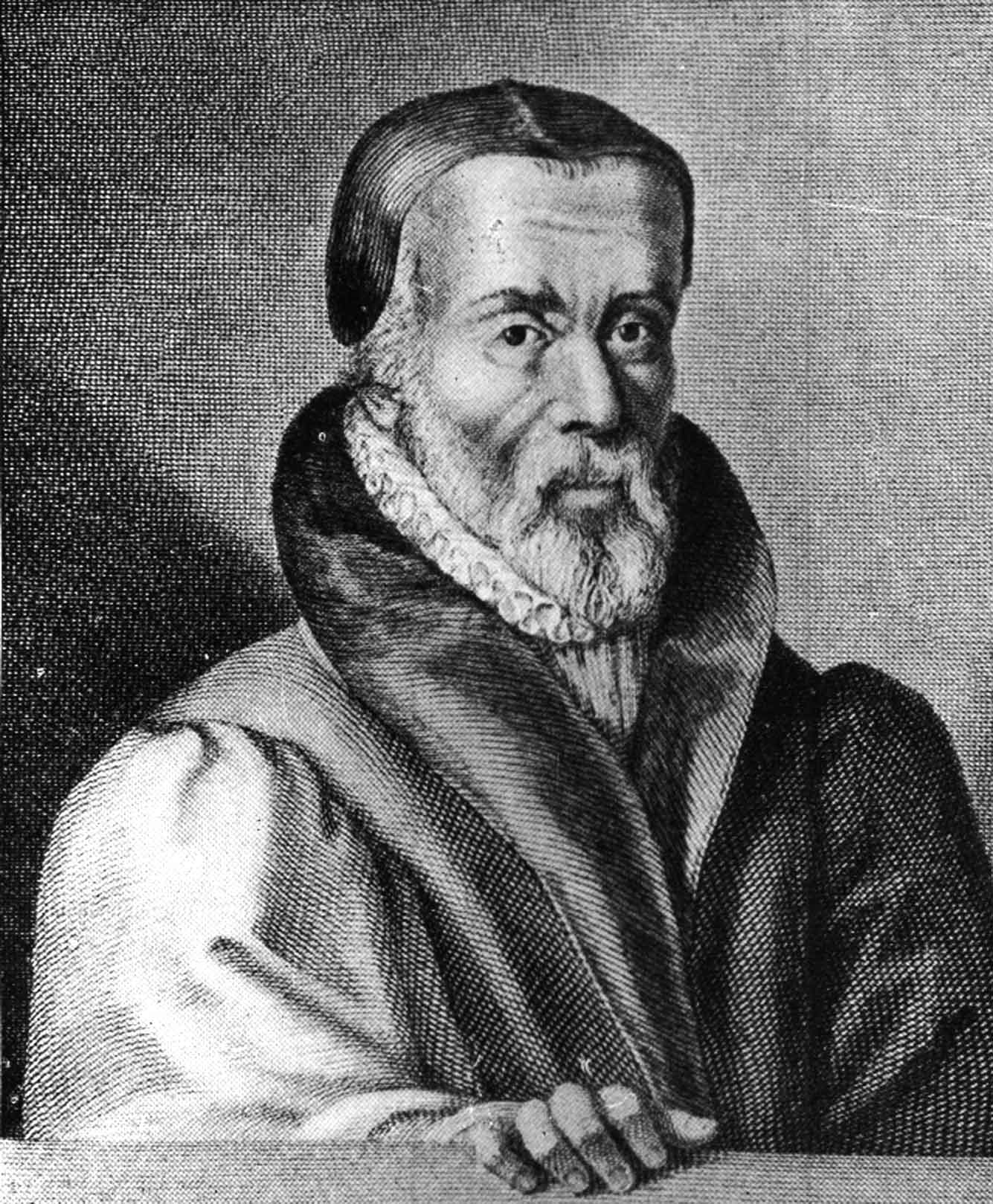
William Tyndale

There was an oral tradition at the University of Cambridge that Humphrey Tyndall, brother of Sir John Tyndall of Mapplestead and uncle (or great uncle) of the eminent deist Dr Matthew Tindal, was again offered the throne by the Protestant party in Bohemia in 1620. This Humphrey was Dean of Ely and president of Queens' College, Cambridge and vice-chancellor of Cambridge University. Humphrey refused, saying that "he had rather be Queen Elizabeth's subject than a foreign Prince", leading to the ill-fated Frederick V, Elector Palatine (married to Elizabeth, daughter of James I) becoming King for a year – a development that was a principal cause of the thirty years war. However, Humphrey Tyndall died in 1614.

=== William Tyndale ===
The most eminent member of the family, William Tyndale (c. 1494 – 1536), was the first translator of the Bible into modern English. His great work was also one of the first vernacular Bibles to be derived from the primary Hebrew and Greek texts. Its effect on the English church was electrifying, leading to thousands of Bibles being smuggled into England; Tyndale's individual contribution to the linguistic development of the modern English language perhaps ranks as second only to that of Shakespeare. Aside from his life work, Tyndale was a prodigious pamphleteer, propounding a Protestant agenda that was significantly more radical than that of his protector, Martin Luther. His radicalism, prodigious output and written battles with Thomas More eventually led to his capture near Antwerp, after which he was burnt at the stake as a heretic. He is regarded as a martyr in the Church of England and his death is commemorated in the Book of Common Prayer.

Born in Gloucestershire, William Tyndale is known to have been the brother of Edward Tyndale of Pull Court, Gloucestershire, receiver to the lands of Lord Berkeley based on the 1533 letter of Bishop Stokesley of London. However, all that can be surmised from data available is that William was related to Richard Tyndale and Tabitha Hitchins of Melksham Court and had brothers John and Edward the confessor, the Receiver of Berkley, but most certainly was NOT of the line of Tyndale of Hockwold. (Although Edward Tyndale is recorded in two genealogies as having been the 'brother of Sir William de Tyndall of Deane and Hockwold' but that William died after 1542 so they were in error on the relationship with that William (but suggesting that he was connected to this branch of the family somehow), that myth was broken and the suggestion dismissed in "The Memoirs of the extinct family of Chesters of Chicheley" as well as in The Genealogy of the Family of Tyndale (by B. W. Greenfield, 1843) and The Biography of William Tyndale.)

=== Ralph Dundas Tindal, a Napoleonic and later Dutch Baron ===
General Ralph Dundas Tindal (Deventer, 24 February 1773, – Zeist, 4 August 1834) served in the Netherlands military, and in French service. His father (whose family was of Scottish origin) had emigrated to Holland and had also served in Dutch service. Whilst in French imperial service, Ralph Dundas Tindal was created Baron de Tindal on 12 April 1813 by the French Emperor Napoleon (Bonaparte). Later he joined Dutch forces and became lieutenant-general in the infantry, and on 8 July 1815, King William I of the Netherlands bestowed a knightly order on him, the Willems-Orde. On 16 September 1815 he was raised in the Dutch nobility, again with the title baron.

== The Tindal/Tindal-Carill-Worsley family ==
=== Derivation ===
The senior branch of the English Tyndall family, last seated at Mapplestead Magna in the 17th century, died out in the direct male line in the 17th century and in the female line over a hundred years later. The senior English branch is thus the Tindal (now Tindal-Carill-Worsley) family, whose history is related in the 1973 volume of Burke's Landed Gentry. This family derived from Rev John Tindal, rector of Bere Ferris, Devon, in the mid-17th century, said (in the Nichols genealogy) to have been the younger son of Sir John Tyndall of Mapplestead, the brother of Dean Humphrey Tyndall, president of Queens' College, Cambridge.

There is, however, support for the contention that Rev. John was the son of Sir John's elder son Dean. Rev John's migration to Devon (after his studies for Holy Orders) was typical of the many migrations of the Tyndall/Tyndale/Tindal/Tindell family since the late 15th century. The use of 'Tindal' represents a more Latinised usage which was common amongst many literary figures in this era and there is evidence that it was first used by his sons, Matthew (1657–1733), Thomas (1658–1714) and Richard (1659–1697). Matthew had been described as 'Tyndall' when at Oxford University in 1688; two of his brothers, Thomas and Richard, emigrated to Fenwick's Colony in 1674 and his other brother, John, was the father of Rev Nicolas Tindal (see below). . Rev John Tindal married Ann Hals, who was descended from the Fortescue and Clifford families and was the first cousin of Thomas, Lord Clifford, Lord High Treasurer of England to Charles II. Through this connection and those of Diana Pocklington, the wife of Capt George Tindal, RN, Lord Chief Justice Tindal (see below) was descended from Lords Chief Justices Sir William Yelverton and Sir John Fortescue and from Sir Roger Manwood, Lord Chief Baron of the Exchequer.

=== Philosopher, historian and judge ===
Rev Nicolas Tindal. The Tindal arms shown are those of Deane, whom the Tindal/Tyndale family represent, together with the ancient crest of Tyndall

Dr Matthew Tindal (1657–1733), a Fellow of All Souls College, Oxford, where he lived for most of his life, was an important figure in the early English Enlightenment. Born during the Commonwealth to the above-mentioned Rev John Tindal, he appears to have been an opportunist in his youth, turning to Rome under James II. However, he later wrote the foundation of English deist thought, Christianity as Old as the Creation, later known as the "Deist's Bible". This seminal tract, which had enduring influence on German deism in particular, represented that no true religion could rely on any doctrines that could not be divined through human reason. Thus, Christianity, if a true religion, has no need of revelation to support its dogmas and must be as old as the Creation. His writings provoked scandal and his book was burned by the public hangman, in addition to provoking a number of replies.

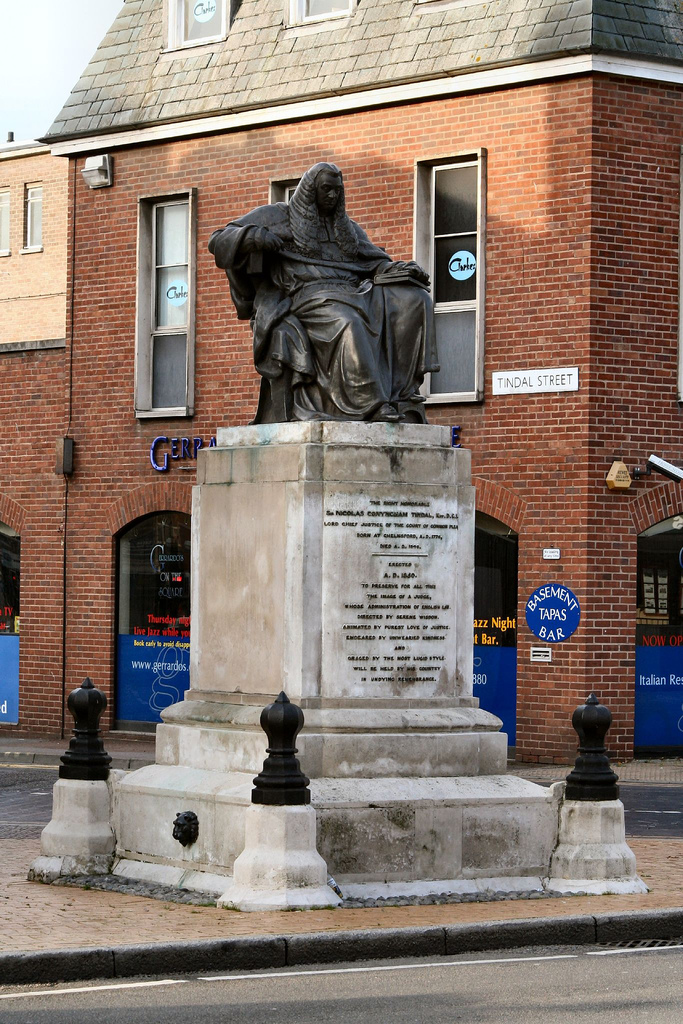
Statue of Sir Nicolas Tindal

Dr Tindal's nephew, Rev Nicolas Tindal (1687–1774), was the translator and continuer of the History of England by Paul de Rapin. Very few comprehensive histories existed at the time and Tindal wrote a three volume "Continuation", a history of the Kingdom from the reign of James II to that of George II. Something of a controversialist, he was also known for having been defrauded of his uncle's inheritance by Eustace Brugnell, leading to some lines of Alexander Pope. Rector of two livings, Chaplain of Greenwich Hospital and a Fellow of Trinity College, Oxford, Tindal was sufficiently prosperous to allow his son, Capt George Tindal RN to settle in Coval Hall, Chelmsford.

Capt George Tindal's grandson, Rev William Tindal (1756–1804), was a Fellow of Trinity College, Oxford and chaplain of the Tower of London. An antiquarian, he published a history of Evesham Abbey.

Another of George's grandsons, Sir Nicolas Conyngham Tindal (1776–1846), was Lord Chief Justice from 1829 to 1845. His career first came to public notice when he acted for Queen Caroline in the famous attempt of George IV to divorce her in the House of Lords. Shortly afterwards, he was elected to Parliament, serving as Solicitor General for five years. Whilst Lord Chief Justice, he sat in the famous case of Daniel M'Naghten, who had attempted to assassinate Robert Peel, and derived from the common law the defence of insanity.

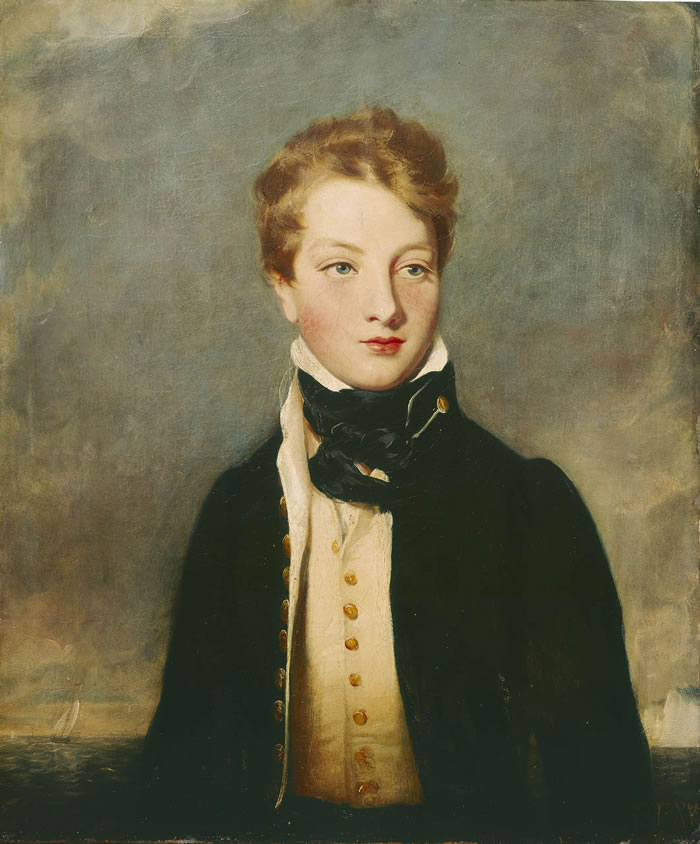
Louis Symonds Tindal as a midshipman.

Sir Nicolas's second son, Vice Admiral Louis Symonds Tindal (1810–1876), joined the Royal Navy as a boy, in 1825 and had an adventurous, wide-ranging and distinguished career. Promoted lieutenant in 1832, by 1836 he was in the sloop 'Vestal' on the North American station and later the sloop 'Calliope' on the South American station. In 1841 he was in China, where he was present at the Battle of Chuenpi, the storming of Wampea reach and at attacks on Canton. In recognition of his role in these raids, he was promoted commander that year and given command of the sloop 'Pylades', which he brought home from the east in 1843. In 1846 he commanded the brig-sloop 'Grecian' to open the South American station, returning in 1849. He was promoted captain in 1852, rear-admiral in 1868 and vice-admiral in 1874.

=== Australian Tindals ===
Sir Nicolas's youngest brother, Charles, a commander in the Royal Navy, became Governor of the Bank of England in the west of England. His son, Charles Grant Tindal (1823–1914) was a successful cattle breeder, meat processor and landowner. Having started his career on explorations of New South Wales, he leased a cattle station before buying the Ramornie station on the Orana River, near Grafton in NSW. In addition to cattle breeding, he was a highly successful breeder of racehorses, both in Australia and England, where he retained his father's property of Fir Grove, Hampshire. At its peak, Charles's meat processing company slaughtered 35,000 beasts a year and was well established on the English market.

Charles's descendants remain in Australia to this day (although several Australian Tyndalls descend from the Irish branch of the family). One, Wing Cdr Archibald Tindal, who was killed during the bombing of Darwin on 19 February 1942, became the first RAAF airman to be killed on the Australian mainland during World War II. After the war, Carson's Airfield, located approximately 320 km (199 mi) south-east from Darwin, was renamed RAAF Base Tindal in his honour.

=== Modern era ===
Nicolas Tindal-Carill-Worsley

Sir Nicolas ultimately left no descendants in the male line, though a branch of the Bosanquet family are his descendants and Reginald Bosanquet, the broadcaster for ITN, was his great-great-grandson. Members of the main branch of the English family descend from his brother, Thomas Tindal of Aylesbury, Clerk of the Peace for Buckinghamshire. He married Anne, the daughter of Acton Chaplin, Clerk of the Peace for Buckinghamshire. Chaplin was a great-great-grandson of Sir Francis Chaplin, Lord Mayor of London in 1677 and the great-grandfather of Sir Arthur Havelock, Governor of Sierra Leone and Tasmania. Thomas's son, Acton Tindal, Lord of the manor of Aylesbury, married Henrietta Euphemia Harrison, an eminent poet and descendant of Francis Turner, one of the seven Bishops to defy James II and his Declaration of Indulgences, Sir Francis Windebank, Secretary of State to Charles I, and Sir Edmund Plowden, the eminent Elizabethan jurist. Acton's son, Nicolas, married Elizabeth Carill-Worsley, heiress of Platt Hall near Manchester and the family adopted the name Tindal-Carill-Worsley. Elizabeth was a descendant of Erasmus Darwin, the 2nd Earl of Portmore, the Lord Monteagle who foiled the Gunpowder Plot and Charles Worsley of Platt, one of Oliver Cromwell's most trusted Major Generals, to whom was entrusted the Mace when Cromwell famously cried 'rid me of that bauble' in expelling the House of Commons in 1652.

The current head of the English family is Charles Tindal of Ballyloughan (he does not use 'Carill-Worsley'), son of Group Captain Nicolas Tindal-Carill-Worsley (1911–2006), a bomber pilot during World War II and one of the organisers of the "Great Escape" from Stalag Luft III. His brother, Anthony, son, Matthew and niece and nephew William and Harriet together run Tindal Wines in England and Ireland.

(See also Darwin–Wedgwood family)

== Irish branch and distinguished individuals ==
=== Derivation ===
A branch of the family settled in Ireland in the Middle Ages, and manuscript genealogical records of these exist in Trinity College Dublin. The family originated in Gloucestershire and were closely related to William Tyndale, the Bible translator. Another William Tyndall is mentioned in the 1659 census as living in Duganstowne, Catherlagh (County Carlow), co-owned by him and a Richard Andrewes as tituladoes. Similarly, a John Tyndall came from Gloucestershire to Ireland during the Wars of Rebellion and had a grant of land confirmed to him in 1668. He married Isabelle de Rinzy of County Wexford.

Amongst the landed gentry in Ireland in the 19th century, Tyndalls appeared established with estates and seats at Ballyanne House, and Berkeley Forest, both in New Ross, County Wexford, and Prospect Hall, County Kilkenny, as well as in County Carlow, and Kildevin, County Westmeath, and Dublin City. Samuel Tyndall served as Lord Mayor of Dublin from 1826 to 1827. E.L. Tyndall was a Knight Grand Cordon, 6th Class, of the Order of the Sacred Treasure of Japan (founded by the Emperor Meiji (Mutsuhito) on 8 January 1888)

=== Prominent Irish Tyndalls ===
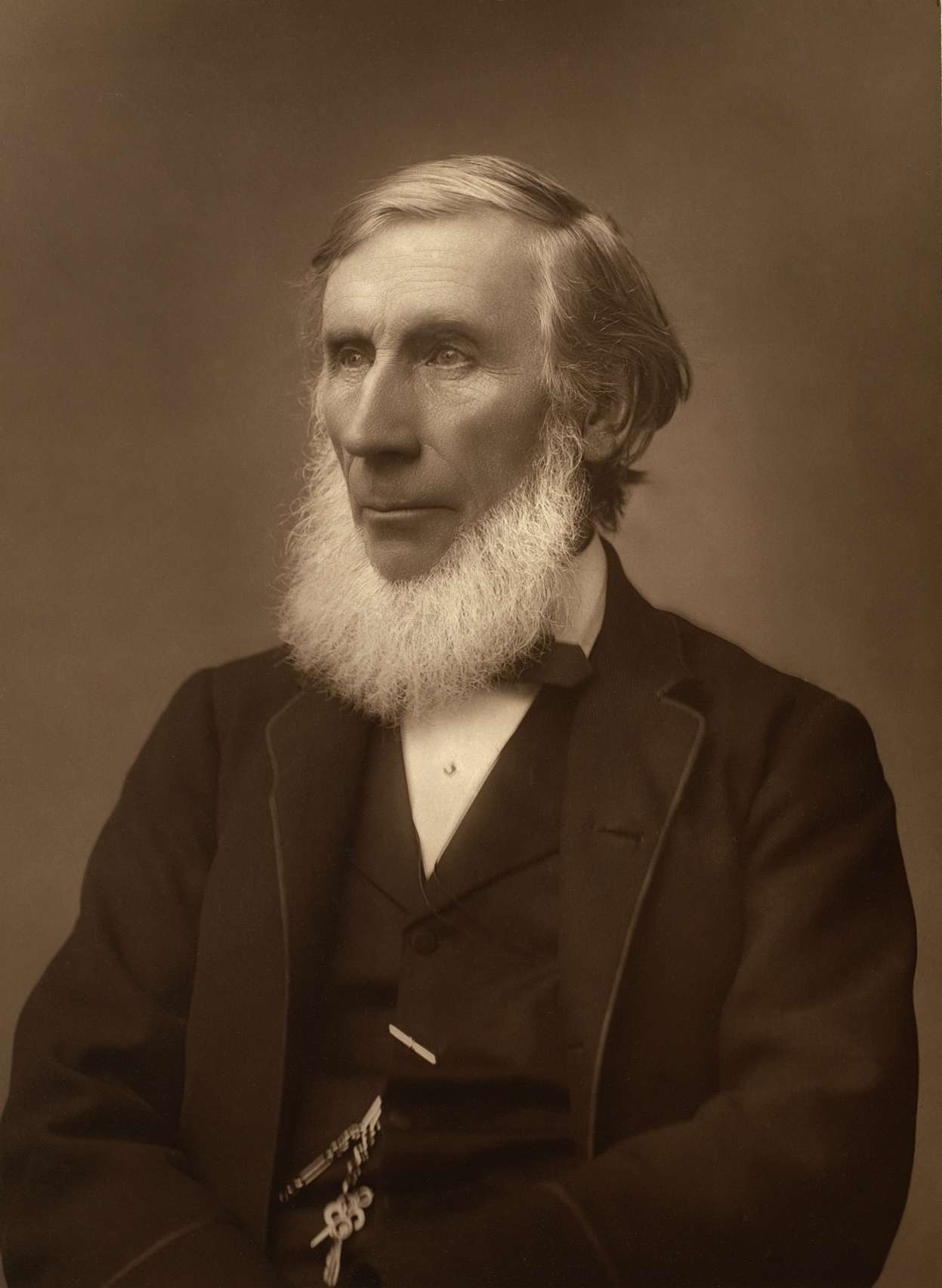
John Tyndall

John Tyndall (1820–1893) from Leighlinbridge, County Carlow, Ireland, a staunch Protestant Unionist, was a well-known physicist from Ireland, who discovered the Tyndall effect. A relative, another John Tyndall of Newcastle ran a forge, coachmaking and saddlery, in the middle of the 19th century, and his grandson, David P. Tyndall (1890–1970), from Chapelizod, became a prominent Irish businessman in the 20th century, who founded the firm D. Tyndall & Sons, as well as several other companies, and consolidated and modernised the wholesale trade sector, introducing the SPAR chain into Ireland.

John Hutchyns Tyndall (1934–2005) born Exeter, Devon, England, was a British politician who was involved in a number of nationalist movements in post-war Britain, best known for leading the National Front in the 1970s and founding the contemporary British National Party (BNP) in 1982. His paternal family were Protestant Unionists from County Waterford, his ancestors having settled in Ireland in the 16th century. His grandfather had been a district inspector in the Royal Irish Constabulary.

Other lines of the Irish branch of the family have spread to Australia and the USA.

== Tyndall-named institutions and places ==
- England: The Tyndall Centre for Climate Change Research has locations in the University of East Anglia in Norwich, the University of Manchester, the University of Southampton, the University of Sussex in Brighton, Oxford University, and the University of Newcastle upon Tyne. 'Tindal Square' in Chelmsford is named after Sir Nicolas Conyngham Tindal. 'Tindal Hospital', Aylesbury, is named after the family of Thomas and Acton Tindal, Lords of the Manor of Aylesbury. A branch of the Tyndall family settled in Bristol, and created Tyndall's Park in the 18th century; they built Royal Fort House, now part of the campus of the University of Bristol: there is a Tyndall lecture theatre and, nearby, a road named Tyndall Avenue.
- Republic of Ireland: In honour of physicist John Tyndall, the Tyndall National Institute was created in Ireland in 2004 at the initiative of the Department of Enterprise Trade and Employment and University College Cork (UCC) to bring together complementary activities in photonics, electronics and networking research at the National Microelectronics Research Centre (NMRC), several UCC academic departments and Cork Institute of Technology (CIT).
- New Zealand: The Tyndall name has lent itself to an important investment fund management enterprise.
- USA: Tyndall Air Force Base, named for World War I flying ace Lt. Frank B. Tyndall, is located in Bay County, Florida. The small city of Tyndall, South Dakota, named for John Tyndall, is the county seat of Bon Homme County. Tyndall Glacier in Colorado is also named after John Tyndall.
- Australia: Royal Australian Air Force Base Tindal, in the Northern Territory is named after Wing Cmdr Archibald Tindal, the first Australian airman to be killed on the Australian mainland in World War II (see above under Tindal/Tindal-Carill-Worsley family).
- Canada: The town of Tyndall, Manitoba. Tyndall stone is the name of a limestone often used in construction and decoration in Manitoba.
- A crater on Mars is named after John Tyndall.

== In The United States ==
Richard Tindall continued as surveyor-general of Fenwick's Colony following the sale of the Salem Tenth to William Penn in 1682. His brother Thomas Tindall was the first purchaser of land in Hopewell, New Jersey and had many children.

- Tindall, Missouri is named for Union Army colonel Jacob T. Tindall.

First Lieutenant (Air Service) Frank Benjamin Tyndall, United States Army Air Service flew as an ace fighter pilot with 22d Aero Squadron. By direction of the president, under the provisions of the act of Congress approved 9 July 1918 (Bul. No. 43, W.D., 1918), LT. Frank B. Tyndall is cited by the commanding general, American Expeditionary Forces, for gallantry in action and a Silver Star may be placed upon the ribbon of the Victory Medals awarded him. First Lieutenant Tyndall distinguished himself by gallantry in action while serving with the 22d Aero Squadron, American Expeditionary Forces, in action near Conflans, France, 29 October 1918, in pursuing an enemy Fokker far within the enemy's lines and bringing it down. After the war was over he worked with Boeing on loan from the government as a consultant and test pilot. During one of his test flights his plane had a mechanical failure and he had to bail out. As a result, he was the second Airman to successfully survive using a parachute. He died 15 July 1930 after the plane he was flying crashed. Ten years later Tyndall Air Force Base was named in his honour. He was survived by his wife Grace Tyndall and his daughter Mary Tyndall.

== Notes ==
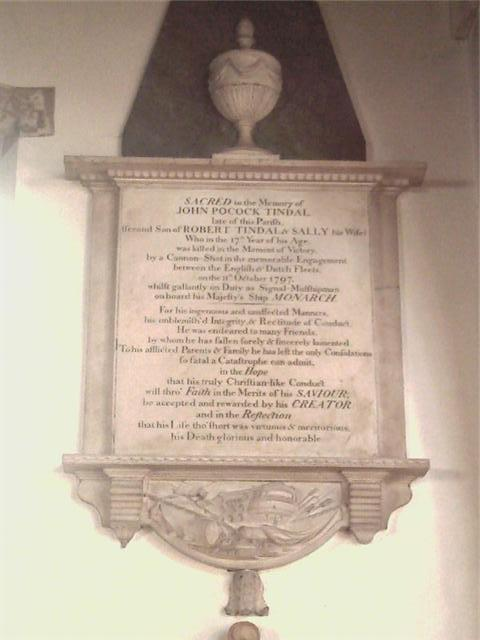
Memorial to John Pocock Tindal, RN, brother of Sir Nicolas Tindal, at Chelmsford Cathedral

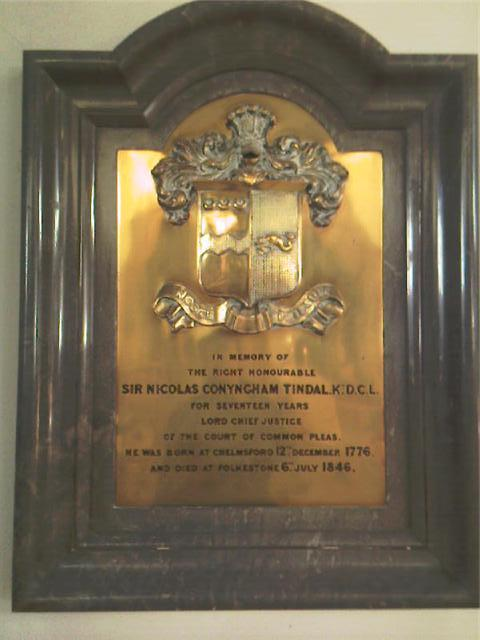
Memorial to Sir Nicolas Tindal at Chelmsford Cathedral
