= Nicholas Conyngham Tindal =

English lawyer

The Right Honourable Sir Nicolas Conyngham Tindal PC
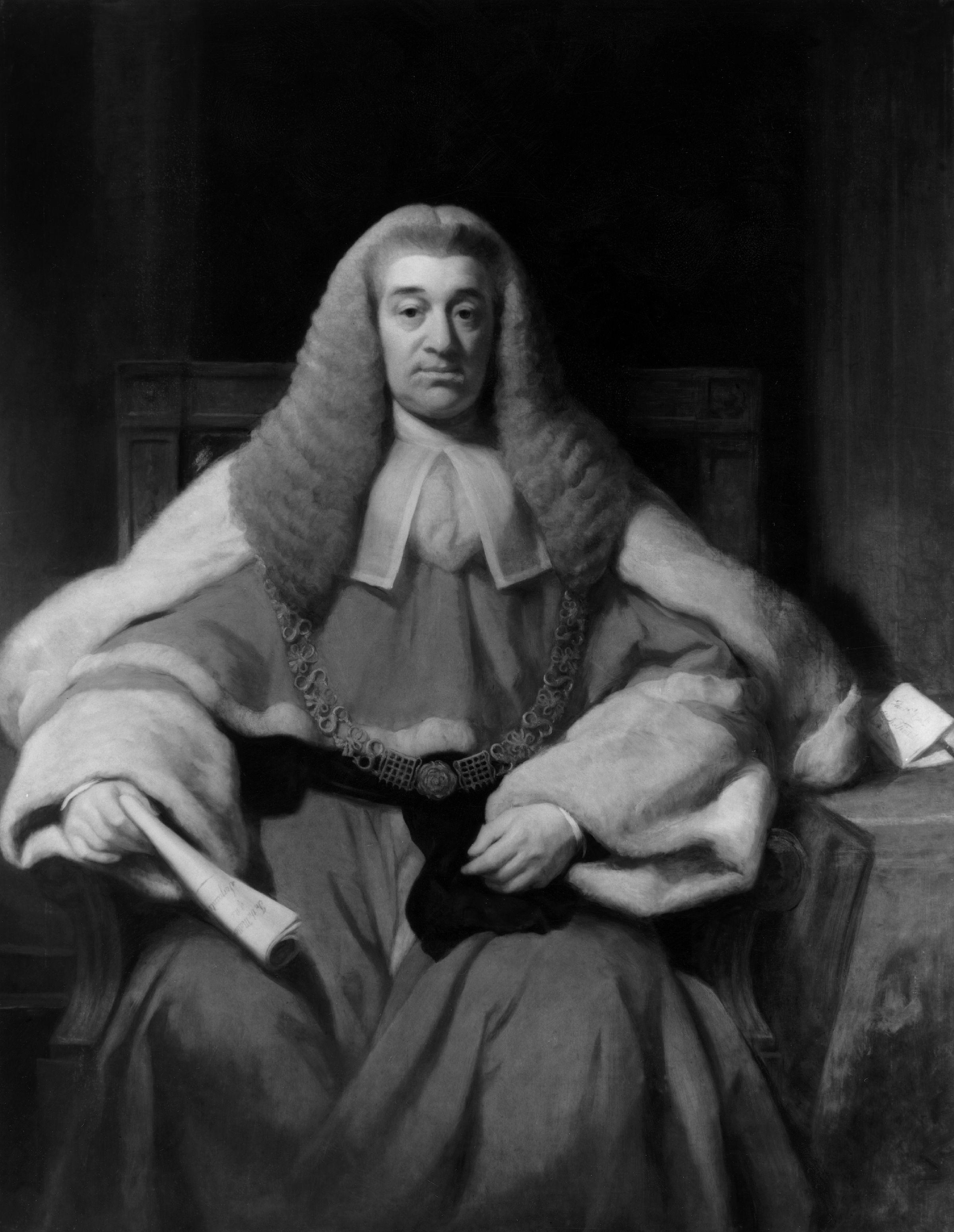
- Portrait of Sir Nicolas Conyngham Tindal by Sir Thomas Phillips RA, now in the Great Hall of Lincoln's Inn.
- Born: 12 December 1776; Moulsham, Chelmsford, England
- Died: 6 July 1846 (aged 69)
- Monuments: Commemorative plaque at birthplace; Statue at Chelmsford; Portrait at Lincoln's Inn; Portrait at Royal Courts of Justice; Memorial at Chelmsford Cathedral
- Education: King Edward VI Grammar School (Chelmsford)
- Alma mater: Trinity College, Cambridge
- Occupations: Lawyer; Chief Justice of the Court of Common Pleas; Solicitor General
- Known for: Defended Caroline of Brunswick; Introduction of the insanity defence
- Relatives: Nicolas Tindal (great-grandfather), Matthew Tindal (great great grand-uncle), Adela Maddison, grand-daughter, Reginald Bosanquet (great great grandson)

Sir Nicolas Conyngham Tindal, PC (12 December 1776 – 6 July 1846) was an English lawyer who successfully defended the then Queen of the United Kingdom, Caroline of Brunswick, at her trial for adultery in 1820. As Chief Justice of Common Pleas, an office he held with distinction from 1829 to 1846, he was responsible for the inception of the special verdict "Not Guilty by reason of insanity" at the trial of Daniel M'Naghten.

Tindal was born in the Moulsham area of Chelmsford, where 199 Moulsham Street is today, and the site is marked with a commemorative plaque.

== Background ==
Tindal's father, Robert Tindal, was an attorney in Chelmsford, where his family had lived at Coval Hall for three generations. His great-grandfather, Nicolas Tindal, was the translator and continuer of the History of England by Paul de Rapin – a seminal work in its day – and he was also the great-great-grandnephew of Matthew Tindal, the deist and author of Christianity as Old as the Creation (known as the 'deist's bible') and descendant of Thomas Clifford, 1st Baron Clifford of Chudleigh.

Nicholas's branch of the Tindal family were descended from John Tindal, Rector of Bere Ferris in Devon during the Commonwealth of England and who has been claimed as the son either of Dean Tyndall or of (his father) John Tyndall, both of Maplestead, Essex. John Nichols, in the 18th century, set out a genealogy maintaining that the family derived from Baron Adam de Tyndale of Langley Castle, Northumberland, a tenant-in-chief of Henry II, though this has been challenged Through this line, Tindal would have been collaterally descended from William Tyndale, translator of the Bible into English.

Tindal was descended from a number of great legal figures, all of whom were members of Lincoln's Inn. John Fortescue, was a great medieval jurist and Lord Chancellor of Henry VI of England; William Yelverton was an earlier Lord Chief Justice of England; Roger Manwood was an Elizabethan Lord Chief Baron of the Exchequer; and his nephew, John Manwood, Nicholas's great-great-great-grandfather, was the author of "the Forest Laws" (see also Tyndall).

== Career ==
Tindal was educated at King Edward VI Grammar School in his home town of Chelmsford, and later at Trinity College, Cambridge, where he graduated eighth Wrangler in 1799 and was elected fellow in 1801. A statue to him stands in his home town, and a house at his old school is now dedicated to his memory.

Called to the Bar in Lincoln's Inn in 1810 (having practised as a Special Pleader for many years, as was then customary), Tindal soon attained a reputation for his learning. In 1818, as counsel in the appeal of Ashford v Thornton, he successfully argued that Thornton was entitled to trial by battle. It does not appear that his success in the law was followed by success in the battlefield for his client, however, who was deprived of the opportunity by his accuser's unwillingness and a change in the law.

Elected Tory Member of Parliament for the Scottish constituency of Wigtown Burghs from 1824 to 1826; he was MP for Harwich in 1826 before serving as the member for Cambridge University in 1827. Tindal served as Solicitor General from 1826 to 1829, when he was appointed to the bench.

An example of Tindal's learning can be found in his speech to the House of Commons in 1826 on a motion to allow counsel to the defence to make a closing speech. Although his conclusion would find little favour today, Tindal demonstrated an appreciation of the role of prosecuting counsel as a minister of justice and the influences of counsel on a jury that would be recognised by any criminal practitioner in the 21st century. Almost as an afterthought, Tindal added a passionate defence of the 'anomalies' of English law that, in his opinion and that of so many others before and since, are its greatest attributes.

On the bench, Tindal's greatest achievement was to reform significantly the application of the criminal law. By introducing to the common law the special verdict of "Not Guilty by reason of insanity" and of the defence (to murder) of provocation, he left a legacy that remains to this day. Daniel M'Naghten had assassinated Edward Drummond, secretary to Robert Peel (then Prime Minister), but there was no doubt that he was seriously mentally ill and he was acquitted in a verdict so sensational that Queen Victoria herself called for him to be retried in the House of Lords. Whilst this undoubtedly offended the principle of double jeopardy, the House called upon a panel of judges, headed by Tindal, to advise them on the course to take where defendants committed crimes whilst insane. This advice, leading to the special verdict, remains the foundation of the law of insanity throughout the English common law world.

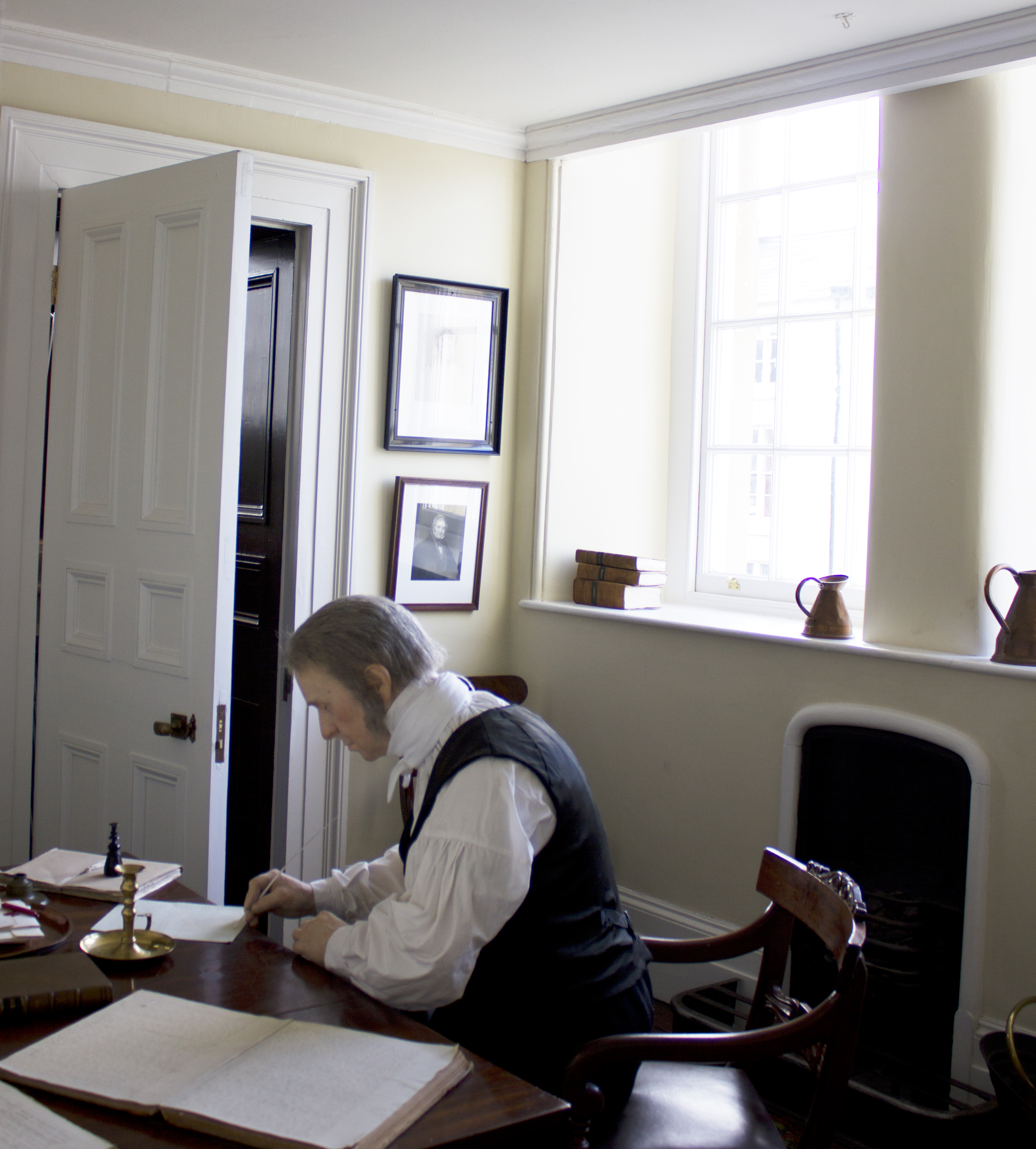
Mannequin of Judge Tindal in the Shire Hall at Monmouth commemorating a famous Chartist trial

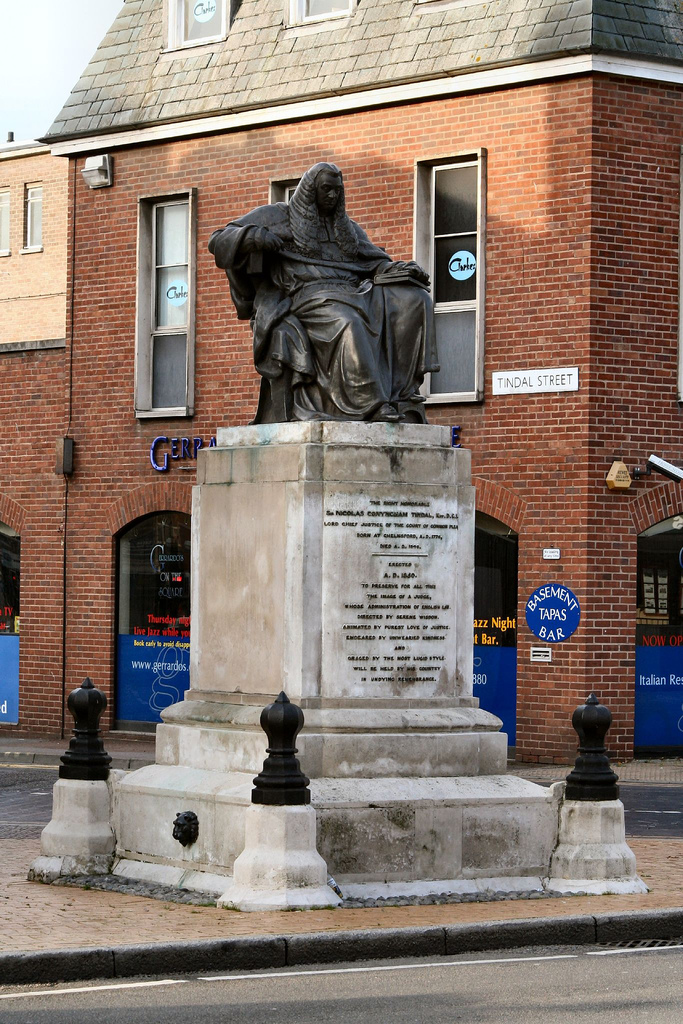
Statue of Nicolas Tindal, Tindal Square Chelmsford.

He directed the jury in the case of the Bristol riots on the rejection of the reform bill in 1831 with the duties at common law to suppress tumultuary meetings. In the case of Regina v Hale, Tindal ruled that, where a defendant was provoked to such a degree that any reasonable man would lose his self-control and then killed the person responsible for that provocation, the defendant would be guilty only of manslaughter. This judgment has also stood the test of time and is the basis of the common law defence of provocation and was incorporated into section 3 of the Homicide Act 1957.

The significance of these judgments was to remove the spectre of the noose from many vulnerable prisoners in an era of the widespread application of the death penalty; and to reform the law through the greater recognition of the importance of differing states of mind (mens rea) in those accused of the most serious crimes. In the context of the century that produced William Wilberforce, the Earl of Shaftesbury and Benjamin Disraeli, Tindal's reforms to the cruel application of the criminal law deserve to be remembered as social reforms of great importance.

Towards the end of his career, Tindal yet again demonstrated the quality that was to lead to his great popularity amongst the public; namely, his high standard of judicial independence from the state and the wide ambit and discretion he would give to juries. In the case of Frost (1839–40), a prisoner had escaped and led 5,000 armed men into Newport, where they shot at regular troops. Directing the jury to consider charges of treason, Tindal said that, were Frost's motives only to free local Chartists from jail, as opposed to intimidating Parliament into enacting radical constitutional reform, they should find him guilty of riot only. Whilst Frost was ultimately convicted, Tindal's direction differed from the legal practice of many of his brother judges at the time and since.

== Marriage and family ==
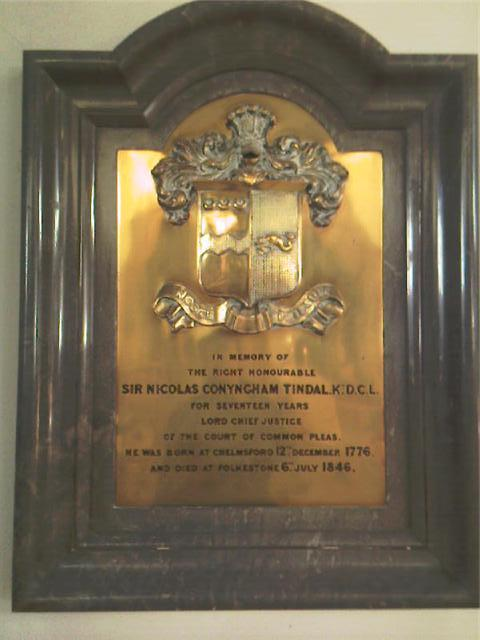
Memorial to Nicolas Tindal at Chelmsford Cathedral

Tindal married Merelina, daughter of Capt. Thomas Symonds, in 1809 and had four children, Vice Admiral Louis Symonds Tindal (father of composer Adela Maddison), Rev Nicholas Tindal (Rector of Chelmsford) (whose daughter Adela-Rose-Ellen married Surgeon General Sir James Mouat VC CB), Charles Tindal and Merelina Tindal (who married James Whatman Bosanquet of Claysmore and amongst whose descendants was the broadcaster Reginald Bosanquet).

He died 6 July 1846 in Folkestone; is buried at Kensal Green Cemetery in north London, and is commemorated by a plaque inside Chelmsford Cathedral (alongside memorials to other members of his family). In addition to his statue at Chelmsford, there is a portrait of him by Thomas Phillips, RA (1770–1845) in the Hall at Lincoln's Inn and another in the judges quarters of the Royal Courts of Justice.

== Notes ==
Chelmsford Museum holds a portrait by John Lucas (1807–1874), and portraits of his parents Robert Tindal, by John Jackson (1778–1831) and Sally Tindal, née Pocock (by an unknown artist).

Parliament of the United Kingdom
Preceded by John Osborn	Member of Parliament for Wigtown Burghs; 1824–1826	Succeeded by John Henry Lowther
Preceded by George Canning; John Charles Herries	Member of Parliament for Harwich; 1826–1827; With: John Charles Herries	Succeeded by John Charles Herries; William Rae
Preceded by Henry Temple, 3rd Viscount Palmerston; John Singleton Copley	Member of Parliament for Cambridge University; 1827–1829; With: Henry Temple, 3rd Viscount Palmerston	Succeeded by Henry Temple, 3rd Viscount Palmerston; William Cavendish
Legal offices
Preceded by Charles Wetherell	Solicitor General for England and Wales; 1826–1829	Succeeded by Edward Sugden
Preceded by William Best	Chief Justice of the Court of Common Pleas; 1829–1846	Succeeded by Thomas Wilde
