= History of England (Ralph) =

1740s history book by James Ralph

The History of England, During the Reigns of King William, Queen Anne, and King George I
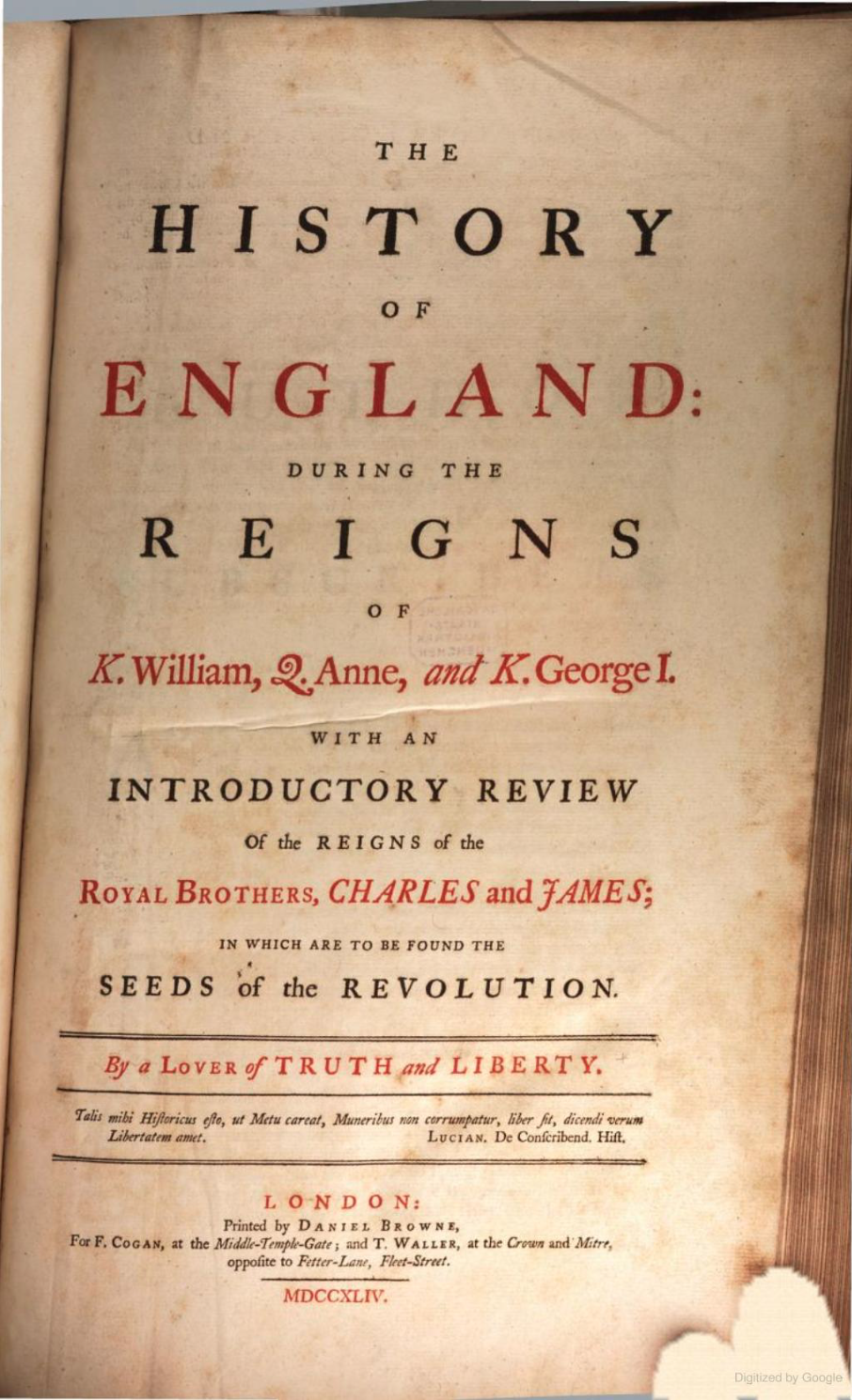
- Author: James Ralph
- Language: English
- Subject: British history
- Genre: Narrative history
- Publication date: 1744–1746
- Publication place: Great Britain
- Media type: Print (folio)
- Pages: 2 vols (c. 1,200 pp.)

The History of England, During the Reigns of King William, Queen Anne, and King George I is a two-volume survey of late-Stuart and early-Hanoverian politics by the journalist James Ralph. Issued by subscription in 1744 and 1746, it narrates events from the Glorious Revolution (1688) to the death of George I (1727), prefaced by a substantial review of the reigns of Charles II and James II. The book appeared amid a spate of rival, politically sponsored histories in the 1740s.

The work advances a constitutionalist opposition stance associated with the circle around Frederick, Prince of Wales, coupling arguments about liberty and the integrity of the British constitution with an unusual emphasis on public finance as a driver of political change. It criticises measures such as the Occasional Conformity legislation and peacetime standing armies, and affirms monarchy limited by law. Methodologically it makes systematic use of state papers, manuscript collections (notably the Somers and Halifax papers), and fiscal returns—customs and excise ledgers, national-debt tables, and army/militia musters—to test and correct partisan narratives. It also engages closely with earlier general histories, especially Burnet’s History of His Own Time.

Reception at the time was limited and mixed, and the project was commercially unsuccessful; later readers, however, praised its diligence and detail. Nineteenth-century figures such as Henry Hallam and Charles James Fox rated it highly, and modern scholars have highlighted its breadth, documentary method, and treatment of the Glorious Revolution. The book circulated in Britain and North America, where its constitutional arguments were echoed in revolutionary-era pamphleteering.

== Publication ==
The work was issued by subscription at one guinea a set, in two folio volumes—vol. I in March 1744 and vol. II in May 1746—and it appeared serially across those years. Volume I is dedicated to Horatio Walpole.

The book appeared during a crowded decade for English histories, alongside Nicholas Tindal’s continuation of Rapin and large general histories by Thomas Carte and William Guthrie, aided by newly printed collections of state papers such as the Ormonde Papers (1739), Thomas Birch’s seven-volume Thurloe State Papers (1742), the Strafford Letters (1739), and the Sidney Papers (1746).

It formed part of competing partisan enterprises of the 1740s: a Country-Whig project pairing Guthrie’s General History (to 1688), backed by Chesterfield, with Ralph’s post-Revolution History, backed by George Bubb Dodington, set against the continuation of Rapin backed by Lord Hardwicke. The coordinated plan is documented by early-1744 correspondence describing Ralph’s book as a “counterpart” to the Hardwicke undertaking.

Rooted in opposition journalism, the scheme drew on the Country-Whig papers Common Sense and Old England and extended their anti-ministerial programme in a more scholarly register. The History itself appeared serially between 1744 and 1746.

During this period, when Dodington entered the Broad Bottom ministry (1744), Ralph received a Treasury pension of £200 per year. Guthrie’s companion General History began appearing in early 1744 and was completed in 1751; the Pelham ministry then pensioned him at £200 a year to silence opposition writing.

== Contents and themes ==
The History covers 1688–1727, from the Glorious Revolution to the death of George I. It opens with a roughly ninety-page “Review of the Reigns of the Royal Brothers Charles and James,” which frames 1688 as a constitutional watershed.

The narrative aligns with the constitutionalist (“Broad Bottom”) opposition associated with the Prince of Wales, advancing principles of liberty, the integrity of the British constitution, Parliament as its guardian, and ultimate popular sovereignty; these are framed as non-partisan and later echoed in American revolutionary rhetoric. In its preface the work names a second aim—“to detect … the evil of parties”—and depicts political corruption and electoral manipulation (including patronage) as threats to the constitution, with Walpole’s administration presented as overstepping constitutional bounds. Alongside its constitutional argument, the work treats public finance as a driver of political change, using customs and excise ledgers, debt tables, and troop returns to ground its analysis.

A dual emphasis on liberty and fiscal health informs its criticism of both Whig and Tory ministries without strict alignment to either. Specific measures criticised as contrary to liberty include the Occasional Conformity Bill and restrictions on the press; the book also defends the liberty of the stage as akin to press freedom. It opposes a standing army in peacetime (favouring a militia), censures William III for giving statutory sanction to a peacetime standing army during the Standing Army Controversy, faults Parliament for normalising it, and rejects Walpole’s 1733–1734 troop arguments as unconstitutional. While warning against excessive royal prerogative, the work affirms loyalty to a monarchy limited by law.

In framing 1688, the History treats the Glorious Revolution as the culmination of developments since the Restoration and places it in a European context. William of Orange is presented chiefly as aligning England against France to secure Dutch independence rather than as a national “deliverer,” and James II is said to have come close to reshaping the monarchy. His failure is attributed to late Church resistance, diplomatic circumstance, William’s opportunism, and the efforts of a few principled politicians.

The research draws on both printed sources and extensive manuscripts—especially the papers and pamphlet collections of John Somers and the letters and journals of the Earl of Halifax—alongside state papers and fiscal returns, used systematically to test and correct partisan narratives of the previous half-century. Its apparatus appends annual customs and excise ledgers (1689–1726), a consolidated national-debt table, comparative army and militia returns, and division lists.

The History devotes 1,078 folio pages to evaluating earlier historians—Clarendon, Burnet, Echard, Kennet, Rapin, Ludlow, L’Estrange, North and Oldmixon—and supplements them with letters, diaries, memoirs, biographies, journals, parliamentary reports, budget statements, state tracts, judicial reports, and the daily Gazettes of the period, including the printed Somers Tracts.

The book departs from traditional Augustan historical writing: it is anti-clerical, rejects providential explanation, brings a Harringtonian emphasis on social and economic forces associated with Bolingbroke, and undertakes a sustained critique of earlier Whig and Tory party histories. The work has also been classed, alongside Guthrie’s, as a specimen of the emerging Enlightenment school.

Drawing on these sources, the History engages critically with earlier general histories, especially Burnet’s History of His Own Time. It challenges Burnet’s anecdotalism and credulity, corrects specific errors (for example, the voting history of the 1690 Sacheverell Bill), and faults omissions such as the failure to discuss the bill to establish the Bank of England. It also highlights derivative practices among Burnet, Tindal, Kennett, Oldmixon and Boyer.

While retaining a Country perspective—treating “tyranny” as having increased after 1688, offering a markedly negative reading of the financial revolution, and depicting William’s war against France as wasteful—the narrative rejects partisan commonplaces such as the Popish Plot and the Rye House Plot canards and ridicules rumours about the birth of James Francis Edward Stuart. It offers a detailed explanation of how the authoritarianism of Charles II, together with the servility of Parliament and people, nearly enabled James II to succeed.

== Reception ==
Trade and press response appears to have been limited. Surviving indications point to few buyers and little contemporary notice in Britain or abroad. Overall the project proved commercially unsuccessful; one modern account characterises it, relative to Guthrie’s, as a “total” commercial failure.

Eighteenth-century views were mixed. The Monthly Review (1749) praised the author’s “laborious diligence” and the utility of the fiscal appendices; the Tory The Craftsman dismissed it as “Country-party spleen”; and The Gentleman's Magazine called the prefatory essays “an excrescence” but admitted the statistical digests were “serviceable to the curious statesman.” Around 1761, Tobias Smollett dubbed him “the circumstantial Ralph,” using the 18th-century sense of “circumstantial” to mean richly detailed—a nod to the work’s document-heavy style.

Too scholarly for popular perusal, it was, in Kenny’s words, “a historian’s history” that has been praised for two centuries. In the nineteenth century, Henry Hallam called Ralph “the most acute and diligent historian we possess for these times.” Charles James Fox found in it material “but slightly touched by other historians” and expressed surprise that Ralph’s reputation was not greater. In the twentieth century, Laird Okie described the book as the most subtle and detailed pre-Macaulay account of the Glorious Revolution, ahead of Burnet and Rapin.

== Legacy ==
Although the projected third volume covering the reign of George II was never completed, the History circulated on both sides of the Atlantic. Its constitutional principles later informed revolutionary American rhetoric, and the 1760 pamphlet A Letter to the People of Pennsylvania cites it on judicial tenure.

The work’s heavy use of fiscal and administrative data—annual customs and excise ledgers, consolidated national-debt tables, and army/militia returns—was a rare early systematic use of quantitative state evidence in English political historiography.

== Sources ==
- Bailyn, Bernard (1965). Pamphlets of the American Revolution, 1750–1776: Volume I, 1750–1765. Harvard University Press. p. 3.
- Hallam, Henry (1827). The Constitutional History of England: From the Accession of Henry VII to the Death of George II. John Murray.
- Kenny, Robert W. (1940). "James Ralph: An Eighteenth-Century Philadelphian in Grub Street". The Pennsylvania Magazine of History and Biography. 64 (2): 218–242. JSTOR 20087279.
- McKinsey, Elizabeth R. (1973). "James Ralph: The Professional Writer Comes of Age". Proceedings of the American Philosophical Society. 117 (1): 59–78. JSTOR 985948.
- Okie, Laird (1991). Augustan Historical Writing: Historiography in England, 1688–1750. Lanham, MD: University Press of America.
- Ralph, James (1744). The History of England, Vol. I. J. Rivington.
