= Thomas Carte =

English historian (1686–1754)

Thomas or John Carte (1686–1754) was an English historian with Jacobite sympathies, who served as a Church of England clergyman.

== Life ==
Carte was born in 1686 near Clifton upon Dunsmore (itself near Rugby), the eldest son of the antiquarian Samuel Carte. He matriculated at University College, Oxford in 1698, and took his degree from Brasenose College, Oxford, in 1702, and an MA from King's College, Cambridge, in 1706.

Carte first became known for the controversy that opposed him to Henry Chandler, father of Samuel Chandler, regarding the role played by King Charles I in the Irish Rebellion of 1641. This controversy started with a sermon Carte preached at the Abbey Church in Bath in 1714, where he was a reader. In this sermon Carte defended King Charles I against the accusation that he was in league with Phelim O'Neill who pretended to act on a (probably false) royal commission issued.

His attachment to the Stuarts also caused him to remain a non-juror. He was ordained around 1714, and in that year refused to take the Oath of Allegiance. On the discovery of the plot of Francis Atterbury, whose secretary he was, he was accused of high treason in 1722 and was forced to flee to France adopting the name of Philips.

There he collected materials for illustrating a London edition of the Historium sui temporis of Jacques Auguste de Thou planned by Samuel Buckley. These materials were purchased and published by Richard Mead. Carte was pardoned and recalled to England in 1728 through the influence of Queen Caroline. Carte held the rectory in Yattendon, Berkshire, during the later part of his life.

Richard Mead made it possible for Carte and Samuel Buckley to publish the London edition of de Thou's Latin History in 1733.

He started work on the Life of James Duke of Ormond. He obtained an important collection of letters from Charles Butler, 1st Earl of Arran. He published the letters in 1735 as volume 3 so that references could be made to them with correct page numbers. He then published volumes 1 and 2 in 1736.

He then started work on a "General History of England" as an improvement on Paul de Rapin's Histoire d'Angleterre. Carte published volume 1 in 1747, volume 2 in 1750 and volume 3 in 1752. Volume 4 was published in 1755 after his death. He lost the trust of many of his patrons by including an anecdote about a miraculous healing of King's Evil by royal touch, given by the "Old Pretender" in the first volume.

He died on 2 April 1754. He was buried in the church at Yattendon.

== Works ==
=== Life of James Duke of Ormond ===
==== Edition 1735/1736 ====
In three volumes: Volume three was published first and has a different title.

- Carte, Thomas (1736). An History of the Life of James Duke of Ormonde. Vol. 1. London: J.J. and P. Knapton. OCLC 59522918.
- Carte, Thomas (1736). An History of the Life of James Duke of Ormonde. Vol. 2. London: J.J. and P. Knapton. OCLC 59522918.
- Carte, Thomas (1735). A Collection of Letters, Written by the Kings Charles I. and II., the Duke of Ormonde, the Secretaries of State, the Marquess of Clanricarde, and Other Great Men during the Troubles of Great Britain and Ireland. Vol. 3. London: J.J. and P. Knapton. OCLC 59522918. – Letters

==== Edition 1851 ====
In six volumes

- Carte, Thomas (1851) [1st pub. 1736]. The Life of James Duke of Ormond. Vol. 1 (New ed.). Oxford: Oxford University Press. OCLC 1086656347. – 1613 to 1641
- Carte, Thomas (1851) [1st pub. 1736]. The Life of James Duke of Ormond. Vol. 2 (New ed.). Oxford: Oxford University Press. OCLC 1086656347. – 1641 to 1643
- Carte, Thomas (1851) [1st pub. 1736]. The Life of James Duke of Ormond. Vol. 3 (New ed.). Oxford: Oxford University Press. OCLC 1086656347. – 1643 to 1660
- Carte, Thomas (1851) [1st pub. 1736]. The Life of James Duke of Ormond. Vol. 4 (New ed.). Oxford: Oxford University Press. OCLC 1086656347. – 1660 to 1688
- Carte, Thomas (1851) [1st pub. 1735]. The Life of James Duke of Ormond. Vol. 5 (New ed.). Oxford: Oxford University Press. OCLC 1086656347. – Letters 1
- Carte, Thomas (1851) [1st pub. 1735]. The Life of James Duke of Ormond. Vol. 6 (New ed.). Oxford: Oxford University Press. OCLC 1086656347. – Letters 2

=== A General History of England ===
- Carte, Thomas (1747). A General History of England. Vol. 1. London: J. Hodges. OCLC 847250492. – Earliest times to 1216
- Carte, Thomas (1750). A General History of England. Vol. 2. London: Printed for the Author. – 1216 to 1509
- Carte, Thomas (1752). A General History of England. Vol. 3. London: Printed for the Author. OCLC 487193369. – 1509 to 1613

Carte's series appeared amid a crowded decade of large-scale histories, including Nicholas Tindal’s continuation of Rapin and paired Country-Whig projects by William Guthrie and James Ralph: Guthrie's General History of England (1744–51), carrying the narrative to 1688, and Ralph's The History of England, During the Reigns of King William, Queen Anne, and King George I (1744–46), treating the post-Revolution period.

=== Other works ===
- A General Account of the Necessary Materials for a History of England (1738)
- History of the Revolutions of Portugal, with letters of Sir Robert Southwell during his embassy there (London, 1740)

He collected a large quantity of historical papers during his life. They became the property of the University of Oxford, and were deposited in the Bodleian Library, where they are known as the Carte Manuscripts.
