= Abel Boyer =

French-English lexicographer

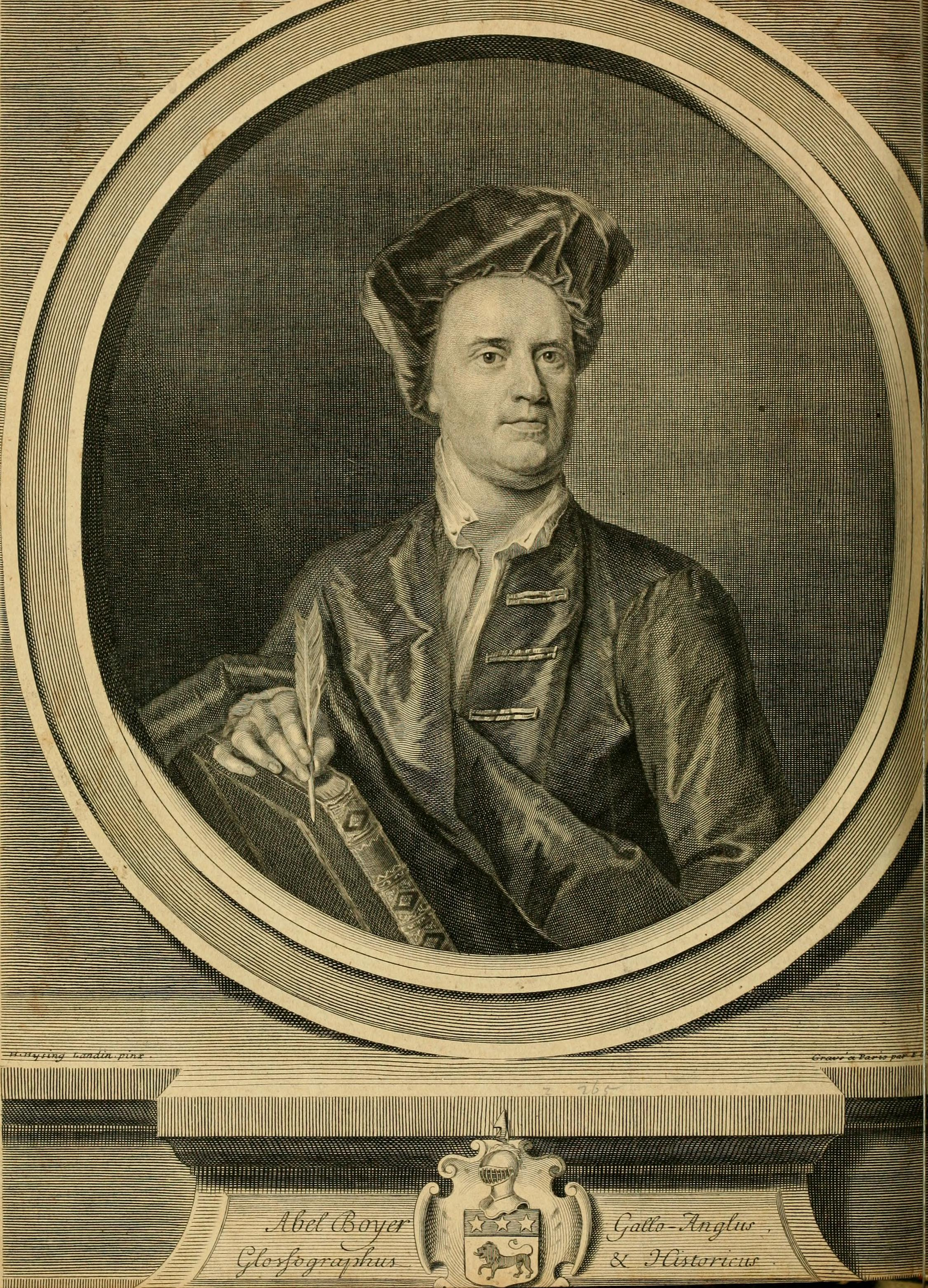
- Born: 1667; Castres, in Upper Languedoc, southern France
- Died: November 16, 1729 (aged 61–62)
- Occupations: French-English lexicographer, journalist and miscellaneous writer

Abel Boyer (1667? – 16 November 1729) was a French-English lexicographer, journalist and miscellaneous writer.

== Biography ==
Abel Boyer was probably born on 24 June 1667 at Castres, in Upper Languedoc, southern France. His father, Pierre Boyer, one of the two consuls or chief magistrates of Castres, had been suspended and fined for his Protestantism. Boyer's education at the academy of Puylaurens was interrupted by the religious disturbances, and leaving France with his maternal uncle Pierre Campdomerc, a noted Huguenot preacher, he finished his studies at Franeker in Friesland, after a brief episode, it is said, of military service in Holland. Proceeding to England in 1689 he fell into great poverty, and is represented as transcribing and preparing for the press Dr. Thomas Smith's edition of William Camden's Latin correspondence (London, 1691). A good classical scholar, Boyer became in 1692 tutor to Allen Bathurst, afterwards first Earl Bathurst, whose father Sir Benjamin was treasurer of the household of the princess, afterwards Queen Anne. Probably through this connection he was appointed French teacher to her son Prince William, Duke of Gloucester, for whose use he prepared and to whom he dedicated The Complete French Master, published in 1694. Disappointed of advancement on account of his zeal for Whig principles, he abandoned tuition for authorship.

In December 1699, Boyer produced on the London stage, with indifferent success, a modified translation in blank verse of Jean Racine's Iphigénie, which was published in 1700 as Achilles or Iphigenia in Aulis, a tragedy written by Mr. Boyer. A second edition of it appeared in 1714 as The Victim, or Achilles and Iphigenia in Aulis, in an "advertisement" prefixed to which Boyer stated that in its first form it had "passed the correction and approbation" of John Dryden.

In 1699 also the work for which Boyer is best known was published, The Royal Dictionary, "In two parts. First, French and English. Secondly, English and French", ostensibly composed for the use of the Duke of Gloucester, then dead. In 1700 Boyer produced an abridged version, and in 1702 a version titled in French was published in The Hague. It was much superior to every previous work of the kind, and has been the basis of very many subsequent French-English dictionaries; the last English unabridged edition is that of 1816; the edition published at Paris in 1860 is stated to be the 41st. For the English-French section Boyer claimed the merit of containing a more complete English dictionary than any previous one, the English words and idioms in it being defined and explained as well as accompanied by their French equivalents. In the French preface to the whole work, Boyer said that 1,000 English words not in any other English dictionary had been added to his by Richard Savage, whom he spoke of as his friend, and who assisted him in several of his French manuals and miscellaneous compilations and translations published subsequently. The macrostructure and microstructure of the entries in Boyer's Royal Dictionary was copied by Ó Beaglaoich in his English-Irish Dictionary of 1732. Among the English versions of French works executed in whole or in part by Boyer was a popular translation of Fénelon's Télémaque, of which a twelfth edition appeared in 1728.

In 1702, Boyer published a History of William III, which included one of James II, and in 1703 he began to issue The History of the Reign of Queen Anne digested into annals, a yearly register of political and miscellaneous occurrences, containing several plans and maps illustrating the military operations of the War of the Spanish Succession. Before the last volume, the eleventh, of this work appeared in 1713, he had started publishing a similar monthly periodical, The Political State of Great Britain, being an impartial account of the most material occurrences, ecclesiastical, civil, and military, in a monthly letter to a friend in Holland (38 volumes, 1711–29). Its contents, which were those of a monthly newspaper, included abstracts of the chief political pamphlets published on both sides, and, like the Annals, is, both from its form and matter, very useful for reference. The Political State is, moreover, particularly noticeable as being the first periodical, issued at brief intervals, which contained a parliamentary chronicle, and in which parliamentary debates were reported with comparative regularity and with some approximation to accuracy. In the case of the House of Lords' reports various devices, such as giving only the initials of the names of the speakers, were resorted to escape punishment, but in the case of the House of Commons the entire names were frequently given. According to Boyer's own account (preface to his folio History of Queen Anne, and to vol. xxxvii. of the Political State) he had been furnished by members of both houses of parliament (among whom he mentioned Lord Stanhope) with reports of their speeches, and he had even succeeded in becoming an occasional 'ear-witness' of the debates themselves. When he was threatened at the beginning of 1729 with arrest by the printers of the votes, whose monopoly they accused him of infringing, he asserted that for thirty years in his History of King William, his Annals, and in his Political State, he had given reports of parliamentary debates without being molested. The threat induced him to discontinue the publication of the debates. He intended to resume the work, but failed to carry out his intention. He died in a house which he had built for himself at Chelsea, London.

Besides conducting the periodicals mentioned, Boyer began in 1705 to edit the Post-boy, a thrice-a-week London news-sheet. His connection with it ended in August 1709, through a quarrel with the proprietor, when Boyer started on his own account a True Post-boy, which seems to have been short-lived. A Case which he printed in vindication of his right to use the name of Post-boy for his new venture gives some curious particulars of the way in which the news-sheets of the time were manufactured. Boyer was also the author of pamphlets, in one of which, An Account of the State and Progress of the present Negotiations of Peace, he attacked Jonathan Swift, who writes in the Journal to Stella (16 October 1711), after dining with Bolingbroke:

One Boyer, a French dog, has abused me in a pamphlet, and I have got him up in a messenger's hands. The secretary [St. John] promises me to swinge him. ... I must make that rogue an example for warning to others.

Boyer was discharged from custody through the intervention, he says, of Robert Harley, to whom he boasts of having rendered services. Though he professed a strict political impartiality in the conduct of his principal periodicals, Boyer was a zealous whig. For this reason doubtless Alexander Pope gave him a niche in The Dunciad (book ii. 413), where, under the soporific influence of Dulness, "Boyer the state, and Law the stage gave o'er" his crime, according to Pope's explanatory note, being that he was "a voluminous compiler of annals, political collections, &c."

== Works ==
Boyer was a prolific author: the British Library's 1880 catalogue used nearly four folio pages of print to list his works.

- The compleat French master for ladies and gentlemen: being a new method, to learn with ease and delight the French tongue, 1694
- Character of the Virtues and Vices of the Age, 1695
- A Geographical and Historical Description of those Parts of Europe which are the Seat of War, 1696
- Royal Dictionary, 1699
- Achilles, or, Iphigenia in Aulis a tragedy as it is acted at the Theatre Royal in Drury-lane , 1700
- The Wise and Ingenious Companion, French and English, 1700
- The Draughts of the most Remarkable Fortified Towns of Europe, 1701
- English Theophrastus, or, Manners of the Age: Being the Modern Characters of the Court, the Town, and the City, 1702
- The History of King William the Third, 3 vols, 1702-3
- Theory and Practice of Architecture, 1703
- The History of the Reign of Queen Anne Digested into Annals, 1703–13
- An Account of the State and Progress of the Present Negotiation of Peace, 1711
- Les soupirs de l'Europe etc., or, The groans of Europe at the prospect of the present posture of affairs, 1713, tr. from Jean Dumont
- A Philological Essay, or, Reflections on the Death of Free-Thinkers, 1713, tr. from André-François Deslandes
- Memoirs of the Life and Negotiations of Sir William Temple, 1714
- Compleat and Impartial History of the Impeachments of the Last Ministry, 1716
- The Interest of Great Britain, 1716
- (Anon.) Animadversions and Observations, 1718
- History of Queen Anne, 1722, second edition 1735, with maps and plans illustrating Marlborough's campaigns, and "a regular series of all the medals that were struck to commemorate the great events of this reign"
- (Anon.) Memoirs of the Life and Negotiations of Sir William Temple, Bart., containing the most important occurrences and the most secret springs of affairs in Christendom from the year 1655 to the year 1681; with an account of Sir W. Temple's writings, 1714, second edition 1715
- The Political state of Great Britain. 1725.
- (with J. Innes) Le Grand Theatre de l'Honneur, French and English, 1729, containing a dictionary of heraldic terms and a treatise on heraldry, with engravings of the arms of the sovereign princes and states of Europe. Published by subscription and dedicated to Frederick, Prince of Wales.

== Reception ==
Boyer’s historical compilations were revisited by later historians. In 1744–46, James Ralph’s The History of England, During the Reigns of King William, Queen Anne, and King George I criticised the derivative nature of some of Boyer’s work, grouping him with Burnet, Tindal, Kennett, and Oldmixon.

== Bibliography ==
=== References ===
- Gibbs, Graham (2008) [2004]. "Boyer, Abel (1667?–1729)". Oxford Dictionary of National Biography (online ed.). Oxford University Press. doi:10.1093/ref:odnb/3122. (Subscription, Wikipedia Library access or UK public library membership required.)
1. Vol. 7: "Box–Browell" (61 Vols.). p. 85. ISBN 0-1986-1357-1, 978-0-1986-1357-2 (this volume; 2004 ed.).
- Hager, Alan, ed. (2005). Encyclopedia of British Writers: 18th Century (2 Vols.). Gregory M. Colón Semenza (advisor); John Huntington (advisor). Facts on File, Inc. LCCN 2004-47070; ISBN 0-8160-5132-1 (2 Vol. set).
1. Vol. 2: "Boyer, Abel (1667–1929)". p. 34. ISBN 0-8160-5496-7 (Vol. 2).
- Mac Coinnigh, Marcas, PhD (28 July 2012). "Tracing Inspiration in Proverbial Material: From the Royal Dictionary (1699 & 1729) of Abel Boyer to the English-Irish Dictionary (1732) of Begley- McCurtin". International Journal of Lexicography. 26 (1). Oxford University Press: 23–57 – via Academia.edu. ISSN 0950-3846 (journal); doi:10.1093/ijl/ecs012 (article); OCLC 829966622 (article).
- Political State of Great Britain (The) (Monthly. 1st issue: January 1711). Abel Boyer (1667–1729), editor from 1711 to 1729, a French Huguenot who moved to England in 1689. London: Printed and sold by various people and firms, but notably J. Baker at the Globe in Pater-Noster-Row. 1711–1740. Retrieved February 26, 2025. LCCN 05-9785; OCLC 83347326 (all editions); OCLC 1399240989 (all editions), OCLC 1044295804 (all editions).
1. * Vol. 38 (December 1729). "Deaths, Births, and Marriages of Eminent Persons". "An Account of Mr. Boyer's Life and Writings". pp. 604–606 – via Google Books (KB).

=== Attribution ===
This article incorporates text from a publication now in the public domain: Francis Espinasse, Francis (1886). "Boyer, Abel". In Stephen, Leslie (ed.). Dictionary of National Biography. Vol. 6. London: Smith, Elder & Co.
