= Laurence Echard =

English historian and clergyman, c. 1670–1730

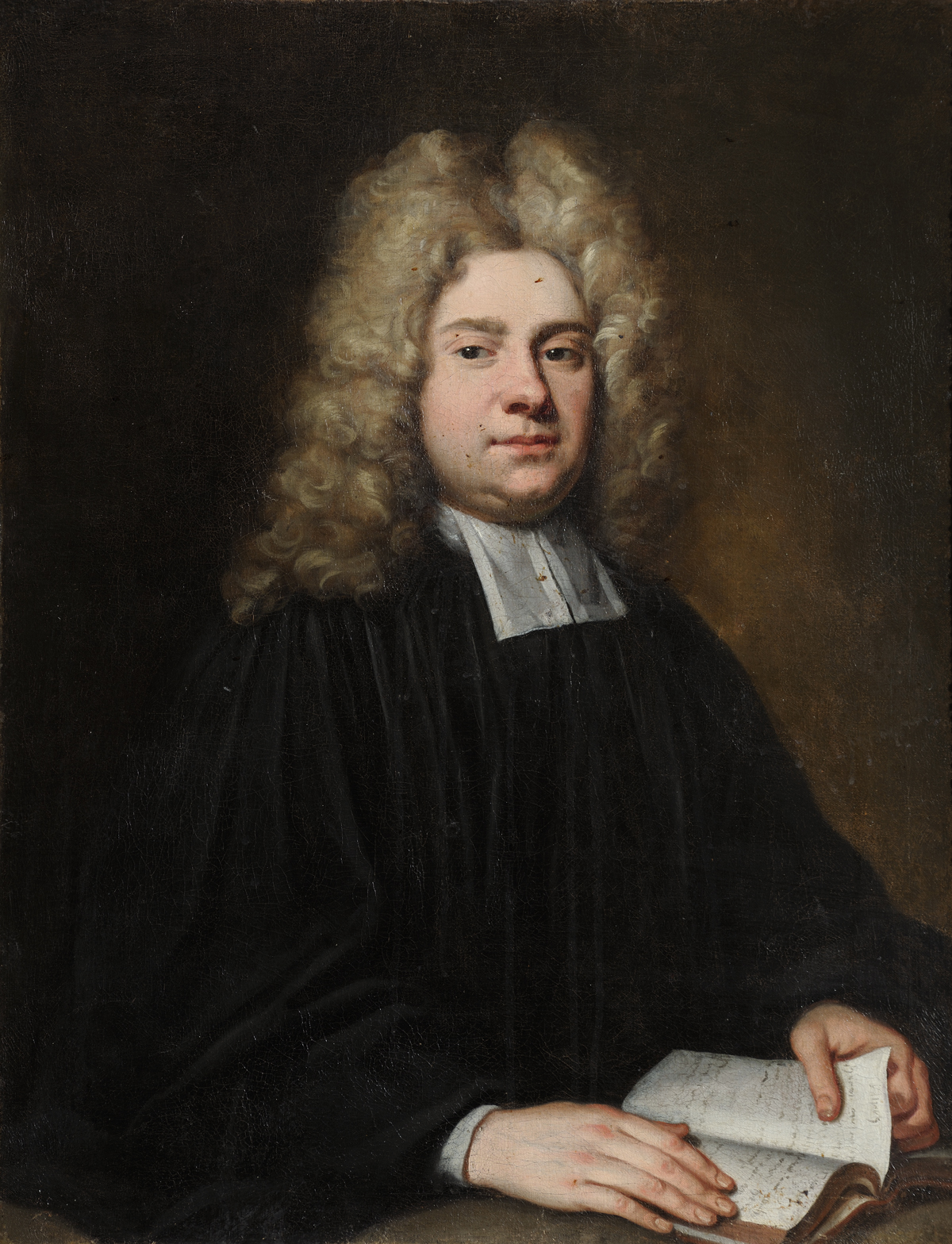
A painting of Laurence Echard by Godfrey Kneller

Laurence Echard (c. 1670–1730) was an English historian and clergyman. He wrote a History of England that was a standard work in its time.

== Life ==
Echard was the son of the Rev. Thomas Echard or Eachard of Barsham, Suffolk, by his wife, the daughter of Samuel and Dorothy Groome, and was born at Barsham. On 26 May 1687, at the age of 17, he was admitted as a sizar of Christ's College, Cambridge, where he graduated B.A. in 1692 and M.A. in 1695. Having been ordained by John Moore, bishop of Norwich, he was presented to the livings of Welton and Elkington, Lincolnshire, and appointed chaplain to the Bishop of Lincoln.

For more than 20 years Echard remained in Lincolnshire, chiefly at Louth, and wrote several works. On 24 April 1697 he was installed as prebendary of Louth at Lincoln Cathedral, and on 12 August 1712 as Archdeacon of Stow. In or about 1722 Echard was presented by George I with the livings of Rendlesham and Sudbourne in Suffolk. There he lived in bad health for nearly eight years. He died at Lincoln, while on his way to Scarborough for the benefit of the waters, on 16 August 1730, and was buried in the chancel of St Mary Magdalen's Church on the 29th of that month.

== Works ==
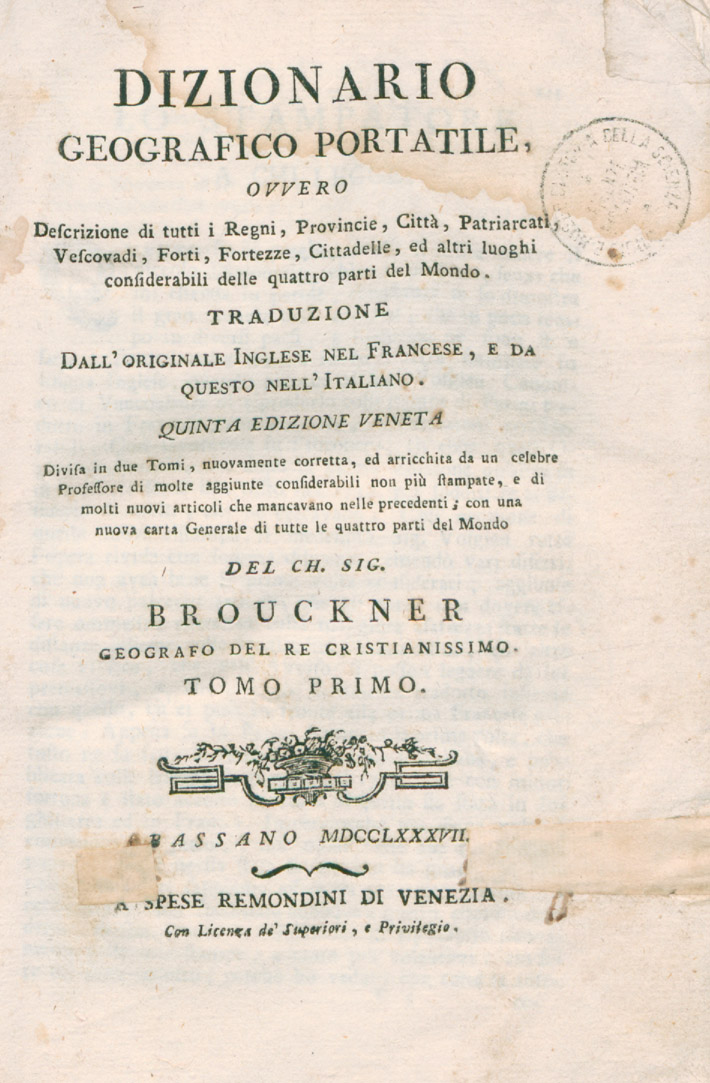
Dizionario geografico portatile, 1787 (in Italian)

Echard translated Terence, some Plautus, and Pierre-Joseph d'Orléans' History of the Revolutions in England. He made numerous compilations on history, geography and the classics. His chief work is The History of England: from the first entrance of Julius Caesar and the Romans to the end of the reign of King James the First containing the space of 1678 years (several editions published by Jacob Tonson between 1707 and 1720), covering the period from the Roman occupation to his own times. This continued to be the standard work on the subject until Nicolas Tindal's translations and expansions of Rapin de Thoyras's French Histoire d'Angleterre ("History of England") began to appear in English in 1727. Echard also wrote a history of the Roman republic from its founding to the Augustan settlement.

Echard also compiled The Gazetteer's, or Newsman's Interpreter (1st edition, 1692), a geographical index the name of which is thought to have given rise to the use of the word gazetteer to mean "a dictionary or index of geographical locations". In the preface, Echard said "The Title was given me by a very eminent Person, whom I forbear to name", and that the work was "partly design'd for all such as frequent Coffee-Houses, and other places for News", that is, to help readers better understand the newspapers written by "gazetteers", an archaic term for journalists.

== Family ==
Echard married first Jane, daughter of the Rev. Potter of Yorkshire, and secondly Justin, daughter of Robert Wooley of Well, Lincolnshire. There were no children by either marriage.
