= Thomas Birch =

English historian (1705–1766)

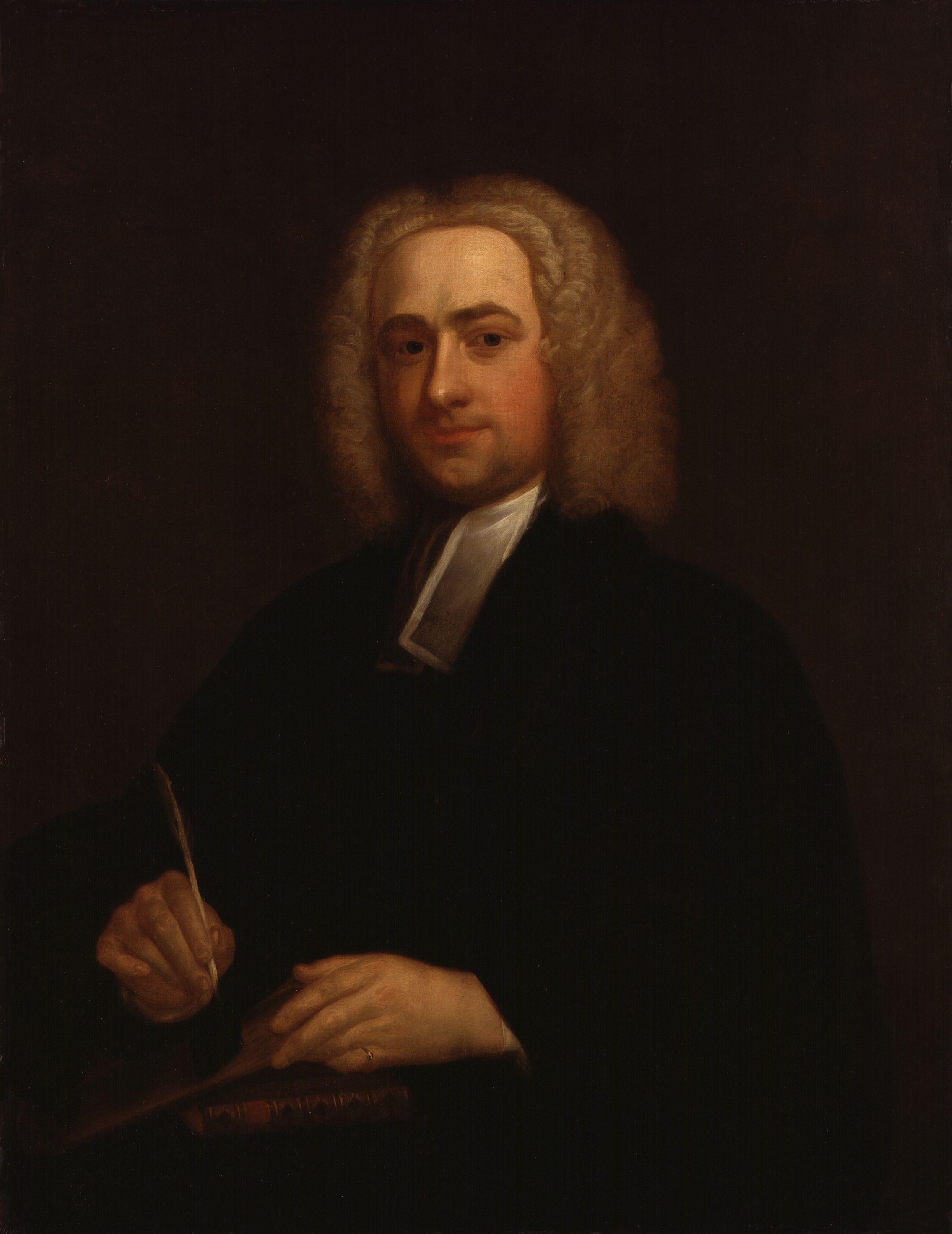
- Born: 23 November 1705
- Died: 9 January 1766 (aged 60)
- Occupations: Historian and Keeper of books at British Museum.
- Known for: Fellow of the Royal Society

Thomas Birch (23 November 1705 – 9 January 1766) was an English antiquarian, historian, and writer.

== Life ==
Birch was the son of Joseph Birch, a maker of coffee mills, and was born in Clerkenwell, London.

Birch preferred study to business but, as his parents were Quakers, did not go to the university. Notwithstanding this circumstance, he was ordained deacon in the Church of England in 1730 and priest in 1731. As a strong supporter of the Whigs, he gained the favour of Philip Yorke, later Lord Chancellor and first Earl of Hardwicke, and his subsequent preferments were largely due to this friendship. He held successively a number of benefices in different counties, and finally in London.

Birch was noted as a keen fisherman during the course of his lifetime, and devised an unusual method of disguising his intentions from fish. He would stand dressed as a tree by the side of a stream in an outfit designed to make his arms seem like branches and the rod and line seem like a spray of blossom. He argued that any movement would be taken by a fish to be the consequences of a mild breeze.

In 1735, Birch became a member of the Society of Antiquaries and was elected a fellow of the Royal Society, for the latter of which he was secretary from 1752 to 1765. In 1728, he married Hannah Cox, who died in the following year. He was killed on 9 January 1766 by a fall from his horse and was buried in the church of St Margaret Pattens, London, of which he was then rector. He died, according to his will, "in a full confidence in the Mercy and Goodness of almighty God and with a firm persuasion of a blessed Immortality discoverable by the Light of Nature and confirmed for us Christians by that of Revelation", leaving his books and manuscripts to the British Museum, and a sum of about £500 to increase the salaries of the three assistant librarians.

== Writings ==
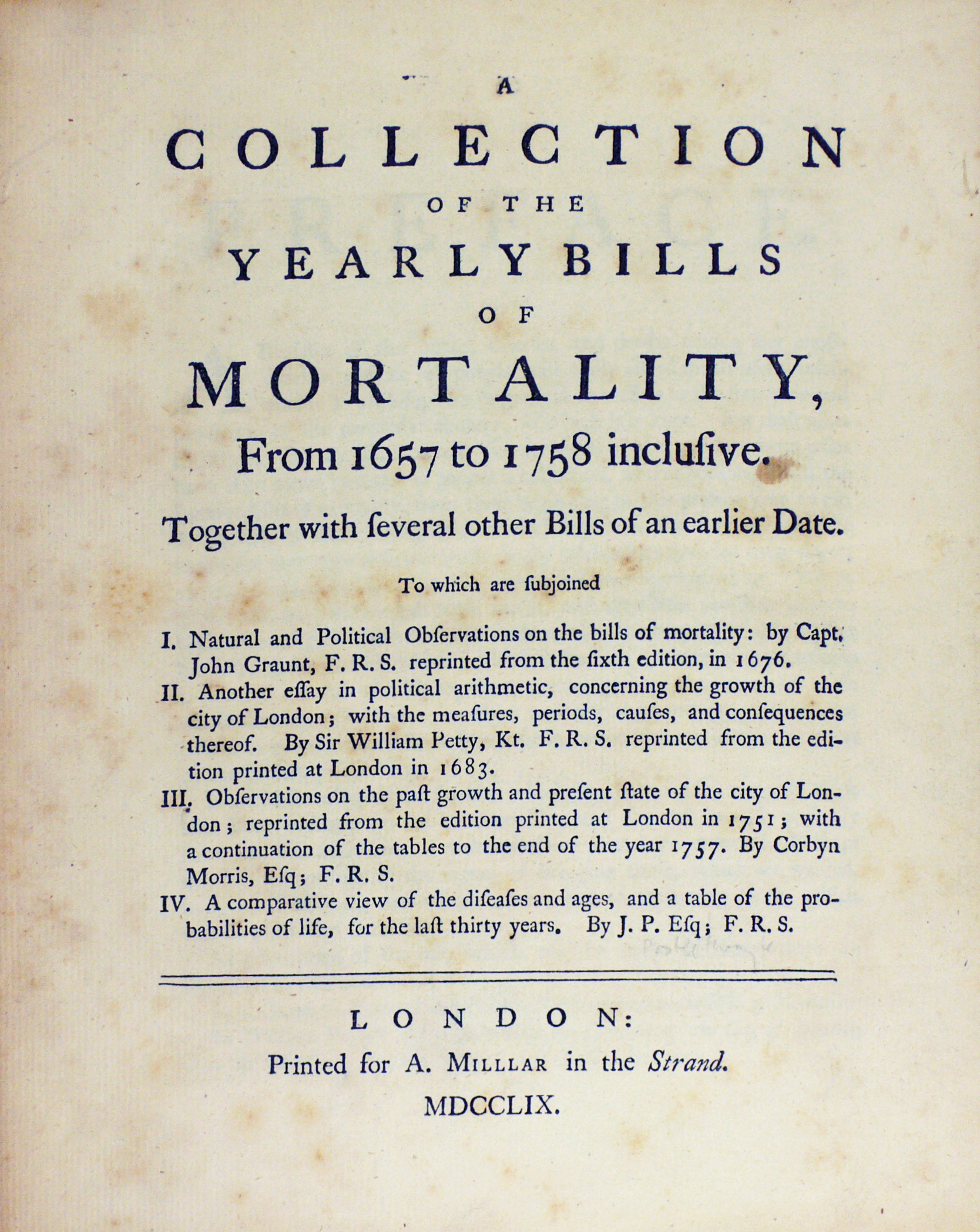
Yearly bills of mortality, 1759 (Milano, Fondazione Mansutti)

Birch corresponded with prominent men of his time and was prolific, though contemporaries like Horace Walpole questioned his "parts, taste and judgment." Samuel Johnson wrote: "Tom Birch is as brisk as a bee in conversation; but no sooner does he take a pen in his hand, than it becomes a torpedo to him, and benumbs all his faculties". James Boswell, however, argued "that the literature of this country is much indebted to Birch’s activity and diligence must certainly be acknowledged. We have seen that Johnson honoured him with a Greek Epigram; and his correspondence with him, during many years, proves that he had no mean opinion of him."

Birch often collaborated with successful London bookseller Andrew Millar, who helped publish some of Birch's most highly profitable publications. These included The Works of the Honourable Robert Boyle, co-written by Reverend Henry Miles (in 5 volumes folio, 1744), and A Complete Collection of the Historical, Political, and Miscellaneous Works of John Milton (in 2 volumes folio, 1738, followed in 2 volumes quarto, 1753).

Birch wrote most of the English lives in the General Dictionary, Historical and Critical, 10 vols. (London, 1734–1741), assisted in the composition of the Athenian Letters (London, 1741–43), and edited the State Papers of John Thurloe (London, 1742) and the State Papers of W. Murdin (London, 1759). He also wrote:

In the 1740s, Birch worked within the Hardwicke circle on Nicholas Tindal’s continuation of Rapin; correspondence indicates he was effectively the main author of the Continuation (1744–47). The project coincided with opposition Country-Whig histories by William Guthrie and James Ralph—Guthrie’s General History of England (1744–51) to 1688, and Ralph’s post-Revolution sequel, The History of England, During the Reigns of King William, Queen Anne, and King George I (1744–46).

- Inquiry into the share which King Charles I had in the transactions of the Earl of Glamorgan for bringing over a body of Irish rebels (published by Millar in London, 1756);
- Historical view of Negotiations between the Courts of England, France and Brussels 1592-1617 (London, 1749);
- Life of Archbishop Tillotson (London, 1753);
- History of the Royal Society of London (London, 1756–1757);
- Life of Henry, Prince of Wales (London, 1760), and other works.
- The heads of illustrious persons of Great Britain, in 108 copper plates, engraved by Mr. Houbraken and Mr. Vertue, with their lives and characters, by Thomas Birch, D.D. Secretary of the Royal Society, London, 1761

Among the papers left at his death were some which were published in 1848 as the Court and Times of James I and the Court and Times of Charles I.

=== Copies of Franklin letters ===
American researcher Alan Houston discovered in 2007 at the British Library a file entitled Copies of [Benjamin Franklin's] Letters relating to the March of General Braddock. Birch was said to have obsessively copied any documents of historical importance he could get his hands on. He was a friend of Franklin, and they were both members of the Royal Society. In his autobiography, Franklin refers to his "Quire Book", which had never been found but would have contained letters and papers concerning his efforts to support the British Government at that pre-revolutionary time. They speak of his 1755 efforts to help British Redcoats led by General Edward Braddock in their march to defeat the French at Fort Duquesne in today's Pittsburgh. Braddock desperately needed transportation for his troops, and Franklin rounded up horses and wagons for him using his persuasive powers as Pennsylvania's leading politician. Braddock and most of his men, who included George Washington, were defeated by the French and their Indian allies.

== Works ==
- Birch, Thomas (1754). Memoirs of the Reign of Queen Elizabeth from the Year 1581 till her Death. In which the secret intrigues of her Court, And the conduct of her favourite, Robert Earl of Essex, both at Home and Aboard are particularly illustrated. Vol. I.
- Birch, Thomas (1754). Memoirs of the Reign of Queen Elizabeth from the Year 1581 till her Death. In which the secret intrigues of her Court, And the conduct of her favourite, Robert Earl of Essex, both at Home and Aboard are particularly illustrated. Vol. II. at Google Books.
