= André-François Deslandes =

French philosopher

André-François Boureau-Deslandes (21 May 1689 – 11 April 1757) was a French philosopher.

Deslandes has been viewed as an important precursor of the Encyclopédistes. He was appointed Commissioner of the Port of Brest in the Province of Brittany in 1716. He was a corresponding member from La Rochelle of the Académie des Inscriptions et Belles-Lettres, and a member of the Prussian Academy of Sciences.

== Family background ==
Deslandes was born into an important family in Pondichéry. He was the son of André Boureau-Deslandes (born in Tours) and grandson of François Martin (1634–1706), the founder and first governor of Pondichéry.

His father André Boureau-Deslandes played a major role in the diplomatic relations between France and Siam, then in India where he became Director General of Commerce in Bengal. On his return to France, he was sent to Saint-Domingue as an officer in the Navy of the kings of France and Spain, and inspector-general of "l'Assiente". He was ennobled by letters in 1703 and died at Léogâne in 1707. In 1686 he married Deslandes' mother, Marie-Françoise, the daughter of the famous knight Martin, the governor of Pondichéry. They had eight children of which six survived, including two who became clergymen. Deslandes' father brought François Martin's Memoirs back to France as books of manuscripts, and they were later published in three volumes.

== Works ==
- L'apotheose du beau-sexe, 1712
- Reflexions sur les grands hommes qui sont morts en plaisantant , 1712. English translation by Abel Boyer, 1713
- Histoire critique de la philosophie, 1737.
- Pigmalion ou la statue animée, 1741
- Essay sur la marine et sur le commerce, 1743
- Lettre sur le luxe , 1745
