= William Tindal =

William Tindal (14 May 1756 – 16 September 1804) was an English Anglican priest and antiquary, writer of The History and Antiquities of the Abbey and Borough of Evesham.

== Life ==
Tindal was born in Chelmsford on 14 May 1756; he was a son of James Tindal (died 1760), captain in the 4th Regiment of Dragoons, youngest son of Nicholas Tindal. James married Miss Shenton, who, after his death, was married to Dr Smith, a physician at Cheltenham and Oxford.

At four years of age William and his mother went to reside with her brother, a minor canon of Chichester, and six years later they moved to Richmond. In 1772 he matriculated from Trinity College, Oxford, and was elected a scholar in the same year. He graduated B.A. in 1776 and M.A. in 1778, in which year he was ordained deacon and obtained a fellowship, which he held until his marriage. After serving as curate at Evesham, he became rector of Billingford in Norfolk in 1789, and in July 1792 he was also instituted to the rectory of Kington, Worcestershire. In 1799 he exchanged the rectory of Billingford for the chaplainship of the Tower of London. In the same year he was elected a fellow of the Society of Antiquaries.

Tindal committed suicide at the Tower on 16 September 1804, while in a state of mental depression. He married before 1794, and his wife survived him.

== Works ==
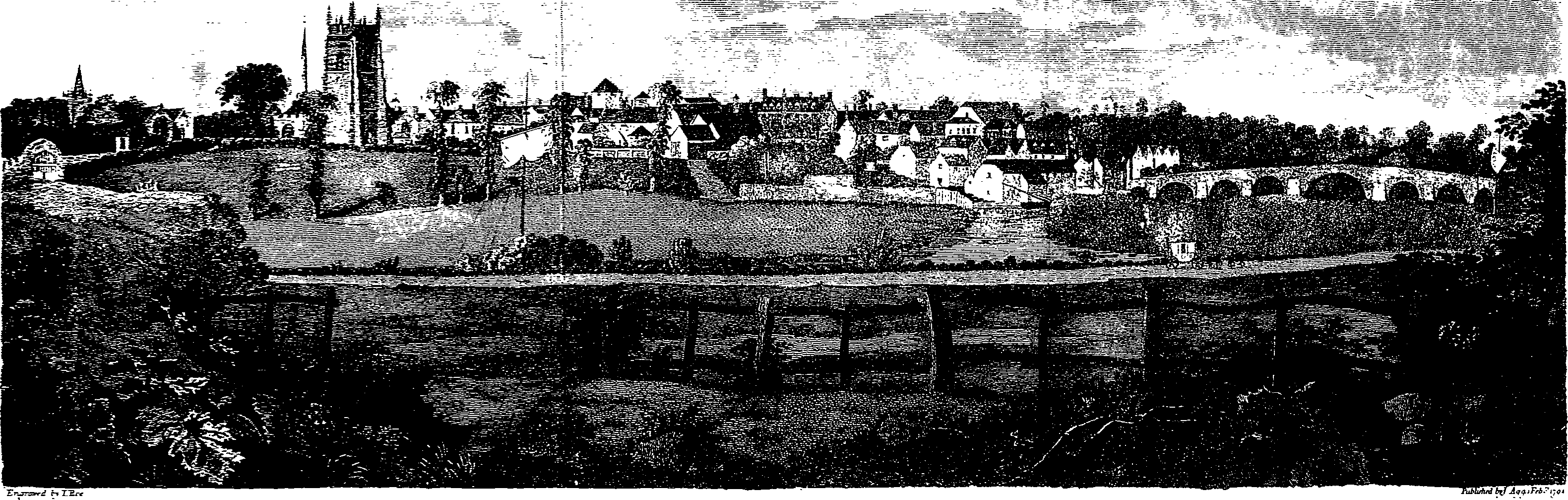
Fleuron from The History and Antiquities of the Abbey and Borough of Evesham

Besides writing several political pamphlets, he was the author of:

1. Remarks on Dr. Johnson's Life and Critical Observations on the Works of Gray (1782);
2. Juvenile Excursions in Literature and Criticism (London, 1791);
3. The History and Antiquities of the Abbey and Borough of Evesham (Evesham, 1794): this work won high praise from Horace Walpole.

Tindal is also said to have written a poetical essay in blank verse, entitled "The Evils and Advantages of Genius contrasted".
