= Samuel Carte =

English antiquarian and clergyman

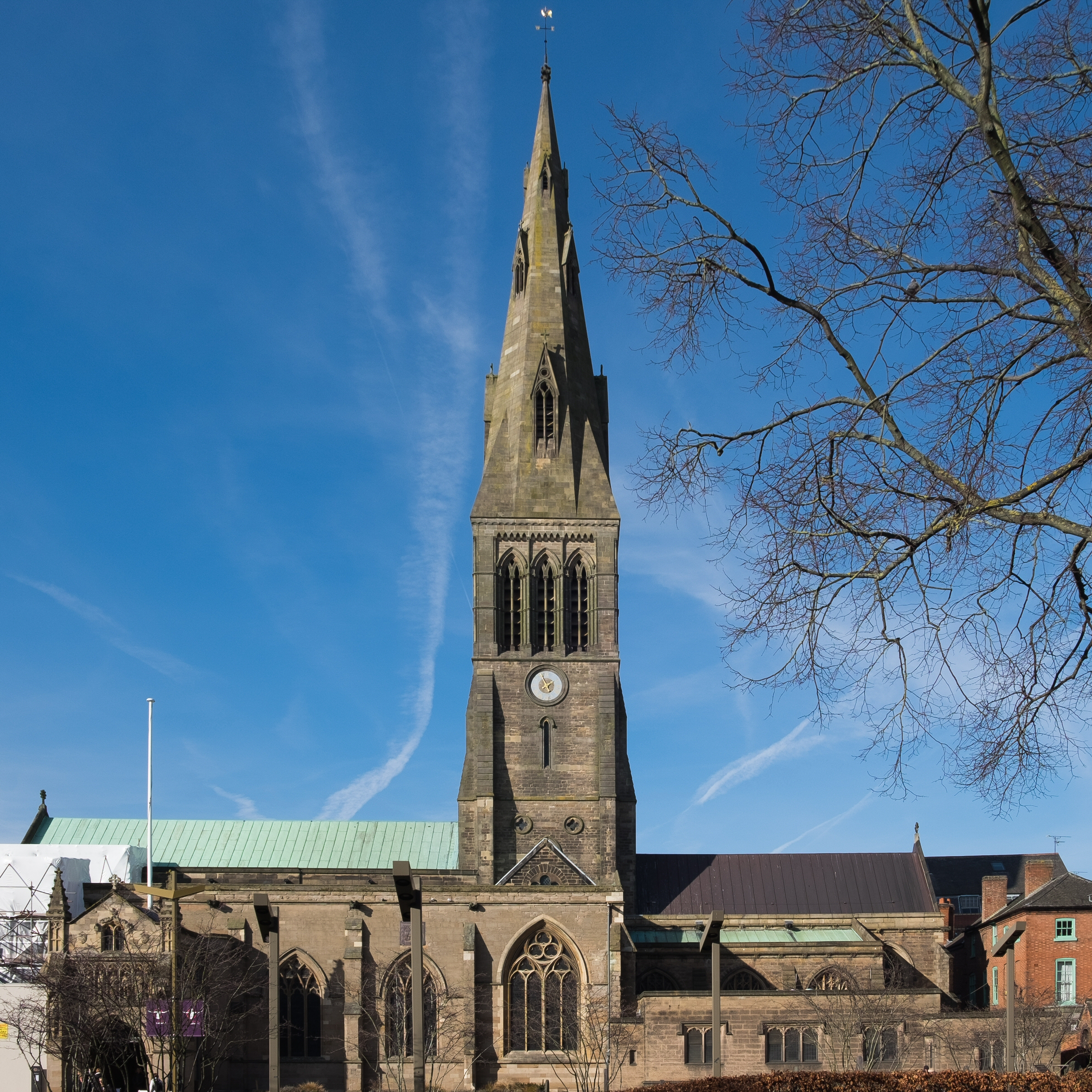
Leicester Cathedral, where Samuel Carte was active as a clergyman and theologian, and was later buried.

Samuel Carte (21 October 1652 – 16 April 1740) was an English antiquarian and clergyman of the Church of England. After attending Magdalen College, Oxford, he held many ecclesiastical positions in his adult life, publishing two sermons. He was an active local antiquarian researcher, assisting several fellow antiquarians in their histories of Leicestershire, and publishing several articles and one book on such subjects.

== Biography ==
Samuel Carte was born on 21 October 1652 in Coventry, Warwickshire, to the local clothier, Thomas Carte. Here, he was educated at the local free school, after which he matriculated from Magdalen College, Oxford University on 10 June 1669, at the age of 17. He graduated with a BA in 1673 and MA in 1675. He received deacon's orders from the Bishop of Lichfield and Coventry, Thomas Wood, at Eccleshall on 21 September 1673. Following by being ordained a priest by the Bishop of London, Henry Compton, on 10 June 1677.

Carte's first ecclesiastical position was as a curate of Crick, Northamptonshire, appointed on 26 March 1678. On 29 September 1682, he was made a prebendary of Lichfield Cathedral, a position he held until shortly before his death. From 26 March 1684 to 2 February 1693, Carte was the vicar of Clifton-upon-Dunsmore, Warwickshire. In 1691, Carte returned to Coventry, where he served as the master of the local free school. He returned to his career as a clergyman, working as vicar of Dunchurch from 2 July 1697 to 8 June 1699. On 7 January 1699, he was appointed both as the Preacher throughout the diocese of Lincoln, and the rector of Eastwell, Leicestershire, the latter position he held up until his death. In 1700, he was made lecturer and sequestrator at Leicester Cathedral, where, on 21 October 1712, he was made vicar, holding the office until the year of his death.

Independent of these offices, Carte engaged in much theological and antiquarian work. As a clergyman, two of his sermons were published: A Dissuasive from Murmuring: Being a Sermon on 1 Cor. X. 10. (1694) and The Cure of Self-Conceit: A Sermon Preach'd at St. Martin's in Leicester on Sunday, May 13. 1705 (1705). In the 1720s, he also engaged in a lengthy argument with John Jackson, a controversial unitarian cleric of Leicester Cathedral, concerning the validity of baptism by immersion and the Trinity. Contemporary antiquaries, including Browne Willis (for his 1718–19 Mitred Abbots) and John Throsby (for his 1791 History and Antiquities of Leicester), consulted Carte over the history of Leicestershire. After Carte's death, John Nichols used his work extensively for his History of Leicestershire (1795–1811). Carte's most important publication was antiquarian in nature: Tabula Chronologica Archiepiscopatuum et Episcopatuum in Anglia et Wallia [Chronological table of Archbishoprics and Bishoprics in England and Wales] (1714), a compilation of lists on the descent of the offices of archbishops and bishops. Carte also had a letter to Humfrey Wanley published in the Philosophical Transactions of the Royal Society.

Carte married Anne, together having thirteen children between 1686 and 1704, with Anne predeceasing Carte at a young age. Carte died in Leicester on 16 April 1740, and was buried at Leicester Cathedral next to his wife and two of his children. His will, written on 19 January 1736, put most of his possessions in the hands of his eldest son, Thomas Carte. Thomas left a large number of historical papers to the Bodleian Library upon his death, including several papers by his father, Samuel, such as his commonplace book and a "Chronological Account of Extraordinary Events in all Parts of the World". His grave reads:

The remains of
Samuel Carte, M.A. many years
Vicar of this parish. He was a person
of great learning, exemplary life
and conversation, strict piety,
sound judgment, orthodox principles,
and a zealous able defender of the
doctrine of the Holy Trinity
He died April 16th, 1740,
in the 87th year of his age, in full
assurance of a joyful resurrection.
Near this place lie interred
Ann wife and Elizabeth daughter

of the said Samuel Carte.

== Sources ==
- "Carte, Samuel (1673–1740)". Clergy of the Church of England database (CCEd).
- Nichols, John (1812). Literary Anecdotes of the Eighteenth Century, Vol. 2. London, England: Nichols, Son & Bentley.
- Sherlock, Peter (2010). "Carte, Samuel". Oxford Dictionary of National Biography (online ed.). Oxford University Press. doi:10.1093/ref:odnb/4779. (Subscription or UK public library membership required.)
- Shuckburgh, Evelyn Shirley (1887). "Carte, Samuel" . In Stephen, Leslie (ed.). Dictionary of National Biography. Vol. 9. London: Smith, Elder & Co.
