= Maplestead =

Maplestead may refer to:

- Great Maplestead, a village in Essex
- Little Maplestead, a village in Essex
  - Little Maplestead Preceptory, a friary in Essex
