= International Journal of Lexicography =

- Discipline: Lexicography
- Language: English
- Edited by: Robert Lew

Publication details
- History: 1988–present
- Publisher: Oxford University Press (United Kingdom)
- Frequency: Quarterly
- Impact factor: 1.107 (2016)

Standard abbreviations
- ISO 4: Int. J. Lexicogr.

Indexing
- ISSN: 0950-3846 (print); 1477-4577 (web)
- LCCN: 92640007
- OCLC no.: 18409655

Links
- Journal homepage

The International Journal of Lexicography is a peer-reviewed academic journal in the field of lexicography published by Oxford University Press. It was established in 1988 and appears four times a year. Current editor in chief is Robert Lew (Adam Mickiewicz University in Poznań).

== Aims and scope ==
The journal is concerned with all aspects of lexicography, but places a special emphasis on dictionaries of major European languages. Apart from research papers - also in related fields, e.g. computational linguistics - it publishes reviews of dictionaries and contributions on practical aspects of lexicographic work.
