= Nicolas Tindal =

English historian and translator

Rev Nicolas Tindal, a portrait by George Knapton

Nicolas Tindal (1687 – 27 June 1774) was the translator and continuer of the History of England by Paul de Rapin. Very few comprehensive histories existed at the time and Tindal wrote a three-volume 'Continuation', a history of the Kingdom from the reigns of James II to George II. Tindal was Rector of Alverstoke in Hampshire, Vicar of Great Waltham, Essex, Chaplain of Greenwich Hospital and a Fellow of Trinity College, Oxford.

== Background ==
Tindal's father, John Tindal, the Rector of Cornwood, Devon and Vicar of St Ives, Cornwall, was the brother of Matthew Tindal, the eminent deist and author of 'Christianity as Old as the Creation'. A near relation of Thomas, 1st Lord Clifford, Lord High Treasurer of Charles II, the Tindal family were derived from Baron Adam de Tindale, a tenant in chief of Henry II.

Tindal went up to Exeter College, Oxford, where he took an MA degree in 1713. From Oxford, he took up his rectory in Hampshire and was later appointed a Fellow of Trinity. When Tindal mastered the French language is unclear, although he was the first member of his family to bear the French spelling of his name - a very popular one amongst his descendants. However, he first engaged in his life's work of historical translation with the publication, in monthly numbers, of his translation (from the French of Antoine Augustin Calmet) of the "Dissertation of the Excellency of the History of the Hebrews above that of any other Nation, wherein are examined the Antiquities and History of the Assyrians, Chaldans, Egyptians, Phoeninicans, Chinese &c. with the Peopling of America... Written in French by R. P. D'Augustin Calmet", which appears to have been a considerable undertaking. Tindal went on to write a History of Essex, having become Vicar of Great Waltham, although this project never came to fruition.

== 'History of England' & the 'Continuation' ==
Tindal's great work was his thirteen volume translation of Rapin's History, which was first published in 1727. We learn that he had been appointed Chaplain to the Fleet from his dedication of the earlier volumes, one of which was written in Gibraltar. Tindal enlarged the volumes in their second edition (1732) to contain notes, genealogical tables and maps of his own composition. The work was a great contribution to the development of British historiography of the eighteenth century as so few well written histories existed at the time; and none of them so comprehensive. While the works are principally of narrative form, the discursive analysis of many of the sources and contentions of a number of periods was very advanced for its time. Tindal was rewarded by the presentation of a gold medal by Frederick, Prince of Wales, to whom he had dedicated the second volume

A product of the Hardwicke circle (with Thomas Birch heavily involved), the Continuation (1744–47) appeared alongside opposition Country-Whig histories by William Guthrie and James Ralph—Guthrie’s General History of England (1744–51) to 1688, and Ralph’s The History of England, During the Reigns of King William, Queen Anne, and King George I (1744–46) for the post-Revolution period.

Rapin had finished his work at the death of James II, giving Tindal the opportunity of demonstrating his own historical abilities. His Continuation brought forward the works to the reign of George II. Tindal's work was much valued at the time, although not without controversy. Some had questioned the authorship of the Continuation; although there is no evidence to support those contentions and his many other works and literary style point to his pen.

== Other works and life ==
An engraving based on Knapton's portrait.. The Tindal arms shown are those of Deane, whom the Tindal/Tyndale family represent, together with the ancient crest of Tyndale

Tindal continued his translations with that of Prince Cantemir's History of the Othman Empire' (sic) in 1734. The 'Guide to Classical Learning, or Polymetis abridged, for Schools', of which he was editor, was a rare classical text-book which remained of importance throughout the century.

Tindal appears to have attracted some controversy during his life. Aside from that relating to his 'Continuation', he was engaged in a bitter dispute with one Eustace Budgell about his apparent disinheritance by his uncle, Matthew Tindal. Budgell had adopted some of Tindal's freethinking views and assisted him in publishing his 'Christianity as Old as the Creation'. However, he had fallen on hard times, losing up to £20,000 in the South Sea Bubble. It was therefore of some surprise that Matthew Tindal had apparently left the greater part of his fortune to this man, to the exclusion of Tindal, who had been named in a previously published will. Budgell was prosecuted for forgery but committed suicide by drowning himself in the Thames before the case came to trial. Whether Tindal was ever repaid the 2000 guineas of which he had been defrauded is unclear, though Alexander Pope declaimed:

Let Budgell charge low Grub-street on my quill,
And write whate-er he please, except my Will.

Tindal himself was recorded as saying of Garrick that 'The deaf hear him in his action, and the blind see him in his voice.'.

Tindal's long association with Greenwich Hospital and the Naval Office is commemorated by a portrait by George Knapton, now in the collection of the National Maritime Museum, Greenwich From this was taken the engraving that illustrates this article.

== Family ==
Tindal's son, Capt George Tindal, RN, purchased Coval Hall, Chelmsford, during Tindal's lifetime, where the family were based for some generations. His great grandson, Sir Nicolas Conyngham Tindal, was Lord Chief Justice of the Common Pleas from 1829 - 1843.

== Legacy ==
The authors of the ninth volume of the Cambridge History of English and American Literature conclude that

English historical writing owes [Tindal] a great debt; for, like Rapin himself, whom he introduced to English readers, he provided a solid substructure of well-authenticated and well-arranged facts, together with a narrative free from party bias and written with a single-minded desire to record ascertained truth. It should be added that master and follower alike cite their authorities without ostentation but with perfect clearness, and that the English folios are supplied with an admirable collection of portraits, maps and plans.

== Sources ==
- Noggle, James (2004) "Literary Taste as Counter-Enlightenment in Hume's History of England" in SEL: Studies in English Literature 1500–1900 - Volume 44, Number 3, summer 2004, pp. 617–638
- Nichols, John (1812) Literary Anecdotes Article on Nicolas Tindal
- Gentlemen's Magazine (1733) Vol III p 356
- New Dictionary of National Biography ('DNB') (Oxford, 2004)
- Tindal, Nicolas The Continuation of Mr Rapin's History of England
- 'Encyclopædia Britannica (1823): Article on Budgell, p 778
- Byron, George Gordon; Moore, Thomas (ed) (1859) 'The Poetical Works of Lord Byron' p 452 (note)
- Nichols, John (1812) Literary Anecdotes of the Eighteenth Century, Vol IX: "Genealogy of the Family of Tindal of Northumberland, Devon & Essex".
- Burke's Landed Gentry (1863): 'Tindal of Chelmsford'
- Website of the National Maritime Museum
