= Matthew Tindal =

English deist author

Matthew Tindal (1657 – 16 August 1733) was an eminent English deist author. His works, highly influential at the dawn of the Enlightenment, caused great controversy and challenged the Christian consensus of his time.

== Biography ==
Tindal was baptised on 12 May 1657 at Bere Ferrers in Devon, son of the Reverend John Tindal (rector of the parish) and of his wife Anne Halse. Through his mother, he was a first cousin of Thomas Clifford, 1st Lord Clifford of Chudleigh, and therefore descended from the Clifford and Fortescue families.

Tindal studied arts and law at Lincoln College, Oxford, under the high-churchman George Hickes, Dean of Worcester, and then at Exeter College, Oxford; in 1678 he was elected fellow of All Souls College. In a timely profession of faith, (Note: King James II, England's last Catholic monarch, promoted Catholicism during his reign (1685 to 1688).) in 1685 he saw "that upon his High Church notions a separation from the Church of Rome could not be justified", and accordingly he joined the latter. But discerning "the absurdities of popery", he returned to the Church of England at Easter 1688.

Between the early 1690s and his death in 1733, Tindal made major contributions in various areas. As Deputy Judge Advocate of the Fleet he had a large influence on the case-law on piracy, such as his contributions to the 1693–1694 trial of John Golden. Wayne Hudson identifies the Tindal of the 1690s as a Commonwealthman — one of the dissident Whigs — and Tindal's timely pamphlet on the freedom of the press was hugely influential in ending the legal requirement that all publications be licensed before being printed. His book Rights of the Christian Church (1706ff) had an immense impact on church/state relations and on the growth of freethinking. Tindal's Christianity as old as the Creation (1730), a statement of the deist understanding of Christianity, became highly influential in England and on the Continent.

== Works ==
=== Early works ===
His early works were an Essay of Obedience to the Supreme Powers (1694); an Essay on the Power of the Magistrate and the Rights of Mankind in Matters of Religion (1697); and The Liberty of the Press (1698). The first of his two larger works, The Rights of the Christian Church asserted against the Romish and all other priests who claim an independent power over it, pt. i., appeared anonymously in 1706. The book was regarded in its day as a forcible defence of the Erastian theory of the supremacy of the state over the Church, and at once provoked criticism and abuse.

After several attempts to proscribe the work had failed, a case against the author, publisher and printer succeeded on 14 December 1707, and another against a bookseller for selling a copy the next day. The prosecution did not prevent the issue of a fourth edition and gave the author the opportunity of issuing A Defence of the Rights of the Christian Church, in two parts (2nd ed., 1709). The book was, by order of the House of Commons, burned, along with Sacheverell's sermon, by the common hangman (1710). It continued to be the subject of denunciation for years, and Tindal believed he was charged by Dr Gibson, bishop of London, in a Pastoral Letter, with having undermined religion and promoted atheism and infidelity — a charge to which he replied in the anonymous tract, An Address to the Inhabitants of London and Westminster, a second and larger edition of which appeared in 1730. In this tract he makes a valiant defence of the deists, and anticipates here and there his Christianity as Old as the Creation.

=== Christianity as Old as the Creation ===
Christianity as Old as the Creation; or, the Gospel a Republication of the Religion of Nature (London, 1730, 2nd ed., 1731; 3rd, 1732; 4th, 1733), came to be regarded as the "Bible" of deism. It was really only the first part of the whole work, and the second, though written and entrusted in manuscript to a friend, never saw the light. The work evoked many replies, of which the ablest were by James Foster (1730), John Conybeare (1732), John Leland (1733) and Bishop Butler (1736).

Christianity as Old as the Creation was translated into German by J. Lorenz Schmidt (1741), and from it dates the influence of English deism on German theology. Tindal had probably adopted the principles it expounds before he wrote his essay of 1697. He claimed the name of "Christian deist", holding that true Christianity is identical with the eternal religion of nature.

Waring states that Tindal's Christianity as Old as the Creation (1730) "became, very soon after its publication, the focal center of the deist controversy. Because almost every argument, quotation, and issue raised for decades can be found here, the work is often termed 'the deist's Bible'."

Unlike the earlier system of Lord Herbert of Cherbury which relied on the notion of innate ideas, Tindal's system was based on the empirical principles of Locke. It assumed the traditional deistic antitheses of external and internal, positive and natural, revelations and religions. It starts from the assumptions that true religion must, from the nature of God and things, be eternal, universal, simple and perfect; that this religion can consist of nothing but the simple and universal duties towards God and man, the first consisting in the fulfilment of the second—in other words, the practice of morality.

The author's moral system, is essentially utilitarian. True revealed religion is simply a republication of the religion of nature or reason, and Christianity, if it is the perfect religion, can only be that republication, and must be as old as creation. The special mission of Christianity, therefore, is simply to deliver men from the superstition which had perverted the religion of nature. True Christianity must be a perfectly "reasonable service," reason must be supreme, and the Scriptures as well as all religious doctrines must submit; only those writings can be regarded as divine Scripture which tend to the honour of God and the good of man.

Tindal's 'deist Bible' redefined the foundation of deist epistemology as knowledge based on experience or human reason. This effectively widened the gap between traditional Christians and what he called "Christian deists" since this new foundation required that revealed truth be validated through human reason. In Christianity as Old as the Creation, Tindal articulates many prominent facets of deism that have continued to characterize that belief:

- He argues against special revelation: "God designed all Mankind should at all times know, what he wills them to know, believe, profess, and practice; and has given them no other Means for this, but the Use of Reason."
