= Paul de Rapin =

French historian

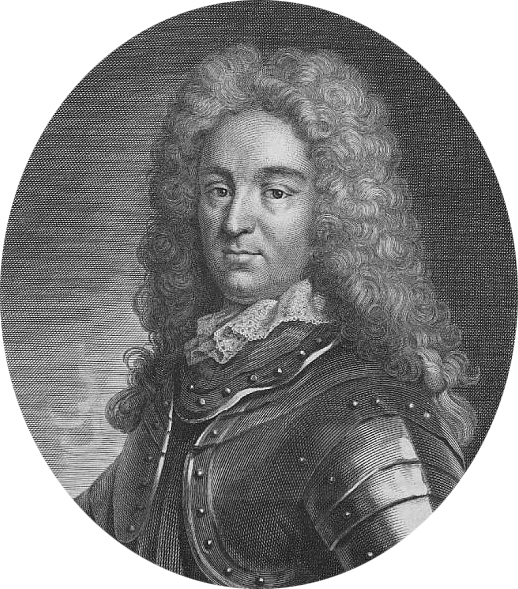
A 1743 illustration of de Rapin

Paul de Rapin (25 March 1661 – 25 April 1725), sieur of Thoyras (and therefore styled de Rapin de Thoyras), was a Huguenot historian writing under English patronage. His History of England, written and first published in French in 1724–27, was an influential exposition of the Whig view of history on both sides of the English Channel.

== Early life and education ==
The son of Jacques de Rapin, an avocat at Castres, Languedoc; his mother Jeanne was the sister of Paul Pellisson, official historian to Louis XIV. (Note: The family originally came from Savoie. One of his ancestors had supported Henry IV of France, another was governor in Montauban.) He was educated at the Academy of Saumur, a Protestant academic institution.

== Career ==
In 1679, he became an advocate, but he never practised law. Soon after, he joined the army. The revocation of the Edict of Nantes in 1685, and the death of his father led him to move to England with his brother. Inclined to a military career, but unable to find work, he went on to the Dutch Republic where he enlisted in a company of French army cadets at Utrecht, commanded by his cousin, Daniel de Rapin. Rapin met the 15-years-old Jean de Bodt and seven-year old Jean de Collas, also Huguenots. They accompanied William III to England in 1688 (Glorious Revolution); Collas became a page of the queen Mary II of England.

De Rapin and de Both joined in Ulster under the command of the 1st Earl of Athlone. During the Williamite war in Ireland de Rapin took part in the Siege of Carrickfergus, the Battle of the Boyne, and was wounded at the Siege of Limerick (1690). Soon afterwards he was promoted to captain; but in 1693 he was asked to become tutor to the Henry, Viscount Woodstock. Rapin accompanied his father William Bentinck, 1st Earl of Portland, a diplomat, at the Peace of Ryswick (1697), perhaps also to Paris in the year after; in a very costly entourage. Bentinck was sent as ambassador to Paris for six months. While there, he opened negotiations with Louis XIV for a partition of the Spanish monarchy, and as William's representative, signed the two partition treaties, known as the Treaty of The Hague (1698). Because of this Treaty all the diplomats settled in the Hague. In April 1699 Paul de Rapin married the widow Marie-Anne Testart (1676–1749) in a tiny village called Sloterdijk outside Amsterdam.

In 1701, Bentinck resigned all his offices in the royal household. A parliamentary enquiry found him guilty of high treason for his role in the secret negotiations over the Treaty of The Hague (1698). The House of Commons' dubious conviction was overturned by the House of Lords. However, he lost all his Irish estates after a critical report by a parliamentary committee. Travelling with his 19-year-old pupil between 1701 and 1703 to Hanover, Vienna and Toscane, both parties sent letters to Bentinck. Numerous letters shed light on the preparation of the voyage, the problematic relationship between the teenager and his teacher. Sophia of Hanover admired him. After 1704 – when Henry married – de Rapin started secretly a new project, writing a new, impartial history of England.

In 1705, he visited or lived in the Prussian town Wesel, as one of his children was baptized there. Wesel had a considerable Huguenot community, almost a thousand in 1697. The French architect and engineer Jean de Bodt was reshaping Wesel citadel in the style of Vauban. With the financial participation of the Dutch, the largest fortress in Brandenburg-Prussia at the time was built over the next 40 years – as a barricade against the expansionist ambitions of Louis XIV. (Note: Re-establishing the Barrier cities was the primary Dutch objective during the War of the Spanish Succession and was specified in Article 5 of the Treaty of The Hague (1701), which reformed the Grand Alliance.) Rapin settled there perhaps with the protection of Frederick I of Prussia and Sophia of Hanover, the English heir presumptive. He may have disagreed with the Second Stadtholderless period too. In 1706 his wife received a considerable amount of money and jewelry; Rapin was involved as executor of the will of his sister-in-law, the wealthy Henriette Testart.

Rapin de Thoyras and his wife probably had eleven children, four were baptized in the Hague and six in Wesel; five died young.

He was the author of a Dissertation sur les Whigs et les Torys (1717), which was immediately translated into German, Dutch, Danish, and English.

== Histoire d'Angleterre ==
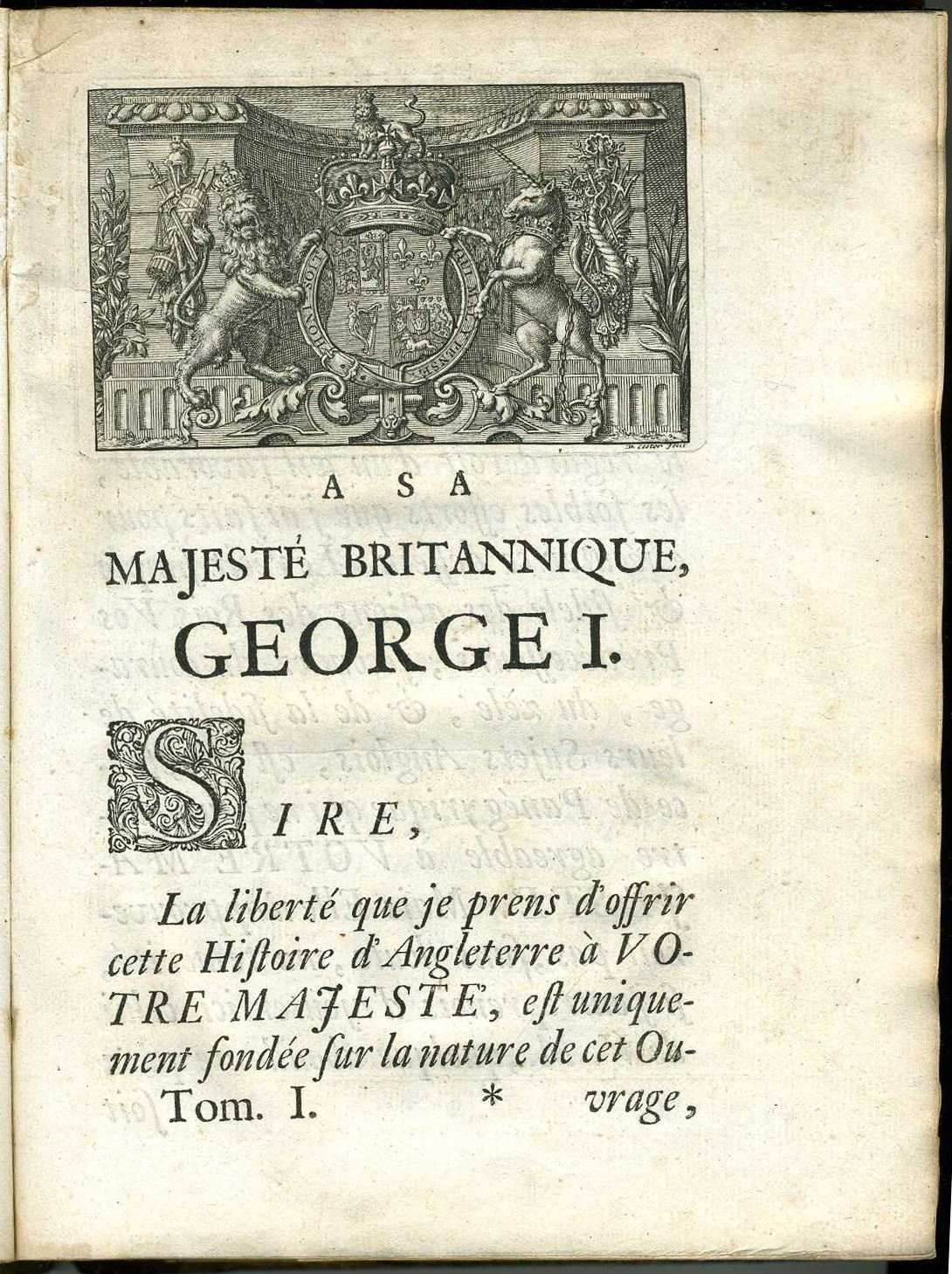
English Royal Dedication in Volume I of original French Edition of de Rapin's Histoire d'Angleterre of 1724.

It was at Wesel that he began his great work: Histoire d'Angleterre (History of England), an impartial account written for foreigners rather than for Englishmen. Rapin's ‘History’ begins with the landing of Julius Cæsar and ends with the accession of William and Mary. It was continued in French by David Durand (d. 1763), a Huguenot refugee. He added to Rapin's ‘History’ vols. xi. and xii. treating the reign of William III, published at the Hague in 1734–5.

- Volume I (1724): an account of Britain from the time of the Ancient British down to the Norman Conquest;
- Volume II: from William the Conqueror to Henry III;
- Volume III: from Edward I to Henry V;
- Volume IV: from Henry VI to Henry VII;
- Volume V: Henry VIII;
- Volume VI: from Edward VI to Elizabeth I;
- Volume VII (1725): James I and the beginning of Charles I;
- Volume VIII: Charles I;
- Volume IX (1727): Charles II;
- Volume X: James II and William III and Mary II.

L'Histoire d'Angleterre was published monthly with illustrations and allegorical end pieces designed and engraved by François Morellon la Cave, and with a dedicatory epistle to King George I. The written style is lucid and effective. He stopped writing after dealing with the execution of Charles I of England in 1649.

All volumes of his work were translated to English in a total of 14 volumes from 1727 by the Reverend Nicolas Tindal. Tindal began this great task while a chaplain to the Royal Navy, as attested in his foreword to an early volume. He added large numbers of informative notes throughout the volumes, which were illustrated with engravings, maps and genealogical tables of great quality. Illustrations were commissioned from Jacobus Houbraken. Many of the borders being designed by Thomas Gainsborough and George Vertue. Tindal also added a "Continuation" to the History, covering the years from the accession of James VI and I to that of George I of Great Britain.

Although written in French this work was produced for the endorsement of the British monarchy, and at the time of its publication, for the House of Hanover. For this reason the epistle Dedicatory, printed beneath a very elegant engraving of the Royal Arms, is of interest. The following is a translation of it:

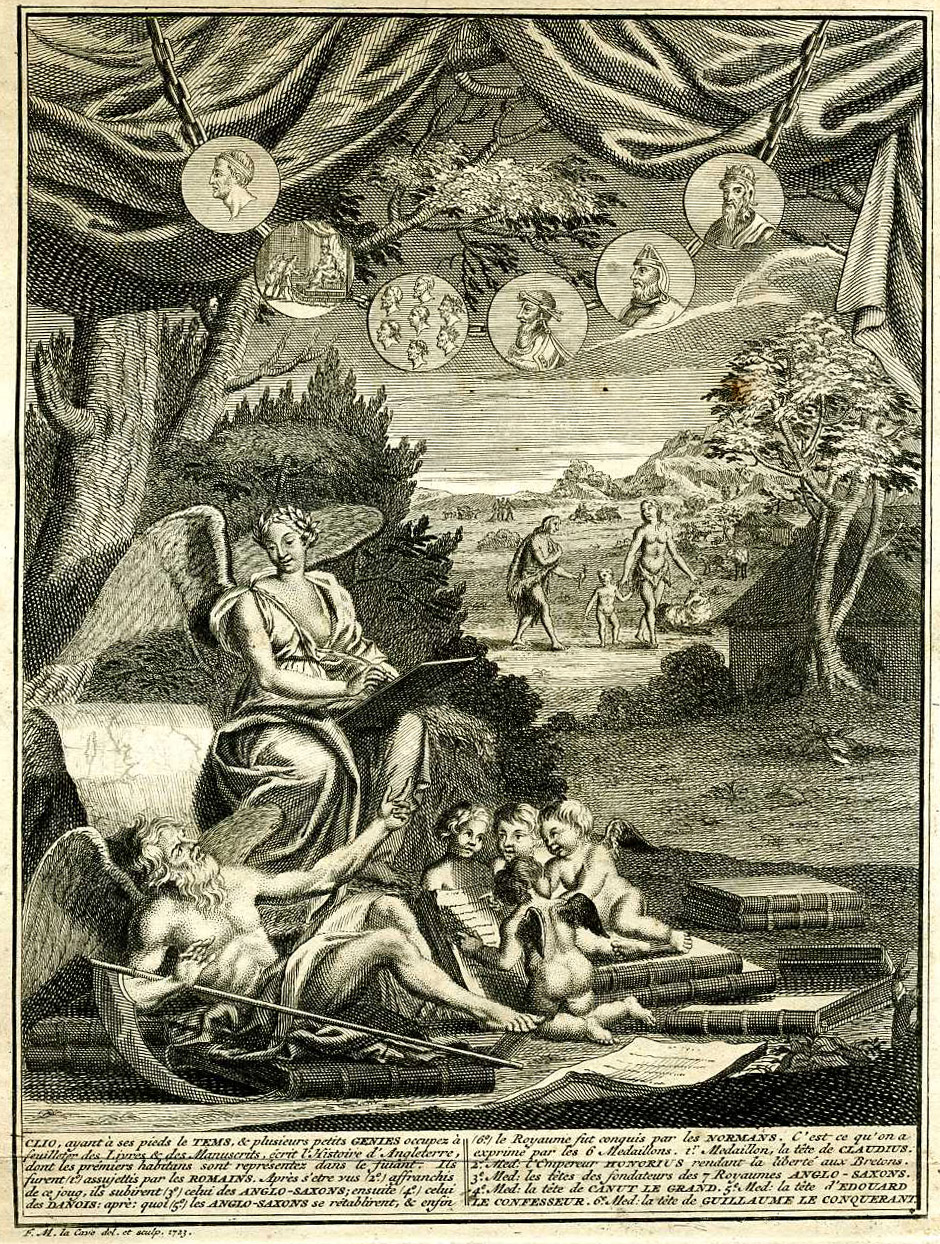
Frontispiece to Volume I of original French Edition of de Rapin's Histoire d'Angleterre of 1724, designed and engraved by François Morellon la Cave. The image shows Clio and Time, with the original inhabitants in the background scene. The medallions depict: 1. Claudius, 2. Honorius granting rights to the cities of Britain, 3. Saxon Heptarchs, 4. Cnut, 5. Edward the Confessor, 6. William the Conqueror.

To His Britannic Majesty, GEORGE I:
Sire,
The liberty which I take in offering this History of England to YOUR MAJESTY, is based uniquely on the nature of this Work, in which I have set myself the task of instructing Foreigners in the origin and the progressions of the English Monarchy. As no-one takes more interest than Your Majesty in the glory of England, I have hoped that He would look with a favourable eye upon the feeble efforts which I have made to execute this design. The simple and faithful recital of the actions of the Kings, Your Predecessors, backed by the courage, the zeal, and the faithfulness of their English Subjects, is a kind of Panegyrique which can only be agreeable to Your Majesty. But He doubtless would not approve my temerity, if I were to undertake to add here that of Your Majesty, however abundant the material for it might be. That is a task which should be reserved for more eloquent pens than mine. I am content, SIRE, to have furnished for my Readers a ready means by which to compare the Reign of Your Majesty with the preceding Reigns, and the opportunity to observe, how attentive Your Majesty is to follow in the tracks of the Kings of England which were most distinguished by their virtues, and by their sincere love for their People – and with what care He distances himself from the false paths in which some have unfortunately gone astray. One will see clearly in this History, that the constant union of the Sovereign with his Parliament, is the most solid foundation for the glory of the Prince and the welfare of the Subjects; and from the little that one may have learnt of what is happening in England since Your Majesty took the Throne, one cannot but be convinced, that that indeed is the invariable principle upon which Your Majesty governs his conduct. I should account myself extremely fortunate, SIRE, if my zeal for Your Majesty should obtain for me a gracious acceptance of my very humble homage, and if Your Majesty were to deign to approve my sincere protestation, that I am, with a very profound respect, SIRE, the very humble and very obedient servant of Your Majesty,
THOYRAS RAPIN.

The original version was almost the only English history available in France in the first half of the 18th century.

It was in his description of the reign of Stephen, King of England that de Rapin made perhaps his most enduring contribution to English history: he was the first historian to describe the reign as an "anarchy": "In the fatal anarchy, the barons acting as sovereigns grievously oppressed the people and were so presumptuous as to coin their own money." As a result, the civil war between 1138 and 1153 is now widely referred to as The Anarchy.

Though de Rapin was of a strong constitution, the seventeen years he spent on the work ruined his health. One of his grandchildren was Theophile Cazenove.

One of his third great-grandchildren was Count von Zeppelin.

== Sources ==
- Napoleon Bonaparte, "Paul de Rapin-Thoyras," Napoleon’s Notes on English History made on the Eve of the French Revolution, illustrated from Contemporary Historians and referenced from the findings of Later Research by Henry Foljambe Hall. New York: E. P. Dutton & Co., 1905, xx–xxv.
