= List of rivers of the Maule Region =

The information regarding List of rivers in the Maule Region on this page has been compiled from the data supplied by GeoNames. It includes all features named "Rio", "Canal", "Arroyo", "Estero" and those Feature Code is associated with a stream of water. (Note: The arbitrarily selected codes are RPDS, CHN, CNLA, CNLB, CNLD, CNLI, CNLN, CNLSB, CRKT, DTCH, DTCHI, DTCHD, ESTY, FORD, SBED, STM, STMA, STMB, STMC, STMD, STMH, STMI, STMIX, STMM, STMQ, STMS, STMSB, STMX, TNLC, WTRC, WTRH) This list contains 256 water streams.

== Content ==
This list contains:

1. Name of the stream, in Spanish Language
2. Coordinates are latitude and longitude of the feature in ± decimal degrees, at the mouth of the stream
3. Link to a map including the Geonameid (a number which uniquely identifies a Geoname feature)
4. Feature Code explained in
5. Other names for the same feature, if any
6. Basin countries additional to Chile, if any

== List ==
Rivers of the Maule Region

- Río Mataquito • 34.97301°S 72.18512°W • 3880346 • STM • (Rio Mataquito, Río Mataquito)

- Río Teno • 34.97947°S 71.38621°W • 3869976 • STM

- Río Claro (Teno) • 34.9972°S 70.81856°W • 3894569 • STM
- Río Malo (Teno) • 35.11304°S 70.4865°W • 3880821 • STM
- Río Nacimiento (Teno) • 35.10021°S 70.4895°W • 3879117 • STM

- Río Lontué • 34.98018°S 71.38662°W • 3882528 • STM

- Río Colorado (Lontué) • 35.27401°S 71.01461°W • 3894030 • STM
- Río Palos de San Pedro • 35.39405°S 70.86563°W • 3877531 • STM • (Rio Palos de San Pedro, Rio Patos de San Pedro, Río Palos de San Pedro, Río Patos de San Pedro)

- Río Huenchullami • 35.11991°S 72.21253°W • 3887659 • STM • (Estero Huenchullami, Rio Huenchullami, Río Huenchullami)
- Río Barroso • 35.30776°S 70.8044°W • 3898640 • STM
- Estero Cabrera • 35.30858°S 70.93718°W • 3897569 • STM
- Río Maule • 35.3173°S 72.41055°W • 3880305 • STM

- Río Claro (Maule) • 35.46381°S 71.87994°W • 3894568 • STM

- Río Lircay • 35.37929°S 71.64834°W • 3883101 • STM • (Rio Lircai, Rio Lircay, Río Lircai, Río Lircay)

- Río Loncomilla • 35.57453°S 71.75483°W • 3882578 • STM • (Rio Loncomilla, Rio Lonconilla, Río Loncomilla, Río Lonconilla)

- Río Putagán • 35.70056°S 71.76918°W • 3874566 • STM
- Río Achibueno • 35.783°S 71.79571°W • 3900690 • STM • (Rio Achibueno, Rio Archibueno, Río Achibueno, Río Archibueno)

- Río Ancoa • 35.91558°S 71.50804°W • 3899712 • STM

- Río Longaví • 35.83226°S 71.82025°W • 3882556 • STM
- Río Perquilauquén • 35.83325°S 71.82024°W • 3876475 • STM

- Río Purapel • 35.82196°S 71.97724°W • 3874616 • STM
- Río Cauquenes • 35.88232°S 72.03553°W • 3896101 • STM

- Río Tutuvén • 35.97791°S 72.29778°W • 3868854 • STM

- Río Melado • 35.71326°S 71.0751°W • 3880124 • STM

- Río Barroso • 35.3176°S 70.70396°W • 3898641 • STM
- Río Negro • 35.33035°S 70.66116°W • 3878785 • STM
- Estero San Francisco • 35.58333°S 71.86667°W • 3872216 • STM
- Estero Botacura • 36.04469°S 70.82355°W • 3898007 • STM • (Arroyo Botacura, Estero Botacura)
- Estero Huedque • 36.05448°S 72.45734°W • 3887727 • STM
- Río San Juan • 36.14294°S 72.50263°W • 3872010 • STM
- Estero Vega Honda • 36.16667°S 72.11667°W • 3868542 • STM
- Río Ñiquén • 36.16966°S 72.10782°W • 3878606 • STM
- Estero Pidihuinco • 34.82415°S 71.01°W • 3876169 • STM
- Estero del Cardonal • 34.83675°S 72.14265°W • 3896698 • STM
- Estero Vichuquén • 34.84269°S 72.02925°W • 3868338 • STM
- Estero Huiñe • 34.84849°S 72.04194°W • 3887500 • STM
- Estero Lipimávida • 34.85072°S 72.14257°W • 3883115 • STM
- Estero Tilicura • 34.85°S 72.03333°W • 3869841 • STM
- Estero Patacón • 34.86802°S 71.87278°W • 3877038 • STM
- Estero Comalle • 34.86812°S 71.31015°W • 3893967 • STM
- Estero Boquil • 34.86874°S 71.91306°W • 3898049 • STM
- Estero Pichibudi • 34.87929°S 72.15651°W • 3876306 • STM
- Estero Las Cardillas • 34.8865°S 71.99346°W • 3884518 • STM • (Estero Las Cardillas, Estero Los Cardillos, Estero las Cardillas)
- Estero Uraco • 34.88697°S 71.99392°W • 3868779 • STM
- Estero Quilico • 34.89315°S 71.91033°W • 3874214 • STM
- Estero de Concaven • 34.91596°S 72.01167°W • 3893896 • STM
- Estero Duao • 34.92733°S 72.18224°W • 3892179 • STM
- Río Seco • 34.9313°S 71.33077°W • 3871053 • STM
- Estero El Parrón • 34.93728°S 71.5763°W • 3890810 • STM • (Estero El Parron, Estero El Parrón, Estero Parron, Estero Parrón)
- Estero de Los Altos de Caune • 34.9378°S 71.57667°W • 3882445 • STM • (Estero de Los Altos de Caune, Estero de los Altos de Caune)
- Estero El Buitre • 34.944°S 71.61717°W • 3891810 • STM
- Estero El Guapi • 34.94792°S 72.1783°W • 3891292 • STM
- Estero Iloca • 34.94812°S 72.17866°W • 3887338 • STM
- Estero Tilicura • 34.96173°S 71.36072°W • 3869840 • STM
- Estero El Buche • 34.96713°S 71.72393°W • 3891825 • STM
- Estero Rancura • 34.96802°S 72.18335°W • 3873754 • STM
- Estero El Peñón • 34.98458°S 72.18067°W • 3890761 • STM
- Estero La Pellana • 34.99553°S 71.76481°W • 3885049 • STM
- Estero Guaiquillo • 34.99935°S 71.23473°W • 3888585 • STM
- Estero de los Pejerreyes • 34.99956°S 70.77318°W • 3876850 • STM • (Arroyo de los Pejerreyes, Estero de los Pejerreyes)
- Estero Chequenlemillo • 34.99989°S 71.23488°W • 3895239 • STM
- Estero Potrero Grande • 35.01084°S 71.07575°W • 3875272 • STM
- Estero Coquimbo • 35.01667°S 72.15°W • 3893626 • STM
- Estero Limávida • 35.0186°S 71.76746°W • 3883195 • STM
- Estero Los Cuervos • 35.03982°S 72.16887°W • 3882102 • STM
- Estero Molino • 35.04776°S 72.08317°W • 3879604 • STM
- Río Infiernillo • 35.04816°S 70.60394°W • 3887200 • STM
- Río Maitenes • 35.04846°S 70.51877°W • 3880922 • STM • (Rio Los Maitenes, Rio Maitenes, Río Los Maitenes, Río Maitenes)
- Estero Lídico • 35.05°S 72.18333°W • 3883254 • STM
- Estero Hullinlebu • 35.05693°S 71.91358°W • 3887461 • STM
- Estero Huelón • 35.07405°S 72.04055°W • 3887698 • STM
- Estero Las Máquinas • 35.08333°S 72.03333°W • 3884205 • STM
- Estero Laguna • 35.08333°S 72.06667°W • 3885788 • STM
- Estero Oñolco • 35.09048°S 71.9641°W • 3878060 • STM
- Río Caona • 35.09994°S 70.48931°W • 3896859 • STM
- Río Seco • 35.11438°S 71.19564°W • 3871052 • STM
- Estero Rapilermo • 35.11463°S 71.95321°W • 3873708 • STM
- Estero El Durazno • 35.11667°S 71.7°W • 3891450 • STM
- Estero Culenar • 35.11667°S 71.66667°W • 3893061 • STM
- Estero Carretón • 35.13333°S 71.31667°W • 3896521 • STM
- Estero Curipel • 35.1335°S 71.91321°W • 3892844 • STM
- Estero Conca • 35.13596°S 72.18208°W • 3893899 • STM
- Río Vergara • 35.13924°S 70.47434°W • 3868386 • STM
- Estero Población • 35.14217°S 71.88889°W • 3875599 • STM
- Río Cajones • 35.15535°S 70.70341°W • 3897381 • STM
- Río Zorras • 35.1574°S 70.41552°W • 3867480 • STM
- Estero Pudú • 35.1596°S 72.14137°W • 3875055 • STM
- Río Hospitales • 35.17251°S 70.67993°W • 3887816 • STM
- Estero Potrero Grande • 35.17814°S 71.09773°W • 3875271 • STM
- Estero Upeo • 35.18498°S 71.10643°W • 3868786 • STM
- Estero Junquillar • 35.19162°S 72.34281°W • 3886696 • STM
- Estero Quillayes • 35.20238°S 72.21764°W • 3874148 • STM • (Estero Quillayes, Quebrada Los Quillayes)
- Estero Loma Blanca • 35.20529°S 72.14343°W • 3882632 • STM
- Estero Villa Hueso • 35.21667°S 71.43333°W • 3868178 • STM
- Estero Los Queñes • 35.21667°S 70.98333°W • 3881480 • STM
- Estero Tabunco • 35.21971°S 72.02774°W • 3870364 • STM
- Estero Gualleco • 35.22064°S 72.01339°W • 3888534 • STM • (Estero Gualleco, Estero Las Tizas)
- Estero Coyanco • 35.23333°S 72.31667°W • 3893325 • STM • (Estero Coyanco, Quebrada Coyanco) • (CL)
- Estero de Putú • 35.2°S 72.31667°W • 3874541 • STM
- Estero Coipué • 35.24816°S 72.07911°W • 3894352 • STM
- Estero de Chagres • 35.25769°S 71.44051°W • 3895686 • STM
- Estero Las Palmas • 35.28185°S 71.76618°W • 3884081 • STM
- Estero Batuco • 35.28277°S 72.05603°W • 3898592 • STM
- Estero Botalcura • 35.28477°S 71.76605°W • 3898004 • STM
- Estero La Puente • 35.28526°S 72.21499°W • 3884901 • STM
- Estero Colorado • 35.28968°S 72.05908°W • 3894053 • STM
- Estero Cañete • 35.30268°S 72.32204°W • 3896922 • STM
- Estero El Guindo • 35.30371°S 71.4294°W • 3891280 • STM
- Estero Campusano • 35.30399°S 71.42896°W • 3897056 • STM
- Estero Las Águilas • 35.30511°S 72.08112°W • 3884665 • STM
- Estero La Verde • 35.30598°S 72.08°W • 3883550 • STM
- Estero La Obra • 35.30603°S 71.33096°W • 3885205 • STM
- Estero del Meadero • 35.30969°S 72.19621°W • 3880255 • STM
- Estero Las Pataguas • 35.31295°S 71.54395°W • 3884055 • STM
- Estero Tutucura • 35.31309°S 71.77382°W • 3868858 • STM
- Estero de Guenón • 35.31403°S 72.34613°W • 3888291 • STM
- Estero El Manzano • 35.31482°S 72.24168°W • 3891076 • STM
- Río San Pedro • 35.31554°S 70.76483°W • 3871792 • STM
- Estero La Puente • 35.31558°S 72.27044°W • 3884900 • STM • (Estero La Puente, Estero La Puerta)
- Estero Quivolgo • 35.31661°S 72.40234°W • 3873894 • STM
- Estero La Capilla • 35.31983°S 71.38096°W • 3886332 • STM
- Estero El Culenar • 35.32041°S 72.05611°W • 3891524 • STM
- Estero Los Robles • 35.32261°S 71.5214°W • 3881396 • STM
- Estero Pelarco • 35.33333°S 71.55°W • 3876799 • STM
- Estero Las Chilcas • 35.33714°S 71.53846°W • 3884473 • STM • (Estero Chilcas, Estero Las Chilcas)
- Río Nevado • 35.3418°S 70.50147°W • 3878710 • STM
- Estero El Pangue • 35.35366°S 71.57223°W • 3890832 • STM
- Estero Tricahue • 35.36278°S 71.42716°W • 3869120 • STM
- Estero Pelarco • 35.37119°S 71.46463°W • 3876798 • STM
- Estero Calabozo • 35°S 71.06667°W • 3897365 • STM
- Estero Las Vegas • 35.40643°S 72.20494°W • 3883789 • STM
- Estero Las Palmas • 35.42167°S 72.06674°W • 3884080 • STM
- Estero Picazo • 35.44155°S 71.34377°W • 3876326 • STM
- Estero Caiván • 35.44469°S 71.70619°W • 3897399 • STM
- Estero Tanguao • 35.44596°S 72.01329°W • 3870166 • STM
- Río Las Vegas • 35.45163°S 72.24538°W • 3883787 • STM
- Estero San José • 35.4539°S 70.71657°W • 3872093 • STM
- Arroyo del Descabezado • 35.45448°S 70.71648°W • 3892629 • STM
- Estero Los Puercos • 35.46034°S 71.88574°W • 3881490 • STM
- Estero Volcán • 35.46225°S 70.75936°W • 3867971 • STM
- Estero Los Robles • 35.47457°S 71.24647°W • 3881395 • STM
- Estero Tabón Tinaja • 35.48902°S 71.86871°W • 3870368 • STM
- Estero Nirivilo • 35.56062°S 72.09493°W • 3878598 • STM
- Río Pinotalca • 35.56195°S 72.61833°W • 3875898 • STM • (Rio Empedrado, Rio Pinotalca, Río Empedrado, Río Pinotalca)
- Río Perquin • 35.56654°S 71.49394°W • 3876472 • STM
- Río Loanco • 35.56667°S 72.61667°W • 3882807 • STM • (Rio Loanco, Rio Luanco, Río Loanco, Río Luanco) • (CL)
- Río Empedrado • 35.57805°S 72.52668°W • 3890118 • STM
- Estero Meneses • 35.59081°S 70.68029°W • 3880053 • STM
- Estero Las Lajas • 35.60421°S 72.47495°W • 3884256 • STM
- Estero Empedrado • 35.63658°S 72.45445°W • 3890119 • STM
- Estero Batuco • 35.64927°S 72.44365°W • 3898591 • STM
- Río Reloca • 35.65248°S 72.59652°W • 3873507 • STM
- Río Rari • 35.67652°S 72.40763°W • 3873691 • STM
- Estero Venegas • 35.67743°S 72.31964°W • 3868497 • STM
- Río Monsalve • 35.6876°S 70.62181°W • 3879491 • STM
- Estero Llamico • 35.6897°S 72.03998°W • 3883016 • STM
- Arroyo Trincahues • 35.7046°S 71.0759°W • 3869087 • STM
- Río Claro • 35.70637°S 71.07855°W • 3894567 • STM • (Rio Claro, Rio Olaro, Río Claro)
- Estero Santa Celia • 35.70721°S 71.76953°W • 3871634 • STM
- Estero Barroso • 35.70971°S 70.74543°W • 3898644 • STM • (Arroyo Barros, Estero Barroso)
- Río de la Invernada • 35.71022°S 70.74582°W • 3887139 • STM
- Estero Sauzal • 35.71465°S 72.06294°W • 3871178 • STM
- Estero Batuco • 35.73835°S 71.76831°W • 3898590 • STM
- Estero Las Mercedes • 35.7°S 72.28333°W • 3884176 • STM
- Estero San Francisco • 35.74532°S 70.47614°W • 3872215 • STM
- Estero Las Garzas • 35.75828°S 71.0043°W • 3884351 • STM
- Estero Chanco • 35.7607°S 72.5621°W • 3895488 • STM
- Estero Caballo Blanco • 35.7662°S 71.427°W • 3897641 • STM
- Estero Coihueco • 35.76667°S 72.48333°W • 3894403 • STM
- Estero Rari • 35.77528°S 71.44754°W • 3873692 • STM
- Estero de Abranquil • 35.77629°S 71.66341°W • 3900741 • STM
- Estero Las Toscas • 35.7766°S 71.73488°W • 3883850 • STM
- Estero Los Robles • 35.77905°S 71.54291°W • 3881394 • STM
- Estero Machicura • 35.78494°S 71.49171°W • 3881096 • STM
- Estero Torrentón • 35.78549°S 71.62958°W • 3869508 • STM
- Estero Los Apestados • 35.78552°S 71.66427°W • 3882416 • STM • (Estero Los Apestados, Los Apeslados)
- Estero La Matanza • 35.79634°S 71.47879°W • 3885367 • STM • (Estero La Matanza, Estero Manzana)
- Estero Pelluhué • 35.80741°S 72.56653°W • 3876745 • STMI
- Río Los Cipreses • 35.80877°S 70.83713°W • 3882193 • STM • (Rio Los Cipreces, Rio Los Ciprees, Rio Los Cipreses, Rio de los Cipreses, Río Los Cipreces, Río Los Ciprees, Río Los Cipreses, Río de los Cipreses)
- Estero Doña Toribia • 35.81379°S 72.33343°W • 3892283 • STM • (Estero Dona Toribia, Estero Doña Toribia, Estero Pena Toribia, Estero Peña Toribia)
- Estero Tronquilemo • 35.81667°S 72.33333°W • 3869041 • STM
- Estero Cunaco • 35.81673°S 71.75336°W • 3892984 • STM
- Río Puelche • 35.82978°S 70.71428°W • 3875037 • STM
- Río Puchepo • 35.83333°S 72.7°W • 3969258 • STM
- Río Curanipe • 35.84274°S 72.63693°W • 3892886 • STM
- Estero El Parrón • 35.84492°S 72.63723°W • 3890809 • STM • (Arroyo Parron, Arroyo Parrón, Estero El Parron, Estero El Parrón, Rio Parron, Río Parrón)
- Estero del Valle • 35.84532°S 70.70433°W • 3868664 • STM
- Estero Checuen • 35.84828°S 71.81213°W • 3895302 • STM
- Estero Saavedra • 35.84935°S 70.45803°W • 3872670 • STM
- Estero La Hora • 35.85106°S 70.4804°W • 3885648 • STM
- Estero Quiu-Quenes • 35.85241°S 71.45781°W • 3873897 • STM
- Estero Caldo Verde • 35.85264°S 72.01024°W • 3897307 • STM
- Estero Torreón • 35.85341°S 71.86916°W • 3869506 • STM
- Estero Huinganes • 35.86176°S 72.00491°W • 3887495 • STM
- Estero Belco • 35.86454°S 72.03545°W • 3898518 • STM
- Estero Remolinos • 35.86667°S 72.41667°W • 3873468 • STM
- Estero Bureo • 35.87372°S 71.82506°W • 3897713 • STM
- Estero Llollinco • 35.8738°S 71.73663°W • 3882847 • STM
- Río Chovellén • 35.87694°S 72.67421°W • 3894808 • STM • (Estero Chovellen, Rio Chovellen, Río Chovellén)
- Estero Lircay • 35.87802°S 71.43308°W • 3883102 • STM
- Estero Arenas • 35.89691°S 71.41609°W • 3899395 • STM
- Estero Piguchen • 35.90687°S 71.79252°W • 3876038 • STM
- Estero La Sombra • 35.90833°S 71.28814°W • 3884119 • STM
- Estero Arenal • 35.90916°S 72.06548°W • 3899401 • STM
- Estero del Molino • 35.91054°S 72.68874°W • 3879597 • STM • (Estero Molinos, Estero del Molino)
- Estero Liguay • 35.91465°S 71.72708°W • 3883245 • STM • (Estero Liguay, Rio Liguay, Río Liguay)
- Estero Curipeumo • 35.91576°S 72.02421°W • 3892842 • STM
- Estero Llepo • 35.91732°S 71.50773°W • 3882915 • STM
- Río del Rosal • 35.91975°S 72.34349°W • 3872837 • STM
- Arroyo Bravo • 35.933°S 70.49691°W • 3897950 • STM • (Arroyo Bravo, Estero Bravo)
- Río Blanco • 35.93385°S 70.59905°W • 3898212 • STM
- Río Baños • 35.93474°S 70.58001°W • 3898808 • STM
- Estero Piguchen • 35.9°S 71.8°W • 3876039 • STM
- Estero El Toro • 35.94561°S 70.99368°W • 3890258 • STM
- Estero Las Garzas • 35.96013°S 72.18467°W • 3884350 • STM
- Estero Chamávida • 35.96667°S 72.15°W • 3895592 • STM
- Quebrada Navío • 35.97657°S 71.48222°W • 3878971 • STM • (Estero Navio, Quebrada Navio, Quebrada Navío)
- Estero El Molino • 35.99605°S 70.95746°W • 3890980 • STM • (Arroyo del Molino, Estero El Molino)
- Estero Matancilla • 35.99986°S 71.62166°W • 3880362 • STM
- Río Coipo • 36.00136°S 72.21467°W • 3894361 • STM • (Estero Coipo, Rio Coipo, Río Coipo)
- Estero Membrillo • 36.00616°S 71.82242°W • 3880070 • STM • (Estero Chimbarongo, Estero Membrillo)
- Estero El Pejerrey • 36.01667°S 71.43333°W • 3890790 • STM
- Estero Camarico • 36.02353°S 72.38652°W • 3897178 • STM • (Camarica, Estero Camarico)
- Estero Parral • 36.02953°S 71.86942°W • 3877144 • STM
- Estero Coronel • 36.04489°S 72.43223°W • 3893530 • STM
- Estero El Pejerrey • 36.04925°S 71.40194°W • 3890789 • STM • (Estero El Pejerrey, Estero del Pejerrey)
- Estero Chimbarongo • 36.05°S 71.81667°W • 3895058 • STM
- Estero San Pedro • 36.06475°S 70.87213°W • 3871808 • STM
- Estero Nevados • 36.07029°S 71.13979°W • 3878707 • STM
- Estero Piedras de Amolar • 36.07251°S 72.09491°W • 3876066 • STM
- Estero Rodríguez • 36.07737°S 70.77657°W • 3872948 • STM
- Río La Puente • 36.08306°S 70.9181°W • 3884899 • STM
- Estero Gloria • 36.08342°S 71.14534°W • 3888975 • STM
- Estero Los Guayes • 36.08504°S 71.38965°W • 3882036 • STM • (Estero Los Guayes, Estero de los Guayes)
- Estero Hoyada Seca • 36.08656°S 70.92028°W • 3887807 • STM
- Estero Nieblas • 36.08741°S 70.54667°W • 3878679 • STM
- Estero Riecillos • 36.09452°S 71.1541°W • 3873317 • STM
- Río Guaiquivilo • 36.10207°S 70.91661°W • 3888583 • STM • (Rio Guaiquillo, Rio Guaiquivilo, Rio Melado Guaiquivilo, Río Guaiquivilo, Río Melado Guaiquivilo)
- Arroyo Calle • 36.10361°S 70.46747°W • 3897254 • STM
- Estero Castillo • 36.10801°S 71.07307°W • 3896237 • STM
- Estero Potrero Grande • 36.11853°S 71.1214°W • 3875270 • STM
- Estero Los Cristales • 36.1548°S 70.92326°W • 3882115 • STM • (Estero Los Cristales, Estero los Cristales)
- Estero de los Calabozos • 36.19804°S 70.90951°W • 3897359 • STM
- Río Relbún • 36.21239°S 70.9071°W • 3873519 • STM
- Estero Huinganes • 36.22866°S 71.38704°W • 3887494 • STM
- Estero Larqui • 36.23197°S 71.38337°W • 3884693 • STM
- Estero Farías • 36.23373°S 70.92018°W • 3889580 • STM • (Arroyo Faria, Arroyo Faría, Arroyo de Farias, Estero Farias, Estero Farías)
- Río Bullileo • 36.2375°S 71.44895°W • 3897727 • STM
- Estero Totora • 36.24231°S 70.91731°W • 3869446 • STM
- Estero Castillo • 36.25092°S 71.35331°W • 3896236 • STM
- Estero Gangas • 36.25392°S 70.95399°W • 3889138 • STM • (Estero Gangas, Rio de Gangas, Río de Gangas)
- Estero Deslinde • 36.25743°S 71.03261°W • 3892573 • STM
- Río Blanco • 36.26663°S 71.3359°W • 3898211 • STM
- Estero Botica • 36.27905°S 71.08925°W • 3898002 • STM
- Estero Molinillos • 36.28543°S 71.08245°W • 3879611 • STM
- Estero Hondo • 36.29546°S 70.74751°W • 3887921 • STM
- Estero Amargo • 36.30273°S 71.36005°W • 3899832 • STM
- Estero Paiva • 36.32107°S 70.76495°W • 3877717 • STM
- Estero El Toro • 36.32542°S 70.91228°W • 3890257 • STM
- Estero Bagres • 36.33453°S 70.90678°W • 3898999 • STM • (Arroyo Bagres, Estero Bagres)
- Estero Valdés • 36.33901°S 70.80111°W • 3868721 • STM
- Estero Cieneguitas • 36.34909°S 71.28386°W • 3894648 • STM
- Estero Los Bagres • 36.36408°S 70.89564°W • 3882377 • STM • (Estero Los Bagres, Estero los Bagres)
- Estero Ortegas • 36.37691°S 71.24038°W • 3877975 • STM • (Estero Ortegas, Estero Ortegus, Estero de Ortega)
- Estero Ponce • 36.41704°S 70.96309°W • 3875464 • STM
- Río Cisternas • 36.45524°S 70.99926°W • 3894593 • STM • (Cajon Cisternas, Cajón Cisternas, Rio Cisternas, Río Cisternas)

== See also ==
- List of lakes in Chile
- List of volcanoes in Chile
- List of islands of Chile
- List of fjords, channels, sounds and straits of Chile
- List of lighthouses in Chile
