= List of rivers of the Magallanes Region =

The information regarding List of rivers in the Magallanes Region on this page has been compiled from the data supplied by GeoNames. It includes all features named "Rio", "Canal", "Arroyo", "Estero" and those Feature Code is associated with a stream of water. (Note: The arbitrarily selected codes are RPDS, CHN, CNLA, CNLB, CNLD, CNLI, CNLN, CNLSB, CRKT, DTCH, DTCHI, DTCHD, ESTY, FORD, SBED, STM, STMA, STMB, STMC, STMD, STMH, STMI, STMIX, STMM, STMQ, STMS, STMSB, STMX, TNLC, WTRC, WTRH) This list contains 173 water streams.

== Content ==
This list contains:

1. Name of the stream, in Spanish Language
2. Coordinates are latitude and longitude of the feature in ± decimal degrees, at the mouth of the stream
3. Link to a map including the Geonameid (a number which uniquely identifies a Geoname feature)
4. Feature Code explained in
5. Other names for the same feature, if any
6. Basin countries additional to Chile, if any

== List ==
Parque Nacional Torres del Paine

- Rio Diablo • 48.98495°S 72.89515°W • 3859387 • STM • (Rio Diablo, Río Diablo) • (AR, CL)
- Arroyo Zanja Honda • 50.98333°S 72.41667°W • 3867568 • STM • (Arroyo Zanja Honda, Rio Zanja Honda, Río Zanja Honda, Zanja Honda) • (AR)
- Río Vizcachas • 51.01667°S 72.5°W • 3832476 • STM • (Rio Vizcachas, Rio Vizcanchas, Río Vizcachas, Río Vizcanchas) • (CL)
- Arroyo Guillermo • 51.21667°S 72.41667°W • 3892273 • STM • (Arroyo Guillermo, Rio Don Guillermo, Río Don Guillermo) • (AR)
- Río Chico • 53.68345°S 67.85665°W • 3895173 • STM • (Rio Carmen Silva, Rio Carmen Sylva, Rio Chico, Río Carmen Silva, Río Carmen Sylva, Río Chico) (AR)
- Río Trinidad • 49.41596°S 73.76604°W • 3869075 • STM
- Río Barranco • 50.71758°S 72.77306°W • 3898710 • STM • (Rio Barranco, Rio Barrancos, Río Barranco, Río Barrancos)
- Río Barroso • 50.72416°S 72.80117°W • 3898639 • STM
- Río Bandurria • 50.7351°S 72.41208°W • 3898838 • STM
- Río de los Caiquenes • 50.84781°S 72.96629°W • 3897401 • STM • (Rio de los Caiquenes, Rio los Colquenes, Río de los Caiquenes, Río los Colquenes)
- Río Zamora • 50.85029°S 72.69699°W • 3867579 • STM
- Río Baguales • 51.01683°S 72.50105°W • 3898995 • STM
- Río del Hielo • 51.09585°S 73.17821°W • 3888047 • STM
- Río de las Chinas • 51.24483°S 72.67687°W • 3895041 • STM
- Río Tres Pasos • 51.29072°S 72.67861°W • 3869168 • STM
- Arroyo Picana • 51.31349°S 72.60392°W • 3876339 • STM
- Río Serrano • 51.41343°S 73.08561°W • 3870984 • STM • (Rio Serrano, Río Serrano)

- Río Paine • 51.16565°S 72.94885°W • 3877733 • STM

- Asencio River

- Dickson River
- Río Geikie • 51.3151°S 73.27683°W • 3889041 • STM (Geike)
- Río de Grey • 51.18451°S 73.01582°W • 3888698 • STM
- Río Pingo • 51.08444°S 73.1777°W • 7303811 • STM
- Tyndall River

- Arroyo Prat • 51.48559°S 72.73768°W • 3875208 • STM
- Río Sofía • 51.50825°S 72.68834°W • 3870746 • STM
- Río Rivas • 51.53923°S 72.59778°W • 3873055 • STM
- Río Prat • 51.55617°S 72.73539°W • 3875198 • STM
- Río Boleadores • 51.66678°S 72.60129°W • 3898124 • STM • (Rio Boleadoras, Rio Boleadores, Río Boleadoras, Río Boleadores)
- Río Natales • 51.72169°S 72.50756°W • 3879001 • STM
- Río de las Casas Viejas • 51.84627°S 72.15529°W • 3896332 • STM
- Río Tranquilo • 51.89395°S 72.24466°W • 3869305 • STM
- Río Hollenberg • 51.90704°S 72.45352°W • 3887979 • STM • (Rio Hollemberg, Rio Hollenberg, Rio Hollomberg, Río Hollemberg, Río Hollenberg, Río Hollomberg)
- Chorrillo de los Alambres • 51.91021°S 72.19346°W • 3900304 • STM • (Chorrillo de los Alambres, Rio Chorrillo de los Alambres, Rio de los Alambres, Río Chorrillo de los Alambres, Río de los Alambres)
- Golondrina Río • 52.19964°S 72.49796°W • 3888943 • STM
- Río Vegas Malas • 52.2179°S 71.48119°W • 3868530 • STM
- Río de Los Pozuelos • 52.2248°S 70.25431°W • 3881494 • STM
- Río del Medio • 52.31258°S 71.57555°W • 3880158 • STM
- Chorrillo Meric • 52.34572°S 69.48966°W • 3880015 • STM • (Chorrillo Meric, Estero Merjo)
- Chorrillo La Leona • 52.4249°S 71.12054°W • 3885479 • STM • (Chorrillo La Leona, Chorrillo Las Lomas, Rio Las Lomas, Río Las Lomas)
- Chorrillo Wagner • 52.4553°S 71.23806°W • 3867949 • STM • (Chorrillo Wagner, Rio de la Jeannette, Río de la Jeannette)
- Chorrillo El Manzano • 52.50684°S 71.2082°W • 3891078 • STM • (Chorrillo El Manzano, Rio Malpaso, Rio Manzano, Río Malpaso, Río Manzano)
- Río Cuevas • 52.51667°S 73.48333°W • 3893101 • STM
- Río Pinto • 52.53565°S 72.19307°W • 3875869 • STM
- Río Haase • 52.55136°S 71.84219°W • 3888220 • STM • (Rio Haase, Rio Hass, Rio Husse, Rio de las Minas, Río Haase, Río Husse, Río de las Minas)
- Río Pérez • 52.5576°S 71.97209°W • 3876502 • STM
- Chorrillo El Salto • 52.5638°S 71.67769°W • 3890435 • STM • (Chorrillo El Salto, Rio El Salto, Río El Salto)
- Río Verde • 52.60774°S 71.50789°W • 3868409 • STM • (Rio Verde, Río Verde)
- Arroyo Virasoro • 52.63966°S 68.63789°W • 3868089 • STM
- Río Calafate • 52.64257°S 68.90404°W • 3897352 • STM
- Río Santa Susana • 52.6507°S 70.33392°W • 3871367 • STM
- Río Prat • 52.6694°S 72.00295°W • 3875197 • STM
- Cuarto Chorrillo • 52.67255°S 69.04683°W • 3893208 • STM • (Cuarto Chorrillo, Cuarto Chorrillos, Rio Cuarto, Río Cuarto)
- Río Side • 52.68262°S 69.18278°W • 3870928 • STM
- Río Vaquería • 52.68756°S 71.63792°W • 3868606 • STM
- Río Pantanos • 52.69667°S 69.13901°W • 3877289 • STM • (Rio Pantano, Rio Pantanos, Río Pantano, Río Pantanos)
- Río Palos • 52.69715°S 71.75752°W • 3877537 • STM
- Arroyo Las Minas • 52.69888°S 71.8532°W • 3884166 • STM
- Estero Valenzuela • 52.74091°S 71.43141°W • 3868683 • STM
- Río Oscar • 52.7831°S 69.80509°W • 3877960 • STM
- Estero Cortado • 52.80314°S 69.84995°W • 3893412 • STM • (Arroyo Cortado, Estero Cortado)
- Arroyo Rogers • 52.85085°S 69.94055°W • 3872938 • STM
- Estero Bellavista • 52.86905°S 69.35009°W • 3898463 • STM • (Estero Bellavista, Rio Bella Vista, Río Bella Vista)
- Río O’Higgins • 52.88423°S 69.41187°W • 3878159 • STM
- Río Pescado • 52.91718°S 70.89106°W • 3876446 • STM • (Rio Pescado, Rio Pezcado, Río Pescado, Río Pezcado)
- Estero Campanario • 52.93329°S 69.32757°W • 3897076 • STM • (Estero Campanario, Rio Campanario, Río Campanario)
- Río de los Patos • 52.9392°S 71.16643°W • 3876979 • STM • (Chorrillo Los Patos, Rio de los Patos, Rio los Palos, Río de los Patos, Río los Palos)
- Estero Pantanito • 52.98968°S 69.21288°W • 3877294 • STM
- Río Grande • 53.00424°S 71.86982°W • 3888772 • STM
- Estero Banco • 53.00465°S 69.68452°W • 3898857 • STM • (Chorrillo Banco, Estero Banco)
- Río Verde • 53.00547°S 70.1296°W • 3868408 • STM
- Estero La Mina Rica • 53.00882°S 71.25524°W • 3879826 • STM • (Chorrillo Mina Rica, Estero La Mina Rica, Estero Mina Rica, Rio Mina Rica, Río Mina Rica)
- Estero Moneda • 53.00982°S 69.68245°W • 3879515 • STM • (Chorrillo Moneda, Estero Moneda)
- Estero Chabunco • 53.0182°S 70.82298°W • 3895815 • STM • (Estero Chabunco, Rio Chabunco, Río Chabunco)
- Río de los Palos • 53.02377°S 70.16959°W • 3877535 • STM
- Chorrillo del Medio • 53.03035°S 71.26015°W • 3880198 • STM • (Chorrillo del Medio, Estero del Medio)
- Estero del Indio • 53.03333°S 71.93333°W • 3887256 • STM
- Chorrillo Corey • 53.03784°S 71.26711°W • 3893564 • STM • (Chorrillo Corey, Estero Corey)
- Estero Guanacos • 53.04013°S 69.72459°W • 3888466 • STM • (Chorrillo Guanacos, Estero Guanacos)
- Estero La Paz • 53.04542°S 69.83178°W • 3885062 • STM
- Arroyo de la Puerta • 53.05735°S 70.23695°W • 3875010 • STM • (Arroyo La Puerta, Arroyo de la Puerta)
- Estero Río Seco • 53.05808°S 70.85541°W • 3871051 • STM • (Estero Rio Seco, Estero Río Seco, Rio Seco, Río Seco)
- Estero Doce de Febrero • 53.06178°S 69.44783°W • 3892341 • STM
- Estero Tesoro • 53.0675°S 69.7598°W • 3869931 • STM
- Estero San Antonio • 53.08624°S 70.0899°W • 3872377 • STM
- Río Grande • 53.08961°S 71.33384°W • 3888771 • STM
- Estero Las Heras • 53.09385°S 69.51501°W • 3884330 • STM • (Estero La Heras, Estero Las Heras)
- Chorrillo Bitsh • 53.10178°S 70.8791°W • 3898371 • STM • (Chorrillo Bitsh, Estero Bistch, Estero Bitsh)
- Río Tres Puentes • 53.11484°S 70.87513°W • 3869153 • STM
- Estero Horquetas • 53.14046°S 69.77102°W • 3887834 • STM • (Chorrillo Horquetas, Estero Horquetas)
- Estero Carrera • 53.14215°S 69.56603°W • 3896530 • STM • (Estero Carrera, Estero Carreras)
- Estero Bueras • 53.14417°S 69.56506°W • 3897791 • STM
- Río El Canelo • 53.16278°S 71.53286°W • 3891765 • STM • (Canelo, Rio El Canelas, Rio El Canelo, Río El Canelas, Río El Canelo)
- Río de las Minas • 53.16345°S 70.89054°W • 3879808 • STM • (Rio Las Minas, Rio de las Minas, Río Las Minas, Río de las Minas)
- Río China • 53.16667°S 69.11667°W • 3895046 • STM
- Río de la Mano • 53.17074°S 70.93662°W • 3880692 • STM • (Rio La Mano, Rio de la Mano, Río La Mano, Río de la Mano)
- Río de los Ciervos • 53.20249°S 70.93571°W • 3894646 • STM • (Rio Los Ciervos, Rio de los Ciervos, Río Los Ciervos, Río de los Ciervos)
- Arroyo Onas • 53.20256°S 70.29588°W • 3878068 • STM • (Arroyo Ona, Arroyo Onas)
- Río La Caleta • 53.20342°S 71.62308°W • 3886394 • STM • (Rio La Caleta, Rio la Caleta, Río La Caleta, Río la Caleta)
- Estero Casa de Lata • 53.22668°S 70.30304°W • 3896396 • STM • (Arroyo Casa de Lata, Estero Casa de Lata)
- Río Leñadura • 53.2331°S 70.93839°W • 3883407 • STM • (Rio Lenadura, Rio Lenaduras, Río Leñadura, Río Leñaduras)
- Río Tres Brazos • 53.27192°S 70.9438°W • 3869228 • STM
- Río Porvenir • 53.29922°S 70.36834°W • 3875354 • STM
- Río Serrano • 53.32123°S 70.038°W • 3870983 • STM
- Estero Guairabo • 53.3223°S 70.93958°W • 3888580 • STM • (Chorrillo del Guairabo, Estero Guairabo)
- Estero Wickham • 53.32692°S 72.03047°W • 3867859 • STM
- Estero Pike • 53.33198°S 68.66941°W • 3876030 • STM
- Río Nuevo • 53.33215°S 69.39131°W • 3878443 • STM • (Rio Celmira, Rio Nuevo, Río Nuevo)
- Estero El Guanaco • 53.33475°S 68.76369°W • 3891300 • STM
- Río Centenario • 53.37531°S 69.34702°W • 3896001 • STM
- Río Discordia • 53.37594°S 69.84641°W • 3892391 • STM
- Río Santa María • 53.37748°S 70.98404°W • 3871465 • STM
- Río Concordia • 53.3821°S 69.90014°W • 3893853 • STM
- Estero Nacimiento • 53.38795°S 68.92377°W • 3879121 • STM • (Estero Nacimi, Estero Nacimiento)
- Río Valenzuela • 53.39585°S 69.96057°W • 3868676 • STM
- Río Santa María • 53.40192°S 70.3156°W • 3871464 • STM • (Rio Santa Maria, Rio de los Lavaderos, Río Santa María)
- Estero Egaña • 53.4022°S 68.62625°W • 3892064 • STM
- Río Agua Fresca • 53.40232°S 70.98475°W • 3900486 • STM • (Arroyo Agua Fresca, Rio Agua Fresca, Rio de Agua Fresco, Río Agua Fresca, Río de Agua Fresco)
- Río Pantanos • 53.41336°S 69.32453°W • 3877288 • STM • (Rio Pantano, Rio Pantanos, Río Pantanos)
- Río Esperanza • 53.44357°S 70.08416°W • 3889826 • STM
- Río Amarillo • 53.44623°S 70.9739°W • 3899796 • STM
- Río Rosario • 53.45797°S 70.1373°W • 3872803 • STM • (Rio Ossa, Rio Rosario, Río Rosario)
- Río Marazzi • 53.47828°S 69.30805°W • 3880545 • STM • (Rio Marazzi, Rio Odioso, Río Marazzi)
- Río Hondo • 53.52529°S 69.26702°W • 3887915 • STM
- Río Torcido • 53.52607°S 69.3623°W • 3869610 • STM
- Estero Thomson • 53.52898°S 68.94857°W • 3869902 • STM
- Estero San José • 53.54184°S 68.87342°W • 3872091 • STM
- Estero Esmeralda • 53.54423°S 68.70718°W • 3889891 • STM
- Estero Daly • 53.54876°S 68.69801°W • 3892752 • STM • (Estero Dale, Estero Daly)
- Río Pérez • 53.55544°S 68.80783°W • 3876501 • STM
- Estero del Padre • 53.55601°S 68.79791°W • 3877796 • STM
- Río Batchelor • 53.56039°S 72.30994°W • 3898610 • STM • (Rio Barchelot, Rio Batchelor, Rio de Massacre, Rio del Bachiller, Rio del Gran Valle, Río Batchelor)
- Río Bautista • 53.59582°S 69.56064°W • 3898583 • STM • (Rio Baustismo, Rio Bautismo, Rio Bautista, Río Baustismo, Río Bautismo, Río Bautista)
- Río MacKlelland • 53.63562°S 69.64982°W • 3881076 • STM • (Rio MacClelland, Rio MacKlelland, Río MacClelland, Río MacKlelland)
- Río San Juan • 53.64991°S 70.94242°W • 3872007 • STM • (Rio Grave, Rio San Juan, Río San Juan)
- Río Nogueira • 53.65817°S 69.73274°W • 3878571 • STM • (Rio Ner, Rio Nogueira, Río Ner, Río Nogueira)
- Río Green • 53.66667°S 69.8°W • 3888712 • STM
- Río Ana • 53.66703°S 69.78298°W • 3899755 • STM
- Río San Bernabé • 53.68496°S 71.87629°W • 3872350 • STM
- Río Moritz • 53.687°S 69.91919°W • 3879331 • STM • (Rio Green, Rio Moritz, Río Green, Río Moritz)
- Río Blanco • 53.68801°S 69.91919°W • 3898193 • STM
- Río Chegneaux • 53.70516°S 69.29842°W • 3895300 • STM
- Río Navarro • 53.70518°S 69.30129°W • 3878982 • STM • (Estero Navarro, Rio Navarro, Río Navarro)
- Río Woodsend • 53.72146°S 69.98655°W • 3867796 • STM
- Estero Huáscar • 53.75488°S 68.79772°W • 3887760 • STM • (Chorrillo Huascar, Chorrillo Huáscar, Estero Huascar, Estero Huáscar)
- Río Munizaga • 53.77044°S 69.03727°W • 3879177 • STM
- Estero Evans • 53.78197°S 69.01614°W • 3889674 • STM • (Estero Evans, Rio Evans, Río Evans)
- Estero Wilson • 53.79855°S 68.77288°W • 3867820 • STM
- Río San José • 53.80643°S 71.62958°W • 3872086 • STM
- Río Zapata • 53.81667°S 69.4°W • 3867529 • STM
- Río Donoso • 53.81667°S 69.31667°W • 3892253 • STM • (Rio Donosa, Rio Donoso, Río Donosa, Río Donoso) • (CL)
- Río Gennes • 53.83107°S 71.11045°W • 3889014 • STM • (Rio De Gennes, Rio Gennes, Río De Gennes, Río Gennes)
- Río Oro • 53.8449°S 71.44157°W • 3877986 • STM
- Río Japón • 53.84777°S 69.25824°W • 3886969 • STM
- Río Rusphen • 53.84891°S 69.23149°W • 3872673 • STM • (Rio Ausphen, Rio Rusphen, Río Ausphen, Río Rusphen)
- Estero Ganchos • 53.85814°S 69.09082°W • 3889139 • STM
- Río Fox • 53.87676°S 70.45306°W • 3889374 • STM
- Río Latorre • 53.88333°S 69.48333°W • 3883688 • STM
- Río Riveros • 53.90966°S 69.09332°W • 3873040 • STM
- Río Cochrane • 53.914°S 68.71836°W • 3894475 • STM
- Río Blanco • 53.9291°S 68.97297°W • 3898192 • STM
- Río Santa Ludgarda • 53.94138°S 70.84626°W • 3871489 • STM
- Río Grande • 53.97507°S 70.09909°W • 3888770 • STM
- Río Paralelo • 54.22134°S 69.64266°W • 3877209 • STM
- Río de Veer • 54.44679°S 68.96326°W • 3868550 • STM
- Río Azopardo • 54.47446°S 68.96641°W • 3899060 • STM • (Rio Azopardo, Rio Leopardo, Río Azopardo, Río Leopardo)
- Río Mascarello • 54.48204°S 68.93215°W • 3880392 • STM
- Río Fontaine • 54.4828°S 68.98758°W • 3889407 • STM
- Río Betbeder • 54.53116°S 68.76745°W • 3898398 • STM
- Río Roca • 54.73972°S 68.72173°W • 3872995 • STM
- Canal Unión • 54.74167°S 71.80833°W • 3950112 • CHN
- Río Lapataia • 54.77181°S 68.7059°W • 3885068 • STM
- Rio Uquika • 54.92917°S 67.59722°W • 3965622 • STM
- Canal Thomson • 54.93333°S 70.2°W • 3950095 • CHN
- Río Douglas • 55.19127°S 68.01264°W • 3892201 • STM
- Yendegaia River

== See also ==
- List of lakes in Chile
- List of volcanoes in Chile
- List of islands of Chile
- List of fjords, channels, sounds and straits of Chile
- List of lighthouses in Chile
