= Tyndall (disambiguation) =

Tyndall is the name of an English family taken from the land they held as tenants in chief of the Kings of England and Scotland in the 11th, 12th and 13th centuries.

Tyndall may also refer to:

== People ==
- Arthur Tyndall (1891–1979), New Zealand civil engineer, public servant and judge
- Arthur Mannering Tyndall (1881–1961), English physicist
- Charles Tyndall (1900–1971), Anglican Bishop of Kilmore, Elphin and Ardagh
- Denis Tyndall (1890–1965), Anglican priest
- Edward Tyndall (born 1973), director of the 2012 documentary Reconvergence
- Emily Tyndall, a stage name of Emily Dunn (actress)
- George Tyndall (1946 or 1947–2023), American gynecologist investigated for multiple instances of alleged sexual abuse
- Humphrey Tyndall (1549–1614), English Anglican, churchman, President of Queens' College, Cambridge, Archdeacon of Stafford, Chancellor of Lichfield Cathedral and Dean of Ely
- John Tyndall (1820–1893), Irish physicist
- John Tyndall (poet) (born 1951), Canadian poet
- John Tyndall (politician) (1934–2005), English far-right politician
- Kate Tyndall (born 1983), Australian rules footballer
- Louisa Charlotte Tyndall (1845–1940), wife and assistant of the physicist John Tyndall
- Robert Tyndall (1877–1947), United States Army major general and mayor of Indianapolis
- Robert Tyndall (surveyor) (fl. 1608), English mariner and surveyor involved in Virginia Colony
- Thomas Tyndall (1723–1794), English merchant and banker
- William Tyndale (c. 1494–1536), also spelled Tyndall, English biblical scholar and linguist
- William T. Tyndall (1862–1928), American politician
- William Tyndall (MP), Member of Parliament for Bristol (UK Parliament constituency) in 1558

== Places ==
- Tyndall, Manitoba, Canada, where Tyndall stone is quarried
- Tyndall, South Dakota, United States, a city
- Tyndall Air Force Base, near Panama City, Florida, United States
- Tyndall Branch (Deep Creek tributary), Delaware, United States
- Tyndall Glacier (disambiguation)
- Tyndall River, Chile
- Mount Tyndall, California, United States
- Mount Tyndall (Tasmania), Australia
- Pic Tyndall, a minor summit below the Matterhorn between Italy and Switzerland
- Tyndall Mountains, Graham Land, Antarctica
- Tyndall (lunar crater)
- Tyndall (Martian crater)

== Science and technology ==
- Tyndall National Institute, a European hardware research centre located in Cork, Ireland
- John Tyndall Award, awarded to individuals who contribute to fiber optics technology

== See also ==
- Tyndall effect
- Tindal (disambiguation)
- Tyndale (disambiguation)
