= Tyndale (disambiguation) =

William Tyndale (c. 1494 – 1536) was a 16th-century Protestant reformer and Bible translator.

Tynedale, was a local government district in south-west Northumberland, England between 1974 and 2009.

Tyndale or Tynedale may also refer to:

== People with the surname ==
- George Tyndale (1913–1991), Jamaican musician
- Hector Tyndale (1821–1880), American military officer
- John Tyndale (died 1413), English politician
- Mark Tyndale (born 1986), American basketball player
- Mary Tindale (1920–2011), Australian botanist
- Orville Sievwright Tyndale (1887–1952), Canadian judge
- Robert Tyndale (fl. 1417–1419), English politician
- Sharon Tyndale (1816–1871), American politician
- Thomas Tyndale (1528/33–1571), English politician
- Walter Tyndale (1855–1943), English painter
- William Tyndale (c. 1494 – 1536) was a 16th-century Protestant reformer and Bible translator.

== Religion ==
- Tyndale Baptist Church, church in Bristol, England
- Tyndale Bible, Bible translated by William Tyndale
- Tyndale House, Christian publishing company

== Educational institutions ==
- Tyndale Academy, a defunct school in London, England
- Tyndale Christian School (disambiguation), several schools
- Tyndale House (Cambridge), a biblical studies centre in Cambridge, England
- Tyndale Theological Seminary, Christian seminary and Bible institute in Fort Worth, Texas
- Tyndale Theological Seminary (Europe), a Christian seminary in the Netherlands
- Tyndale University College and Seminary, school in Toronto, Ontario
- William Tyndale College, a Christian college in Michigan
- William Tyndale Junior School, in Islington, London, England

== Places ==
- Tyndale, New South Wales, a locality in Australia

== See also ==
- Tindal (disambiguation) for Tindal, Tindale and Tindall
- Tyndall (disambiguation)
