= Tindal =

Tindal, Tindale or Tindall may refer to:

== People ==
- Adela Tindal (1862–1929), British composer, more usually known as Adela Maddison
- Bill Tindall (1925–1995), American aerospace engineer, NASA engineer and manager
- Blair Tindall (born 1960), American oboist and journalist
- George Tindall (1921–2006), American historian
- Gillian Tindall (born 1938), British author
- Mardi Tindal (born 1952), Canadian divine
- Mary Tindale (1920–2011), Australian botanist
- Matthew Tindal (1657–1733), English writer
- Mike Tindall (born 1978), English rugby player
- Mike Tindall (footballer) (1941–2020), English football player
- Nicolas Tindal (1687–1774), English translator and historian, nephew of Matthew
- Norman Tindale (1900–1993), Australian anthropologist, archaeologist and entomologist
- Nicholas Conyngham Tindal (1776–1846), English Lord Chief Justice of the Common Pleas, great grandson of Nicolas
- Patricia Randall Tindale (1926–2011), English architect and civil servant
- T. J. Tindall (1950–2016), American guitarist
- William Tindal (1756–1804), English antiquary
- William York Tindall (1903–1981), American James Joyce scholar
- Zara Tindall (born 1981), British royal and equestrian, otherwise known as Zara Phillips

== Places ==
- RAAF Base Tindal, a Royal Australian Air Force base near Katherine, Northern Territory
- Tindale, Cumbria, England, United Kingdom
- Tindall, Missouri, United States
- Tindal, Northern Territory, Australia
- Tindall, Virginia, United States

== Other uses ==
- Acetophenazine
- Tindal Centre, a defunct psychiatric hospital in Buckinghamshire, England
- Tindal Street Press, a British publisher
- The boatswain's mate or second most senior engine room petty officer in a lascar ship's crew

== See also ==
- Tyndale (disambiguation), for Tyndale, Tyndall and Tynedale
- Tyndall (disambiguation)
