= San Bernabé =

San Bernabé (English: Saint Bernabé) is a Spanish name for Barnabas, a prominent early Christian. It may also refer to:

== Geography ==
- San Bernabe AVA, California, an American Viticultural Area
- San Bernabé, a settlement of indigenous Mexicaneros in Mezquital Municipality, Mexico
- San Bernabé (river), Spain - see Rivers of Galicia
- San Bernabé, a river in Chile - see List of rivers of Chile (P–Z)
- Bahía de San Bernabé, former name of a bay near San José del Cabo, Mexico
- San Bernabé, part of Tayasal (archaeological site) in Guatemala
- San Bernabé, Bilbao, Spain, a geological fold within the city

== Churches ==
- Church of San Bernabé (El Escorial), Spain
- Church of San Bernabé, Valdenuño Fernández, Spain
- Church of San Bernabé, Amaxac de Guerrero, Mexico

== Other uses ==
- San Bernabé metro station, Monterrey, Mexico
- San Bernabé, flagship of Martín de Bertendona during the 1591 Battle of Flores
- San Bernabé, a ship of the Spanish Armada (1588) - see List of ships of the Spanish Armada
- San Bernabé, Zacatecas, Mexico, a 16th century silver mine

== See also ==
- 1641 Caracas earthquake, also known as the San Bernabé earthquake because it occurred on the feast day of Barnabas
