= Toconce River =

- Loa and its affluents San Pedro, Silala, Toconce and Salado Rivers

Location
- Country: Chile

The Toconce River is a river of Chile.

== See also ==
- List of rivers of Chile
