= List of rivers of the Arica y Parinacota Region =

The information regarding List of rivers in the Arica y Parinacota Region on this page has been compiled from the data supplied by GeoNames. It includes all features named "Rio", "Canal", "Arroyo", "Estero" and those Feature Code is associated with a stream of water. (Note: The arbitrarily selected codes are RPDS, CHN, CNLA, CNLB, CNLD, CNLI, CNLN, CNLSB, CRKT, DTCH, DTCHI, DTCHD, ESTY, FORD, SBED, STM, STMA, STMB, STMC, STMD, STMH, STMI, STMIX, STMM, STMQ, STMS, STMSB, STMX, TNLC, WTRC, WTRH) This list contains 34 water streams.

== Content ==
This list contains:

1. Name of the stream, in Spanish language
2. Coordinates are latitude and longitude of the feature in ± decimal degrees, at the mouth of the stream
3. Link to a map including the Geonameid (a number which uniquely identifies a Geoname feature)
4. Feature Code explained in
5. Other names for the same feature, if any
6. Basin countries additional to Chile, if any

== List ==
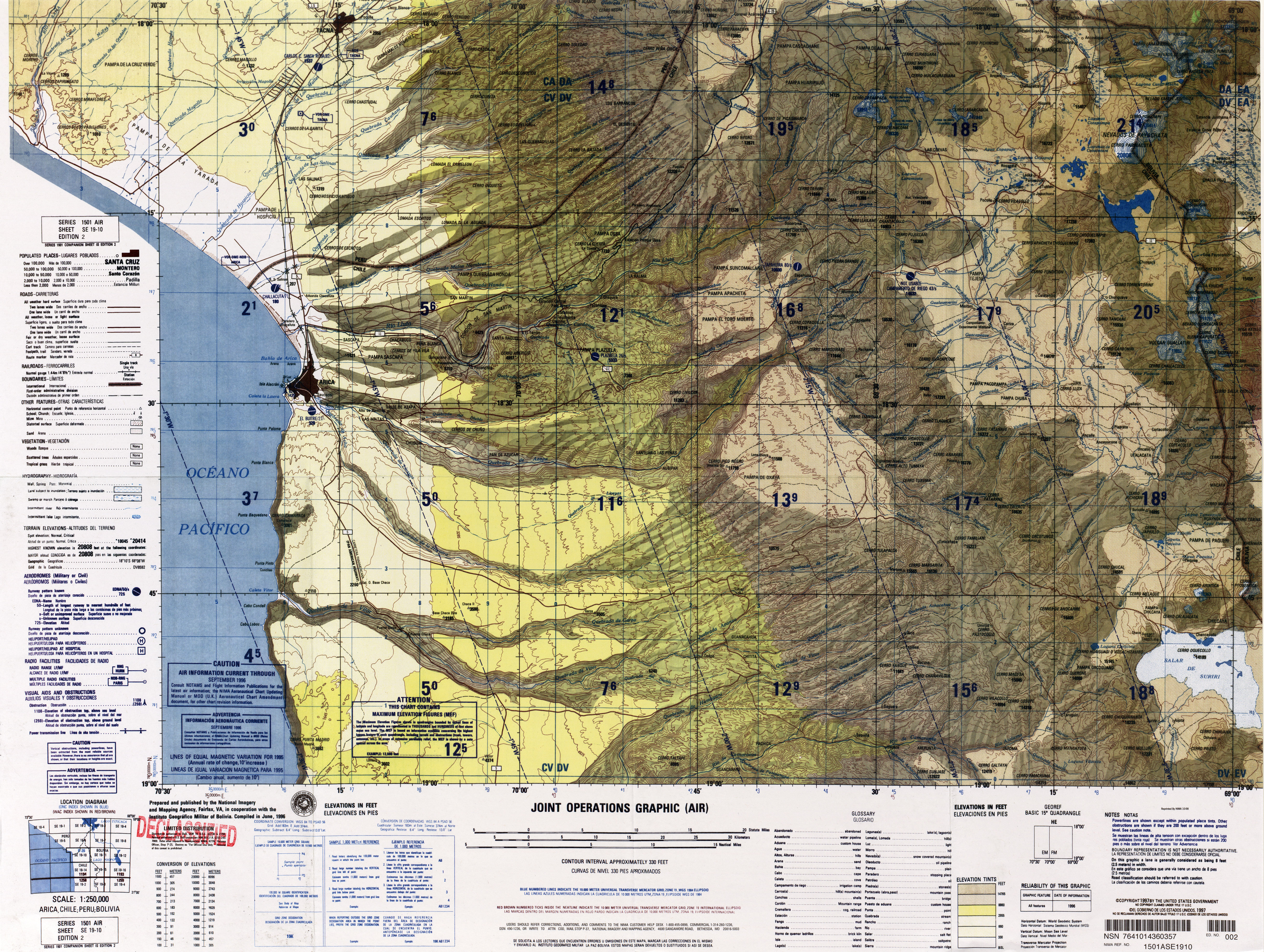
Arica y Parinacota Region

Rivers of the Arica and Parinacota Region

Loa, San Pedro, Silala and Salado Rivers Basins

- Río Uchusuma • 17.6°S 69.43333°W • 3926636 • STMI • (PE, BL)
- Río Chislluma • 17.72164°S 69.68645°W • 3894959 • STMI
- Río Azufre • 17.83879°S 69.70713°W • 3899050 • STMI
- Río Caracarani • 17.92467°S 69.62031°W • 3896809 • STMI • (Quebrada Caracarani, Quebrada Caracharani, Rio Caracarani, Río Caracarani)
- Río Caquena • 17.94306°S 69.29772°W • 3896817 • STM

- Río Condorire • 18.03114°S 69.21241°W • 3893800 • STM

- Río Guailas • 18.05108°S 69.69272°W • 3888601 • STMI • (Quebrada Guailas, Rio Guaylas)
- Río Cosapilla • 18.06667°S 69.26667°W • 3893395 • STMI • (BL)
- Río Ancoma • 18.1881°S 69.56105°W • 3899704 • STM
- Río Jurase • 18.20652°S 69.53393°W • 3886670 • STM
- Río Blanco • 18.32644°S 69.4661°W • 3898219 • STM
- Río Lauca • 19.16667°S 68.16667°W • 3883639 • STM • (Rio Lauca, Río Lauca) • (BO)

- Río Chusjavida • 18.57142°S 69.16196°W • 3894666 • STM
- Río Paquisa • 18.59269°S 69.1138°W • 3877232 • STM
- Río Vizcachani • 18.37604°S 69.35113°W • 3868019 • STM
- Río Challoani • 18.20469°S 69.31155°W • 3895598 • STM

- Río Lluta • 18.4138°S 70.32399°W • 3882827 • STM • (Rio Lluta, Río Lluta)
- Río Seco • 18.43373°S 69.62526°W • 3871050 • STMI
- Río Blanco • 18.46667°S 69.25°W • 3898239 • STMI • (Arroyo Blanco, Estero Blanco, Rio Blanco, Río Blanco)
- Río San José • 18.46854°S 70.31241°W • 3872085 • STMI

- Canal Lauca • 18.36445°S 69.54043°W • 3883641 • CNLI (from Rio Lauca)
- Río Tignamar • 18.43532°S 69.61611°W • 3869863 • STMI • (Quebrada de Tianamar, Rio Tignamar, Río Tignamar)

- Río Quiburcanca • 18.58333°S 69.11667°W • 3874302 • STMI
- Río Guaiguasi • 18.70492°S 69.11952°W • 3888605 • STM
- Estero Veco • 18.82357°S 69.29001°W • 3868554 • STMI
- Río Blanco • 18.83797°S 69.07294°W • 3898191 • STMI
- Río Janure • 18.84929°S 69.24454°W • 3886972 • STMI • (Arroyo Janure, Estero Janure, Rio Janure, Río Janure)
- Estero Utalacata • 18.85883°S 69.2499°W • 3868750 • STMI
- Río Surire • 18.87203°S 69.06223°W • 3870427 • STM
- Río Jaruma • 18.88722°S 69.25999°W • 3886934 • STMI • (Rio Jarama, Rio Jaruma, Río Jarama, Río Jaruma)
- Río Pailcoaillo • 18.89228°S 69.25584°W • 3877756 • STMI
- Río Taruguire • 18.91111°S 69.26314°W • 3870100 • STM
- Río Blanco • 18.92766°S 69.2758°W • 3898190 • STMI
- Río Chuquiananta • 18.93896°S 69.23101°W • 3894690 • STMI • (Arroyo Chuquiananta, Estero Chuquiananta, Rio Chuquiananta, Río Chuquiananta)
- Río Camarones • 19.19334°S 70.26863°W • 3897158 • STM • (Camarones Gully, Quebrada Camarones, Quebrada de Camarones, Rio Camarones, Río Camarones)

- Río Ajatama • 18.94752°S 69.41853°W • 3900322 • STMI

- Río Macusa • 18.88745°S 69.26025°W • 3881062 • STM
- Río Caritaya • 18.94782°S 69.41879°W • 3896647 • STMI
- Río Blanco • 19.84904°S 68.6631°W • 3898218 • STM

== See also ==
- List of lakes in Chile
- List of volcanoes in Chile
- List of islands of Chile
- List of fjords, channels, sounds and straits of Chile
- List of lighthouses in Chile
