= Dickson River =

Location
- Country: Chile

Physical characteristics
- Mouth: Lake Paine
  - coordinates: 50°51′20″S 72°57′43″W

The Dickson River is a river of Chile.

== See also ==
- List of rivers of Chile
