= Colorado River (Lontué) =

Location
- Country: Chile

The Colorado River is a river in Chile.

== See also ==
- List of rivers of Chile
