= List of rivers of the Tarapacá Region =

The information regarding List of rivers in the Tarapacá Region on this page has been compiled from the data supplied by GeoNames. It includes all features named "Rio", "Canal", "Arroyo", "Estero" and those Feature Code is associated with a stream of water. (Note: The arbitrarily selected codes are RPDS, CHN, CNLA, CNLB, CNLD, CNLI, CNLN, CNLSB, CRKT, DTCH, DTCHI, DTCHD, ESTY, FORD, SBED, STM, STMA, STMB, STMC, STMD, STMH, STMI, STMIX, STMM, STMQ, STMS, STMSB, STMX, TNLC, WTRC, WTRH) This list contains 44 water streams.

== Content ==
This list contains:

1. Name of the stream, in Spanish Language
2. Coordinates are latitude and longitude of the feature in ± decimal degrees, at the mouth of the stream
3. Link to a map including the Geonameid (a number which uniquely identifies a Geoname feature)
4. Feature Code explained in
5. Other names for the same feature, if any
6. Basin countries additional to Chile, if any

== List ==
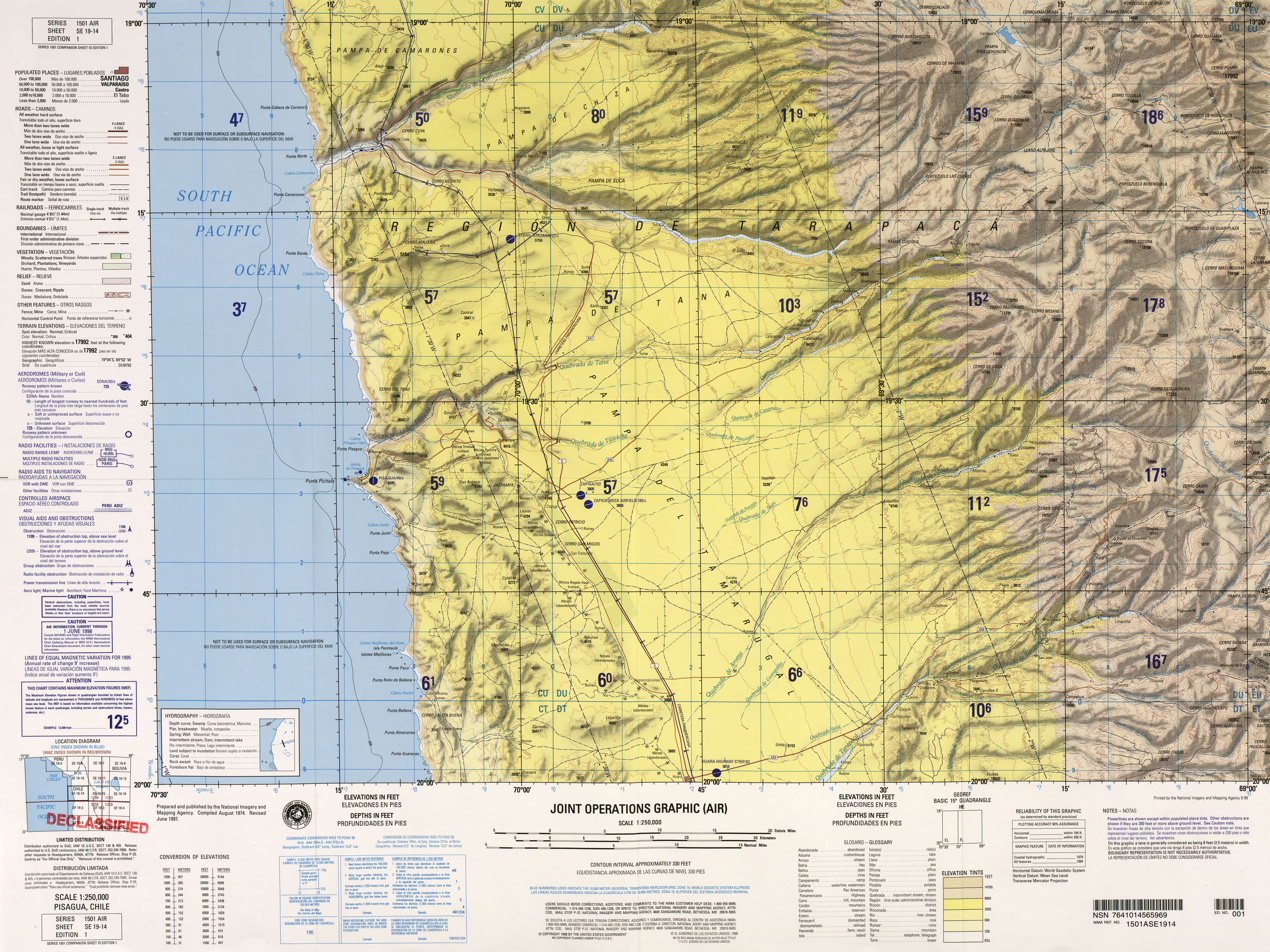
North of the Tarapacá Region

Loa, San Pedro, Silala and Salado Rivers Basins

- Río Loa • 21.42996°S 70.05874°W • 3882821 • STM
- Río Todos Santos • 19.00542°S 68.6913°W • 3869706 • STM
- Arroyo de Veco • 19.05574°S 69.24834°W • 3868555 • STMI
- Arroyo Sencata • 19.06488°S 68.87456°W • 3871028 • STM
- Río Guaiguasi • 19.06712°S 69.1681°W • 3888606 • STMI • (Quebrada Guaiguasi, Rio Guaiguasi, Río Guaiguasi)
- Río Mulluri • 19.07371°S 69.17867°W • 3879192 • STMI • (Arroyo de Mulluri, Estero Mulluri, Quebrada de Mulluri, Rio Mulluri, Río Mulluri)
- Río Caico • 19.10006°S 69.12078°W • 3897428 • STMI • (Arroyo de Caico, Quebrada Caico, Quebrada Cajco, Rio Caico, Río Caico)
- Río Cubanaya • 19.12067°S 69.5269°W • 3893193 • STMI • (Arroyo de Cubanaya, Arroyo de Cubayana, Quebrada Cuanalla, Quebrada Cubanalla, Quebrada de Cubanaya, Rio Cubanalla, Río Cubanaya)
- Arroyo de Cotase • 19.18333°S 69.2°W • 3893366 • STMI
- Río Camarones • 19.19334°S 70.26863°W • 3897158 • STM • (Camarones Gully, Quebrada Camarones, Quebrada de Camarones, Rio Camarones, Río Camarones)

- Río Ajatama • 18.94752°S 69.41853°W • 3900322 • STMI

- Río Macusa • 18.88745°S 69.26025°W • 3881062 • STM
- Río Caritaya • 18.94782°S 69.41879°W • 3896647 • STMI
- Río Blanco • 19.84904°S 68.6631°W • 3898218 • STM

- Río Huinchuta • 19.19861°S 68.91625°W • 3887503 • STMI • (Arroyo Huinchula, Arroyo Huinchuta, Estero Huinchala, Rio Huenchuta, Río Huinchuta)
- Río Chaguane • 19.1993°S 68.91652°W • 3895675 • STMI • (Manantial de Chaguane, Rio Chaguane, Río Chaguane)
- Arroyo Pasijiro • 19.21667°S 68.91667°W • 3877105 • STMI
- Río Chagua • 19.21667°S 68.96667°W • 3895684 • STMI
- Arroyo Chaguane • 19.2°S 68.93333°W • 3895676 • STMI
- Río Llanquipa • 19.24822°S 69.01506°W • 3882951 • STMI • (Arroyo de Llanguipa, Estero Llanquipa, Quebrada de Llanquipa, Rio Llanquipa, Río Llanquipa)
- Quebrada Colca • 19.24937°S 69.00322°W • 3894316 • STM • (Arroyo de Colca, Quebrada Colca, Rio Colca, Río Colca)
- Río Arabilla • 19.25584°S 68.7192°W • 3899476 • STMI
- Río Isluga • 19.2788°S 68.65909°W • 3887048 • STMI
- Río Sitani • 19.28176°S 68.62394°W • 3870817 • STMI
- Río Cariquima • 19.32728°S 68.55058°W • 3896651 • STMI
- Estero Puchultisa • 19.38797°S 69.00566°W • 3875083 • STM
- Estero Montecarabe • 19.4152°S 68.60544°W • 3879464 • STMI
- Río Grande • 19.4529°S 68.64068°W • 3888781 • STM
- Río Queñuvuta • 19.46638°S 68.7117°W • 3874369 • STMI • (Arroyo de Quenuvuta, Arroyo de Queñuvuta, Quebrada Challavilque, Rio Queñuvuta, Río Queñuvuta, Río Chacavilque)
- Río Tana • 19.50388°S 70.06896°W • 3870176 • STMI • (Quebrada de Camina, Quebrada de Camiña, Quebrada de Tana, Rio Camiña, Río Camiña, Rio Tana, Río Tana)
- Arroyo Toroni • 19.52842°S 68.75059°W • 3869531 • STMI
- Arroyo Guaitani • 19.5°S 68.63333°W • 3888574 • STMI • (Arroyo Guaitani, Arroyo Huaitani, Estero Guaitani, Río Guaitani) • (CL)
- Arroyo Colchane • 19.69506°S 68.89749°W • 3894307 • STMI
- Río Calajualla • 19.71585°S 69.00217°W • 3897348 • STM
- Arroyo Tucuruma • 19.83587°S 68.84773°W • 3868974 • STMI
- Estero Jornune • 19.84748°S 68.90653°W • 3886842 • STM
- Estero Charvinto • 19.84787°S 68.90593°W • 3895360 • STM
- Río de Ocacucho • 19.85969°S 68.59078°W • 3878386 • STMI
- Estero Lupe Chico • 19.88578°S 68.68724°W • 3881157 • STMI • (Arroyo Lupe Chico, Río Lupe Chico, Estero Lupe Chico, Quebrada Lupe Chico)
- Río Chancacoya • 19.88606°S 68.96495°W • 3895520 • STM
- Arroyo Lupe Grande • 19.89443°S 68.66279°W • 3881155 • STMI • (Arroyo Lupe Grande, Estero Lupe Grande, Quebrada Lupe Grande, Río Lupe Grande)
- Quebrada de Aroma • 19.98431°S 69.75101°W • 3899323 • STMI • (Arroyo Aroma, Estero Aroma, Quebrada de Aroma, Rio Aroma, Río Aroma)
- Río Piga • 20.03246°S 68.82216°W • 3876043 • STMI

- Río de Collacagua • 20.28543°S 68.84055°W • 3894226 • STMI • (Rio de Collacagua, Rio de Collacugua, Río de Collacagua)

== See also ==
- List of lakes in Chile
- List of volcanoes in Chile
- List of islands of Chile
- List of fjords, channels, sounds and straits of Chile
- List of lighthouses in Chile
