= Geike River =

Location
- Country: Chile

The Geike River is a river of Chile. It originates in the glacier of the same name.

== See also ==
- List of rivers of Chile
