= Pingo River =

Location
- Country: Chile

Physical characteristics
- Mouth: Grey River
  - coordinates: 51°07′06″S 73°07′17″W

The Pingo River is a river of Chile.

== See also ==
- List of rivers of Chile
