= Río Chico (Chile) =

Chico River

Location
- Country: Chile

Río Chico (Spanish for "small river") is a river of Chile.

== See also ==
- List of rivers of Chile
