= Pinotalca River =

Location
- Country: Chile

Physical characteristics
- Mouth: Pacific Ocean
  - coordinates: 35°33′42″S 72°37′07″W

The Pinotalca River is a river of Chile.

== See also ==
- List of rivers of Chile
