= Tyndale Christian School =

Several schools are named Tyndale Christian School. They include:

- Tyndale Christian School (Arlington, Virginia) The United States of America
- Tyndale Christian School (New South Wales) in Blacktown, New South Wales, Australia
- Tyndale Christian School (South Australia) in Salisbury East, South Australia, Australia
- Tyndale Christian School, Murray Bridge, South Australia
- Tyndale Christian School, Strathalbyn, South Australia
- Tyndale Christian School (Calgary) in Calgary Alberta, Canada
