= Tyndale Academy =

Location
- Forest Gate; London, E7 8DX; England; 51.5446°N 0.0372°E

Information
- Type: Private school
- Religious affiliation: Christian
- Established: 1999
- Gender: Coeducational
- Age: 4 to 11

Tyndale Academy was an independent, fee-paying tuition group in East London for children aged 4 to 11 years of age. The academy, based at the Hope Baptist Chapel had an evangelical Christian ethos but accepted children from all faiths or none. It was established in 1999 and was named after the English church reformer William Tyndale who as well as being a Bible translator was a tutor of children.

== Corporal punishment ==
During its operation Tyndale Academy was one of a very small number of educational settings in the United Kingdom that still condoned corporal punishment as part of its sanctions policy. Although corporal punishment was banned in the United Kingdom schools, Tyndale Academy was able to continue the practise legally as pupils only attended on a part-time basis. As institutions whose pupils attend for less than 21 hours per week do not fall under the legal definition of a school, they are unaffected by the law preventing the use of corporal punishment.

This practice caused controversy in 2008 when the government discussed proposals in the Education and Skills Bill 2007 which would embrace Tyndale Academy as an independent educational institution and so render its discipline policy illegal.

== After the 2008 Education and Skills Bill ==
Following the passing into law of the Education and Skills Bill (2008) Tyndale continued to operate. Over a year after the enactment of the Bill, the DCSF had not undertaken the consultation process which would establish the regulatory framework defining Independent Educational Institutions. This has theoretically meant that it has been possible for Tyndale to continue without any substantive changes to its provision. Draft versions of the Regulations state that the Department is minded to count breaktimes, assemblies and lunch hours as "time during which education is provided". This would break with the criteria that is strictly applied to all state run and independent schools. The Department for Children Schools and Families held 11 box files of material on Tyndale the bulk of which it refused to release, arguing legal and ministerial exemptions..

An in depth interview with Ferris Lindsay, Tyndale's proprietor, took place in the Times Educational Supplement on 20 November 2009. In it, his views on corporal punishment and the more broader matters of what motivated him in establishing Tyndale are discussed.
