= Tyndall River =

River in Chile

Location
- Country: Chile

The Tyndall River is a river of Chile.

== See also ==
- List of rivers of Chile
