= Tyndall Glacier =

Tyndall Glacier may refer to:

- Tyndall Glacier (Chile)
- Tyndall Glacier (Colorado), a glacier in Rocky Mountain National Park, Colorado USA
- Tyndall Glacier (Alaska)
- Tyndall Glacier (New Zealand)
- Tyndall Glacier (Mount Kenya)
