= List of rivers of the Antofagasta Region =

The information regarding List of rivers in the Antofagasta Region on this page has been compiled from the data supplied by GeoNames. It includes all features named "Rio", "Canal", "Arroyo", "Estero" and those Feature Code is associated with a stream of water. (Note: The arbitrarily selected codes are RPDS, CHN, CNLA, CNLB, CNLD, CNLI, CNLN, CNLSB, CRKT, DTCH, DTCHI, DTCHD, ESTY, FORD, SBED, STM, STMA, STMB, STMC, STMD, STMH, STMI, STMIX, STMM, STMQ, STMS, STMSB, STMX, TNLC, WTRC, WTRH) This list contains 41 water streams.

== Content ==
This list contains:

1. Name of the stream, in Spanish Language
2. Coordinates are latitude and longitude of the feature in ± decimal degrees, at the mouth of the stream
3. Link to a map including the Geonameid (a number which uniquely identifies a Geoname feature)
4. Feature Code explained in
5. Other names for the same feature, if any
6. Basin countries additional to Chile, if any

== List ==
Loa, San Pedro, Silala and Salado Rivers Basins

- Río Loa • 21.42996°S 70.05874°W • 3882821 • STM

- Río Chela • 21.44037°S 68.683°W • 3895293 • STM • (Arroyo de Chela, Estero Chela, Quebrada Chela, Rio Chela, Río Chela)
- Río Blanco • 21.26463°S 68.68756°W • 3873147 • STMI • (Quebrada Rio Blanco, Quebrada Río Blanco, Rio Blanco, Río Blanco)
- Río San Pedro • 21.96551°S 68.60642°W • 3871793 • STM

- Río Silala • 22.03333°S 68.1°W • 3904306 • Rio Siloli • (BL)

- Río San Salvador • 22.39639°S 69.52772°W • 3871709 • STM • (Rio San Salvador, Río San Salvador)
- Río Salado • 22.37099°S 68.65496°W • 3872603 • STM • (Rio Salado, Río Salado)

- Río Toconce • 22.27943°S 68.21281°W • 3869720 • STMI

- Arroyo Paco-Paco • 21.22162°S 68.67679°W • 3877807 • STM • (Arroyo Paco-Paco, Estero Pacopaco)
- Río Seco • 21.97808°S 69.57999°W • 3873102 • STMI
- Río Colana • 21.98333°S 68.25°W • 3894320 • STMI • (Quebrada de Colana, Rio Colana) • (CL)
- Río Hojalar • 22.26909°S 68.19764°W • 3887987 • STMI • (Rio Hojal, Rio Hojalar, Río Hojal, Río Hojalar)
- Río Caspana • 22.27673°S 68.26079°W • 3896272 • STMI
- Arroyo Chilcal • 22.28333°S 68.25°W • 3895132 • STMI • (Arroyo Chilcal, Quebrada Chilcal, Quebrada Chileal, Rio Chilcal, Río Chilcal) • (CL)
- Río Piedras Grandes • 22.29583°S 68.11126°W • 3876062 • STMI
- Arroyo Yusto • 22.29675°S 68.11153°W • 3867598 • STMI
- Río Curte • 22.30435°S 68.22141°W • 3892829 • STMI
- Río Tulicune • 22.30456°S 68.22195°W • 3868951 • STMI
- Quebrada Huiculunche • 22.3°S 68.51667°W • 3887564 • STMI • (Arroyo Huiculunche, Quebrada Huicouluncha, Quebrada Huiculuncha, Quebrada Huiculunche, Rio Huiculuncha, Río Huiculunche) • (CL)
- Río Incaguasi • 22.36087°S 68.37925°W • 3887280 • STMI • (Rio Incaguasi, Rio Incahuasi, Rio Incaquas, Río Incaguasi, Río Incahuasi)
- Arroyo Coyo • 22.39458°S 68.12933°W • 3893317 • STMI
- Arroyo Ojos de Agua de Putana • 22.51667°S 67.46667°W • 3878123 • STMI • (Arroyo Ojos de Agua de Putana, Arroyo Ojos de Putana) • (CL)
- Arroyo Aguas Blancas • 22.52378°S 68.00849°W • 3900439 • STMI • (Arroyo Aguas Blancas, Arroyo Aquas Blancas)
- Arroyo de Jauna • 22.62225°S 68.12828°W • 3886925 • STMI • (Arroyo de Jana, Arroyo de Jauna)
- Río Machuca • 22.62268°S 68.12807°W • 3881084 • STMI
- Río Puripica • 22.7689°S 68.07542°W • 3874589 • STMI
- Río Salado • 22.80401°S 68.20008°W • 3872601 • STMI
- Río Vilama • 22.91723°S 68.18939°W • 3868219 • STMI
- Estero de la Cueva Blanca • 23.00257°S 67.10603°W • 3893113 • STM
- Río Aguas Calientes • 23.08333°S 67.41667°W • 3900420 • STMI
- Quebrada de Hónar • 23.18333°S 68.1°W • 3887970 • STMI • (Quebrada de Honar, Quebrada de Hónar, Rio de Honar, Río de Hónar) • (CL)
- Río Salado • 23.29445°S 67.30146°W • 3872600 • STMI
- Río San Pedro de Atacama • 23.30461°S 68.21839°W • 3871789 • STMI • (Rio Atacama, Rio San Pedro, Río San Pedro)

- Quebrada de Río Grande • 22.8042°S 68.19945°W • 3873122 • STMI • (Quebrada de Rio Grande, Quebrada de Río Grande, Rio Grande, Río Grande)

- Río Putana • 22.51133°S 68.06978°W • 3874563 • STMI

- Quebrada del Río Seco • 23.41375°S 69.43731°W • 3873099 • STMI
- Río Pili • 23.47122°S 67.5614°W • 3876002 • STM
- Quebrada Chamaca • 23.47886°S 67.53726°W • 3895593 • STMI • (Arroyo de Chamaca, Quebrada Chamaca, Rio Chamaca, Río Chamaca)
- Río Tulán • 23.78032°S 68.11391°W • 3868954 • STMI
- Quebrada Río Blanco • 23.93451°S 67.58528°W • 3873146 • STMI
- Río Frío • 24.89617°S 68.98834°W • 3889287 • STM
- Quebrada Río Seco • 25.01505°S 70.33368°W • 3873101 • STMI

== See also ==
- List of lakes in Chile
- List of volcanoes in Chile
- List of islands of Chile
- List of fjords, channels, sounds and straits of Chile
- List of lighthouses in Chile
