= Camarones River =

River in Chile

Coordinates: 19.185684°S 70.273872°W

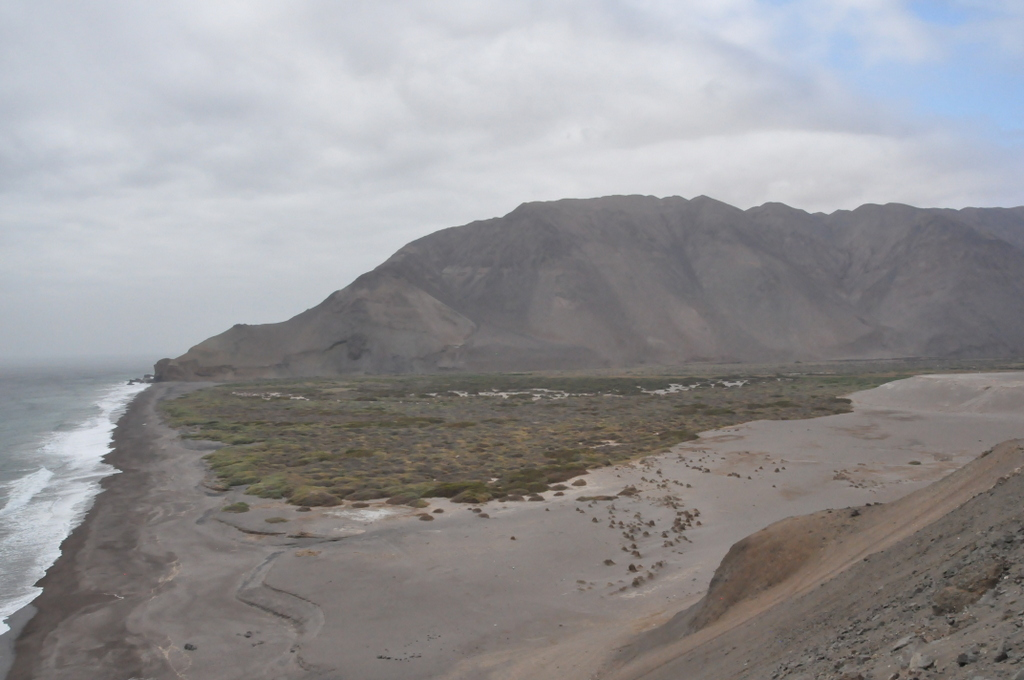

Location
- Country: Chile

The Camerones River in the Arica and Parinacota Region of Chile

The Camarones River is a river of northern Chile. It flows through the Atacama Desert and enters the Pacific Ocean near the small village of Caleta Camarones.

== See also ==
- List of rivers of Chile
