= List of rivers of Chile (P–Z) =

The information regarding the (Chilean) river names from P-Z on this page has been compiled from the data supplied by GeoNames. It includes all features named "Rio", "Canal", "Arroyo", "Estero" and those Feature Code is associated with a stream of water. (Note: The arbitrarily selected codes are RPDS, CHN, CNLA, CNLB, CNLD, CNLI, CNLN, CNLSB, CRKT, DTCH, DTCHI, DTCHD, ESTY, FORD, SBED, STM, STMA, STMB, STMC, STMD, STMH, STMI, STMIX, STMM, STMQ, STMS, STMSB, STMX, TNLC, WTRC, WTRH)

== Content ==
This list contains:

- Name of the stream, in Spanish language
- Latitude and a link to a GeoNames map of the river
- Height (elevation) of the mouth in meters
- Other names for the same feature, if any

Ordered list of rivers of Chile P-Z
Name	Lat & map	Mouth height (m)	Other names
Pabellones	-33.73333	165	
Pabellón	-43.22418	12	
Pablo	-48.3364	191	
Pachacama	-32.87972	683	
Pachagua	-37.04572	108	
Paco-Paco	-21.22162	3883	(Paco-Paco, Pacopaco)
Pacunto	-38.53613	1087	(Pancunto, Pacunto, Rio Pacunto Pedregoso, Pacunto, Río Pacunto Pedregoso)
Padre	-53.55601	169	
Paicaví	-37.99333	5	(Paicavi, Rio Paicovi, Paicaví, Río Paicovi)
Paico	-33.66667	217	
Paifú	-38.82047	89	
Paila	-42.06772	44	
Pailahueque	-38.09183	338	
Pailcoaillo	-18.89228	3687	
Pailimo	-34.28104	208	
Paillacahue	-37.36306	15	
Paillihue	-37.5127	109	
Paine	-51.16565	29	
Paine	-33.83014	362	
Paiva	-36.32107	1477	
Pajarito	-40.66085	448	
Pajillas	-37.51121	192	
Palacios	-34.90207	2393	
Palena	-43.93771	45	
Palena	-43.60078	228	
Palihue	-41.50166	20	
Palmilla	-34.289	127	
Palo Botado	-37.67067	344	(Palo Botado, Palo Botado)
Palomo	-30.74276	1216	
Palo Santo	-38.4823	260	(Palo Santo, Palo Santo)
Palos de San Pedro	-35.39405	944	(Palos San Pedro, Rio Patos de San Pedro, Palos de San Pedro, Río Patos de San Pedro)
Palos	-52.69715	5	
Palos Secos	-36.68936	1303	
Palpahuén	-42.64105	18	
Palpal	-36.93725	190	
Palpal	-36.82204	70	
Palvitad	-43.08197	338	(Palbitad, Rio Palvitad, Palbitad, Río Palvitad)
Pama	-31.11224	726	
Pampa Bonita	-40.97679	64	
Pampita	-43.84011	59	
Panamá	-34.6865	146	
Pancho Campos	-47.08918	197	
Pan de Azúcar	-44.24008	272	
Pangal	-34.23498	854	
Pangal	-41.4761	104	(Pangal, Pangal, Pangal)
Pangal	-37.06244	100	
Pangal	-45.16945	131	
Pangua	-40.73434	10	
Pangue	-37.89996	426	
Pangue	-37.87056	7	
Pangue	-36.51923	368	(Pangue, Estero Panque)
Paniagua	-36.44975	52	
Pañol	-42.66195	3	
Panqueco	-40.25068	62	
Panqueco	-39.82488	179	
Panqueco	-38.01667	206	
Panqueco	-37.51349	111	
Panqueco	-37.11558	252	
Panqueto	-38.11019	175	
Pantanillo	-36.71003	202	
Pantanillos	-37.49863	344	
Pantanito	-52.98968	141	
Pantanos	-53.41336	3	(Pantano, Rio Pantanos, Pantanos)
Pantanos	-52.69667	7	(Pantano, Rio Pantanos, Pantano, Río Pantanos)
Pantanos	-44.47882	743	
Pantanoso	-40.43373	193	(Pantanoso, Estero Pantaoso)
Papal	-36.57635	31	
Paquisa	-18.59269	4042	
Parado	-46.12812	304	(Parado, Parado)
Paragua	-40.29863	20	
Paralelo	-54.22134	5	
Paramillos	-33.30066	2370	
Paredes	-41.57177	3	
Paredones	-34.228	1597	
Paredones	-27.60854	2884	(Paredones, Paredones, Paredones)
Paredones	-34.62783	8	
Parga	-41.21797	44	
Pario	-41.16006	15	
Parraguirre	-33.44945	2063	
Parral	-36.02953	138	
Parral	-34.2456	290	
Pascua	-48.22673	18	
Pascua	-44.31667	115	
Pasijiro	-19.21667	4186	
Paso Ancho	-37.37957	100	
Paso Hondo	-37.49059	100	(Paso Honda, Estero Paso Hondo)
Paso Hondo	-37.28919	88	
Paso Malo	-40.96554	83	
Paso Malo	-39.99681	27	
Paso Malo	-38.16788	187	
Pastos Largos	-26.71667	3834	(Pastos Largas, Rio Pastos Largos, Pastos Largas, Río Pastos Largos)
Patacón	-38.78333	67	
Patacón	-34.86802	38	
Pataguas	-36.53333	106	(Bulutao, Estero Patagua, Estero Pataguas)
Patahuecó	-37.35156	221	
Patillos	-30.95972	1877	
Pato	-41.19755	30	
Pato	-41.40518	41	
Paule	-38.53604	1088	
Paulin	-37.54244	617	
Paulul	-38.67732	572	
Pedernales	-32.1	1132	
Pedernal	-32.20808	663	(Chaloco, Pedernal, Pedernal)
Pedregoso	-44.67348	464	
Pedregoso	-44.60769	547	
Pedregoso	-44.43484	318	
Pedregoso	-39.16438	184	
Pedregoso	-38.52906	937	
Pedregoso	-46.7298	511	
Pedregoso	-47.60886	29	
Pedregoso	-45.48962	715	
Pedregoso	-45.09506	174	
Pedrero	-46.53761	403	
Pehuenco	-38.63633	1007	(Pehueco, Rio Pehuenco, Pehueco, Río Pehuenco)
Pehuenco	-38.28482	800	
Pehuenco	-38.3743	439	
Pelahuenco	-38.03333	1013	
Pelal	-38.84202	66	(El Peral, Estero Pelal)
Pelarco	-35.37119	145	
Pelarco	-35.33333	138	
Pelchue	-38.13296	1418	
Pelchuquin	-39.64349	3	
Peldehue	-33.17629	526	
Peleco	-37.90136	12	
Pelehue	-38.02972	122	(Napanir, Estero Naponir, Estero Pelehue)
Pelehue	-37.60949	85	
Pelhuenco	-38.48046	934	(Blanco, Estero Pelhuenco)
Pellahuén	-38.4611	39	
Pellomenco	-37.75801	66	
Pelluco	-39.5767	30	
Pelluhué	-35.80741	12	
Pelumpén	-32.9923	83	
Pemuco	-37.59183	182	
Pemuco	-36.98214	208	
Pemulemu	-37.95335	333	
Peñascoso	-46.27854	206	(Penascoso, Arroyo Peñascoso, Penascoso, Estero Peñascoso)
Penco	-36.74167	16	
Penco	-36.73194	4	
Peñol	-41.61288	1	
Peñón	-34.43333	292	
Peñón	-32.88333	1914	
Pequeño	-41.21667	928	
Peral	-31.02447	291	
Peralillo	-34.41847	125	
Peralillo	-33.62293	131	
Percán	-38.35	221	(Pencon, Estero Percan, Estero Percán)
Perdices	-37.06841	1117	(las Perdices, Perdices)
Perdidos	-44.69732	1067	
Pérez	-53.55544	173	
Pérez	-52.5576	3	
Pérez	-48.8	263	
Pérez	-48.21066	436	
Perquenco	-38.4265	94	(Perquenco, Perquenco, Perquenco)
Perquilauquén	-35.83325	101	
Perquin	-35.56654	219	
Perquite	-38.78054	115	
Peruco	-37.13356	654	
Pescadero	-40.78158	129	(Pescadero, Pescadero, Pescadero)
Pescado	-52.91718	3	(Pescado, Rio Pezcado, Pescado, Río Pezcado)
Pescado	-41.25164	55	(Calbuco, Rio Pescado, Calbuco, Río Pescado)
Pescado	-40.88827	134	
Pescado	-40.05081	76	
Pescado	-45.43303	72	
Pescadores	-40.7136	187	
Petorca	-32.3873	20	(Pelorca, Rio Petorca, Petorca)
Petrenco	-39.13972	166	
Petrohué	-41.38079	2	(Petrohue, Petrohué)
Petronquines	-37.48333	1397	(Petronpuines, Estero Petronquines)
Peuco	-38.8579	419	
Peuco	-39.95554	3	
Peuco	-33.94504	446	(Peuco, Estero Peuco, Estero Peuco, Peuco, Peuco)
Peulla	-41.04979	196	
Peupeu	-38.56866	184	
Picacho	-44.91072	38	
Picaflor	-44.99066	248	
Picana	-51.31349	52	
Picano	-33.63333	166	
Picarquín	-33.9866	504	(Cajon Picarquin, Cajón de Picarquín, Picarquin, Estero Picarquín)
Picaso	-40.91895	116	
Picazo	-35.44155	197	
Piche	-34.02659	184	
Pichiamar	-38.08781	474	
Pichi Blanco	-45.89089	501	
Pichiblanco	-41.40941	314	
Pichibudi	-34.87929	70	
Pichibureo	-37.78164	268	
Pichicallín	-37.95919	277	
Pichicaramávida	-37.69316	81	
Pichi-Cautín	-38.60006	51	
Pichi-Cautín	-38.1588	63	
Pichi-Chirri	-40.55966	183	
Pichicholguahue	-37.55069	134	
Pichi-Chonleufu	-40.69875	230	
Pichico	-39.9183	74	
Pichico	-39.10014	484	
Pichico	-38.73984	24	
Pichico	-38.11357	111	
Pichicoihueco	-40.87388	130	
Pichi-Coihueco	-40.59962	18	
Pichicollahue	-37.52399	1455	
Pichicolo	-42.00577	4	(Pichicolo, Estero Pichicolu)
Pichicope	-40.93574	176	
Pichicoreo	-37.49354	249	
Pichi Damas	-40.57219	20	(Pichi Damas, Damas, Damas)
Pichiguao	-34.35956	343	
Pichi	-38.35879	57	
Pichi-Iculpe	-40.3363	387	
Pichi-Ignao	-40.37229	364	
Pichi-Lag	-40.71494	191	
Pichilaguna	-41.26952	89	
Pichilefén	-39.29834	222	
Pichil	-40.70957	51	
Pichi Llay-Llay	-40.8832	80	
Pichillenquehue	-37.74263	24	
Pichilleuque	-38.70842	407	
Pichilluanco	-36.71019	205	
Pichilo	-37.26938	21	
Pichilolenco	-37.8634	111	
Pichiluanco	-37.24188	210	
Pichi Lumaco	-38.16498	60	
Pichi-Malleco	-38.19722	631	
Pichimulchén	-37.90836	468	
Pichi Pehuenco	-38.5702	957	
Pichipehuén	-37.55962	485	
Pichipichone	-40.33207	65	
Pichipilluco	-41.47555	3	
Pichipolcura	-37.32136	634	
Pichi Temuco	-38.71861	112	(Curaco, Pichi Temuco)
Pichi Tralihué	-38.58681	1356	
Pichitropen	-37.28915	125	
Pichoy	-39.58519	4	
Pichul	-40.73015	234	
Pico	-44.23333	1002	(Pico, Pico)
Picoiquén	-37.79975	71	
Picuche	-38.91136	78	
Pidelco	-38.09584	22	
Pidenco	-39.16063	58	
Pidenco	-38.03201	211	
Pidihuinco	-34.82415	300	
Piedra Blanca	-39.87721	5	
Piedra	-41.223	60	
Piedra	-39.94122	177	
Piedra	-41.54705	71	(Piedra, de Piedra)
Piedras Altas	-40.82454	738	
Piedras de Amolar	-36.07251	126	
Piedras Grandes	-22.29583	3550	
Piedras	-44.57119	70	
Piedras	-40.94978	75	
Piedras Rojas	-38.16322	739	
Piga	-20.03246	3924	
Piguchen	-35.90687	123	
Piguchen	-35.9	127	
Pihun	-38.18333	330	
Pike	-53.33198	20	
Pilauco	-40.56939	20	
Pile	-37.66441	171	
Pilenechico	-38.28562	402	
Pileo	-37.0793	39	
Pilico	-39.28223	182	
Pili	-23.47122	4199	
Pilihue	-38.01667	111	
Pilildeo	-41.05	108	
Pililos	-48.12178	322	
Pillahuenco	-38.41466	64	(Pellahuenco, Estero Pillahuenco)
Pillanco	-38.86606	92	
Pillanleufu	-40.24679	108	
Pille Cozcoz	-39.66563	56	
Pillo-Mallín	-38.68333	157	
Pilluco	-41.48749	11	
Pilluco	-36.93674	187	
Pillunmamilco	-38.40791	389	
Pilmaiquén	-40.35021	8	
Pilmaiquén	-40.12607	351	
Pilmaiquén	-37.7517	23	
Pilpilco	-37.57158	34	
Pilquén	-37.76667	192	
Pilunchaya	-37.72791	1003	
Pinares	-37.95805	670	
Pinca	-38.06908	633	
Pincura	-36.6648	180	
Pingo	-51.08444	96	
Pingueral	-36.49779	7	
Pinilmapu	-38.14743	82	
Pino Hachado	-38.6653	1095	
Pino	-37.48803	1404	
Pino Hueco	-37.67003	352	
Pino Solo	-38.62625	1115	
Pino Solo	-38.55637	1476	
Pinotalca	-35.56195	12	(Empedrado, Rio Pinotalca, Empedrado, Río Pinotalca)
Pinto	-52.53565	3	
Pipilos	-38.95	82	
Pircas Coloradas	-27.99143	2651	
Pirén	-39.39262	3	
Pisagua	-41.39303	40	
Pispico	-38.65284	27	
Pitildeo	-41.02049	105	(Pilildeo, Estero Pitildeo)
Pitraco	-38.55485	29	
Pitraco	-38.71008	27	
Pitraco	-38.47188	158	
Pitraleo	-37.29598	17	
Pitril	-40.69588	5	
Pitril Norte	-37.76676	566	
Pitril Sur	-37.83591	523	
Pitruco	-40.26665	121	
Piuchén	-41.21558	30	
Piuquencillo	-33.91693	1551	
Piuquenes	-31.76107	2497	
Plalafquén	-39.50543	7	
Planchado	-41.0841	117	
Plata	-28.98068	1368	
Plata	-41.26236	232	
Playa Blanca	-41.4466	250	
Plaza	-27.95148	2736	
Plegarias	-37.4768	136	
Plomo	-33.63305	2780	
Plomo	-32.76523	651	
Población	-40.90821	167	
Población	-35.14217	75	
Población	-34.65718	182	
Pocopio	-40.35423	7	
Pocuno	-38.03697	18	
Pocuro	-32.81667	896	
Pocuro	-32.76408	649	(Pocuro)
Poduco	-38.45847	167	
Poguilcha	-38.75752	72	
Poiguén	-41.66667	15	
Poipoico	-38.41672	362	
Polcura	-37.33026	669	
Polcura	-40.24824	45	
Polcura	-37.36769	336	
Polcura	-31.6079	2851	(Polcura, Los Estero Polcura, Los Estero Polcura)
Polizones	-41.13894	137	
Polloico	-40.57307	85	
Pollollo	-41.81192	12	
Pollux	-45.70606	477	
Polpaico	-33.20025	519	
Polqui	-30.79102	588	
Polucos	-38.06889	264	
Polvareda	-37.21337	93	
Ponce	-36.41704	1477	
Poncho	-44.38836	555	
Ponio	-30.70466	435	(Campanario, Rio Ponio, Campanario, Río Ponio)
Ponpongo	-39.91483	80	
Popeta	-33.78816	67	
Porcelana	-42.41803	6	
Porfiado	-38.59904	967	
Portezuelo	-48.66309	527	
Portezuelo	-46.12861	322	
Portezuelo	-36.52104	88	
Portillo Hondo	-32.48573	3130	
Portillo	-34.79781	1365	
Portillo	-31.94232	2422	
Porvenir	-53.29922	3	
Potrerillo de las Yeguas	-40.98705	102	
Potrerillo	-29.33318	2206	
Potrerillos	-33.35481	2256	
Potrero de las Yeguas	-37.52433	1452	
Potrero Escondido	-33.03048	2400	
Potrero Escondido	-32.90471	2369	
Potrero Grande	-36.11853	1044	
Potrero Grande	-35.17814	439	
Potrero Grande	-35.01084	337	
Potrero Largo	-32.09053	2159	
Potro	-28.21345	2047	
Poza del Toro	-34.28574	16	
Pozo de Oro	-41.22165	106	
Pozuelos	-37.58937	58	
Prado	-33.91307	142	
Prat	-52.6694	4	
Prat	-51.55617	16	
Prat	-51.48559	59	
Presidente Ríos	-46.32532	4	
Presidente Roosevelt	-45.00729	83	
Primera Agua	-37.58333	227	
Primero	-29.5562	2819	
Principal	-36.65539	624	
Púa	-38.3649	265	
Puangue	-33.73959	87	(Puangue, Estero Pangue, Estero de Pedegua)
Puangue	-33.65	179	
Pucalán	-32.76945	70	
Pucalume	-29.83333	1260	
Pucayán	-39.28191	248	
Puchabrán	-42.39023	92	
Puchanquin	-42.60447	82	
Puchepo	-35.83333	-9999	
Puchultisa	-19.38797	4070	
Pucolón	-39.02701	18	
Pucón	-39.24976	217	(Minetue, Rio Pucon, Minetué, Río Pucón)
Pudelle	-41.92496	15	
Pudeto	-41.91414	6	
Pudidi	-42.24385	43	
Pudimávida	-34.69059	200	
Pudú	-35.1596	14	
Puelche	-41.75416	19	
Puelche	-35.82978	1060	
Puello	-38.8203	142	
Puelo Chico	-41.65102	4	
Puelo	-41.65	15	(Puelo, Puelo)
Puelo	-42.045	406	
Puelón	-37.7	1376	
Puelpun	-41.59304	1	
Puentes	-41.28333	56	
Puentes	-38.57698	734	
Puertecillas	-31.65438	2279	
Puesco	-39.53217	719	
Pugñr	-39.77354	133	
Pulido	-28.04551	1218	
Pulín	-34.09256	108	
Pullafquén	-39.57213	16	
Pullay	-36.03314	12	
Pulol	-38.81533	4	
Púlpito	-42.73595	26	
Pulul	-38.34879	1031	
Pulul	-39.15082	96	
Puma	-41.00975	53	
Pumalal	-38.68462	145	
Pumanque	-34.63593	76	
Pumol	-42.74537	5	
Punahue	-39.91253	70	
Punco	-39.84195	92	
Punilla	-29.79458	3088	
Puñin	-41.80591	3	
Punitaqui	-30.67092	37	(Punitaqui, Punitaqui)
Punitaqui	-30.63333	184	
Punta del Monte	-45.31667	561	
Punta Negra	-38.53807	926	
Puntiagudo	-41.0783	196	
Puntra	-42.04948	2	
Pupío	-31.86116	76	
Pupitrén	-41.33333	36	
Puquitrahue	-40.94394	77	
Puquitrín	-41.67667	16	
Purapel	-35.82196	113	
Purema	-36.44433	10	
Purén	-38.07915	66	
Purén	-34.27604	272	
Purgatorio	-37.34354	134	
Purilauquén	-42.67109	3	(Boca Peirilauguen, Purilauquen, Purilauquén)
Puripica	-22.7689	3205	
Puritauquén	-42.6425	65	(Puritauquen, Rio Quitacalzon, Puritauquén, Río Quitacalzon)
Puro	-33.78959	56	
Purutún	-32.78333	350	
Pusulhuin	-38.68503	139	
Putaendo	-32.73175	602	
Putagán	-35.70056	85	
Putame	-40.74726	59	
Putana	-22.51133	4206	
Putraiguén	-40.71449	44	
Putraiquen	-39.91378	130	
Putratrau	-41.36667	1	
Putregual	-39.68542	41	
Putros	-39.42428	327	
Putú	-35.2	6	
Putun	-41.75066	5	
Puyehue	-39.23333	100	
Quebrada Honda	-46.7094	459	
Quebrada	-40.40769	135	
Queche	-41.98646	12	(Queche, Queche)
Quechereguas	-38.96074	300	(Loncoche, Estero Quechereguas)
Quechué	-39.53924	13	
Quelén	-31.85593	683	
Quelhue	-39.23688	221	
Quelihue	-38.7049	35	(Molluco, Estero Quelihue)
Quemado	-41.52116	399	
Quema	-39.14658	153	
Quemazones	-37.10438	1378	
Quempo	-33.50863	1324	
Quenco	-37.82898	350	
Quenuco	-38.86667	420	
Quenuir	-41.49314	3	
Queñuvuta	-19.46638	3823	(Quenuvuta, Arroyo de Queñuvuta, Challavilque)
Quepe	-38.78119	24	
Queteleufu	-38.76357	797	
Quetén	-41.94093	4	
Quetraleufu	-38.77356	700	
Quetraltué	-38.12002	76	
Quetro	-45.56545	131	
Quetro	-45.66265	275	
Quetru	-48.11667	579	
Quetrulauquén	-41.6717	11	
Queulat	-44.53983	13	
Queule	-39.39031	1	
Queule	-38.55231	655	
Queuque	-37.95834	113	
Quiahue	-34.75096	87	
Quiapo	-37.43902	33	(Quiapo, Quiapo)
Quiburcanca	-18.58333	4079	
Quicho	-37.66229	319	
Quidico	-37.38139	17	
Quidico	-38.24922	6	
Quihue	-40.388	31	
Quilaco	-38.41302	141	
Quilaco	-38.28903	443	
Quilaco	-38.16667	266	
Quilaco	-37.51722	296	
Quilacoya	-37.0498	32	
Quilacura	-38.62445	190	
Quilanco	-38.02096	76	(Ininco, Estero Quilanco)
Quilán	-43.32442	12	
Quilanlar	-43.34611	7	
Quilantar	-43.35287	29	(Quilanlar, Rio Quilantar, Quilanlar, Río Quilantar)
Quilapalo	-37.7045	287	
Quilapan	-38.21167	257	
Quila Seca	-43.24022	267	
Quildaco	-41.8726	9	
Quile	-38.05343	955	
Quileno	-39.22414	374	
Quiles	-30.99215	206	
Quilico	-34.89315	45	
Quilicura	-34.18961	121	
Quilicura	-34.3	142	
Quilicura	-33.36667	478	
Quilihue	-40.4721	93	
Quilimarí	-32.12202	10	
Quilinco	-38.86667	73	
Quillaicahue	-38	1184	
Quillaico	-42.28006	88	
Quillaileo	-37.89591	477	
Quillayes	-35.20238	114	(Quillayes, Los Quillayes)
Quillaylebu	-37.32445	603	
Quilleco	-37.53659	269	
Quillehua	-37.78113	148	
Quillén	-38.4938	905	
Quillén	-38.43422	38	
Quillén	-39.85609	178	
Quillén	-39.43176	82	
Quillen	-38.73797	33	
Quillín	-41.2526	171	
Quillín	-40.27877	92	
Quillón	-36.78562	72	
Quilmo	-37.7149	268	
Quilmo	-36.64446	85	
Quilpolemu	-36.42245	18	
Quilpué	-33.0468	109	
Quilpué	-32.73278	601	
Quilque	-42.64829	8	
Quilque	-40.90912	116	
Quilque	-37.39685	83	
Quilquilci	-38.35562	6	
Quilquilco	-38.19132	285	
Quimán	-40.12539	66	
Quimpo	-37.76683	173	
Quiñaco	-38.47381	256	
Quinahueco	-37.75268	70	
Quinahue	-37.7471	1	
Quincanque	-33.78606	50	
Quinched	-41.76487	3	(Quinched)
Quinchilca	-39.85383	34	
Quiñenahuín	-39.20988	675	
Quiñicabén	-34.01888	181	
Quino	-38.32528	84	
Quinquebueno	-37.10054	135	
Quinque	-39.02548	31	
Quinquén	-38.6672	1177	
Quinquichán	-39.25	159	
Quinquihueno	-37.07257	172	
Quintana	-34.79111	275	(Carrizal, Estero Quintana)
Quintero	-32.88587	9	(Quintero, Estero Quintero)
Quinto	-43.9628	101	
Quintrilpe	-38.65776	154	
Quipuca	-38.0617	628	
Quiques	-37.27579	34	
Quiripio	-38.63411	164	
Quirquincho	-37.58687	173	
Quitacalzones	-41.31965	275	
Quito	-41.88599	3	
Quitrahue	-39.13388	91	(Puyehue, Estero Quitrahue)
Quiu-Quenes	-35.85241	206	
Quivolgo	-35.31661	12	
Rabicano	-33.41322	2282	
Rabones	-36.7444	1112	
Rabuco	-32.84837	291	
Racui	-38.16592	990	
Radalco	-38.38015	485	
Radal	-40.04727	78	
Rafael	-36.52514	11	(Lingueral, Rio Rafael, Lingueral, Río Rafael)
Rafunco	-40.78844	61	
Rahue	-40.33945	8	
Rahue	-38.39776	859	
Rahuelanco	-37.93104	200	
Raíces	-32.07944	1528	
Ralco	-38.05006	817	
Ralicura	-39.57226	11	
Ralipitra	-38.76667	25	
Ralitrán	-40.2634	52	(Bolitran, Estero Bolitrán, Estero Palitran, Estero Ralitran, Estero Ralitrán)
Rallinco	-38.1152	182	
Ramadas	-28.15897	1605	
Ramadillas	-28.11303	2135	
Ramadillas	-37.46667	597	
Rama	-34.5216	302	
Ranas	-37.48244	138	
Ranchillos	-37.05484	153	
Rancura	-34.96802	26	
Ranquilco	-38.38621	83	
Ranquilco	-38.10714	67	
Ranquilco	-37.83865	5	
Ránquil	-38.27094	792	
Ránquil	-37.52845	5	
Ránquil	-38.57954	45	(Danguil, Danguil, Estero Ranquil, Estero Ránquil)
Ranquilmo	-37.94914	10	
Ranquintuleufu	-39.82337	223	
Rapaculo	-32.85	654	
Rapa	-38.81667	95	
Rapa	-38.56667	73	
Rapel	-33.90418	3	
Rapel	-30.71505	476	
Rapel	-33.93802	16	
Rapilermo	-35.11463	29	
Rapú	-36.40528	14	
Raquecura	-37.17729	59	
Raquelita	-42.10417	2001	
Raqui	-37.23686	1	
Raqui	-38.01667	158	
Raquilca	-37.70183	129	
Raquín	-38.11128	167	
Rari	-35.67652	47	
Rari	-35.77528	182	
Rarinco	-37.39275	85	
Rarirruca	-38.42455	421	
Ratones	-37.08495	1214	
Rauco	-42.54611	6	
Rayas	-42.76292	3	(Blanco, Rio Rayas, Blanco, Río Rayas)
Rayas	-42.79464	61	
Rayo	-36.39969	112	
Recinto	-37.7036	69	
Refugio	-42.16757	10	
Rehuecoyán	-38.41421	184	(Coyan, Estero Coyán, Estero Rehuecoyan, Estero Rehuecoyán)
Rehue	-37.78077	67	
Rehue	-39.74964	9	
Rehuelhue	-38.95613	45	
Rehuén	-37.75082	142	
Reiguaico	-39.70119	216	
Relbo	-33.49534	1603	
Relbún	-36.86878	83	
Relbún	-36.21239	1102	
Rele	-37.2789	50	
Reloca	-35.65248	9	
Reloncaví	-41.3594	44	
Relún	-38.28884	77	
Remeco	-38.18686	175	
Remehue	-39.91141	115	
Remehue	-40.52628	32	
Remehue	-39.88883	123	
Remolinos	-35.86667	245	
Reñaca	-37.73255	157	
Reñaca	-32.97324	15	
Renaco	-38.61186	26	
Renaico	-37.6648	62	
Renegado	-36.8714	621	
Renegado	-37.54542	713	
Reñico	-38.10616	159	
Reñico	-37.19315	261	
Reñico	-38.18086	99	
Reñico	-37.90296	384	(Penico, Estero Peñico, Estero Renico, Estero Reñico)
Reñihué	-42.82193	51	
Reñihué	-42.57697	6	
Repucura	-38.4941	25	
Repute	-37.82368	40	
Requen	-37.93213	107	
Rere	-37.13719	119	
Reremo	-42.48303	12	
Rerihuire	-37.99151	551	
Resbalón	-48.12868	227	
Resbalón	-46.44353	224	
Resbole	-48.10918	130	
Rey	-41.64623	5	
Riachuelo	-40.81104	44	
Richards	-45.28455	590	
Riecillos	-36.09452	924	
Riecillos	-32.92308	1291	
Riesco	-45.48011	33	
Rí Huirinlil	-39.33435	482	(Ri Huirinlil, Huirintil, Rí Huirinlil, Huirintil)
Rillahueco	-38.32135	56	
Rilpe	-38.76667	755	
Rinconada	-40.50595	503	
Rincón Los Bueyes	-33.72633	932	
Riñico	-37.24557	480	
Riñinahue	-40.33164	64	
Río Blanco	-23.93451	4038	
Río Blanco	-21.26463	3822	(Blanco, Quebrada Blanco, Rio Blanco, Río Blanco)
Rïo Cachitos	-27.88562	3121	(Cachito, Rio Cachitos, Rio Chacrita, Cachito, Rïo Cachitos)
Río de Collo	-28.76667	1281	
Río Grande	-22.8042	2586	(Grande, Quebrada de Grande, Rio Grande, Río Grande)
Río Lisboa	-29.75	1604	
Ríopardo	-37.50535	238	
Río Seco	-53.05808	6	(Seco, Estero Seco, Rio Seco, Río Seco)
Río Seco	-23.41375	1565	
Río Seco	-26.00092	857	
Río Seco	-25.01505	1488	
Río Seco	-21.97808	1039	
Río Seco	-36.91667	170	
Ríos Pocas Pilchas	-48.67079	418	
Risopatrón	-44.06021	51	
Rivas	-51.53923	48	
Riveros	-53.90966	122	
Roble	-40.41068	27	
Robles	-41.14314	138	
Robles	-43.35586	52	
Rocacura	-37.53245	742	(El Rocacura, Rocacura)
Roca	-54.73972	15	
Rocillo	-46.52297	781	
Rocín	-32.50105	1196	
Rodriguero	-40.8192	144	
Rodríguez	-43.83182	4	
Rodríguez	-36.07737	1655	
Rogers	-52.85085	4	
Rollizo	-41.45163	2	
Ronquillo	-38.18001	313	
Rosado	-44.14188	108	
Rosal	-35.91975	148	
Rosario	-53.45797	21	(Ossa, Rio Rosario, Rosario)
Rosario	-33.96976	26	(El Rosario, Estero Rosario)
Rosario	-33.44553	13	(El Rosario, Estero Rosario)
Rosario	-36.45409	147	
Rosselot	-43.96984	64	
Rucacalquin	-38.11615	151	
Rucacalquin	-37.77219	184	
Rucaco	-38.39933	61	
Rucacura	-39.09201	10	
Rucanahue	-39.90552	142	
Rucañanco	-38.65306	1122	
Rucañuco	-38.72394	1093	
Rucanuco	-38.13983	82	
Ruca Pehuen	-38.45021	188	
Rucapichin	-39.66806	14	
Rucaquilau	-40.04839	76	
Ruca Raqui	-37.78072	41	
Ruca Ruca	-38.32811	77	
Rucausey	-38.1934	1410	
Rucúe	-37.3	345	
Ruful	-40.82082	816	
Ruiz	-34.66667	464	
Rulo	-41.6969	52	(Rulo, Rulo, Rulo)
Rumalhue	-38.56494	407	
Rumulhue	-38.59715	28	
Runcahue	-39.4213	80	
Rungue	-33.02037	687	
Runque	-47.3337	527	
Rupameica	-40.32998	461	
Rusphen	-53.84891	150	(Ausphen, Rio Rusphen, Ausphen, Río Rusphen)
Saavedra	-35.84935	1979	
Sagllúe	-40.69938	38	(Llagllue, Estero Llagllúe, Estero Sagllue, Estero Sagllúe)
Saíno	-32.73958	732	
Salado	-26.51667	4028	
Salado	-26.36667	2849	
Salado	-23.29445	4191	
Salado	-22.80401	2584	
Salado	-26.36667	2762	
Salado	-22.37099	2504	(Salado, Salado)
Salca	-40.74796	56	
Sallipulli	-39.09168	867	
Salto de Agua	-33.81755	1520	
Salto del Agua	-34.0883	108	
Salto	-47.29553	84	
Salto	-41.24435	27	
Salto	-43.41569	14	
Salto	-38.47529	913	(El Salto, Salto)
Salto	-38.35864	222	(El Salto, Estero Salto)
Salto	-38.05088	257	(El Salto, Estero Salto)
Salto	-46.3038	226	(Fiero, Arroyo Salto)
Salto	-45.4443	-2	
Saltuco	-37.8189	528	
San Alfonso	-33.73404	1093	
San Andrés	-34.7575	1530	
San Antonio	-53.08624	104	
San Antonio	-34.73418	193	
San Antonio	-41.9525	6	
San Antonio	-42.97146	4	
San Antonio	-41.44502	46	
San Antonio	-41.77316	5	
San Bernabé	-53.68496	61	
San Bernardo	-33.60006	582	
San Bernardo	-33.6	703	
San Carlos	-36.42691	137	(Navotavo, Estero San Carlos)
San Carlos	-33.41667	618	
Sancarrón	-29.56267	3344	
San Cristóbal	-37.19546	89	
San Cristóbal	-37.19315	71	
San Francisco	-33.94644	444	
San Francisco	-33.3733	1137	
San Francisco	-38.49073	351	
San Francisco	-35.74532	2088	
San Francisco	-35.58333	67	
San Francisco	-34.14122	278	
San Francisco	-32.74144	720	(San Francisco, San Francisco)
San Francisco	-33.56831	626	
San Gabriel	-33.78003	1209	
San Isidro	-32.93674	68	
San Javier	-36.3922	135	
San Jerónimo	-37.36955	90	
San Jerónimo	-33.35569	10	
San Joaquín	-33.48333	548	
San José	-39.59696	7	
San José	-18.46854	16	
San José	-53.80643	9	
San José	-41.71315	8	
San José	-33.65647	967	
San José	-53.54184	193	
San José	-37.11199	210	
San José	-35.4539	1580	
San José	-33.61667	156	
San Juan	-53.64991	10	(Grave, Rio San Juan, San Juan)
San Juan	-41.18713	10	
San Juan	-39.92711	1	
San Juan	-36.14294	179	
San Juan	-33.64567	19	
San Juan	-42.33448	4	
San Juan	-34.66667	464	
San Lorenzo	-47.49737	739	
San Luis	-41.06023	9	
San Luis	-36.81543	110	
San Miguel	-30.81298	1260	
San Miguel	-34.30172	110	
San Miguel	-34.66667	334	
San Miguel	-32.71667	858	
San Nicolás	-33.75892	1612	
San Pablo	-40.37711	22	
San Pedro de Alcántara	-34.72901	7	(San Pedro Alcantara, Estero San Pedro de Alcántara, Estero de Alcantara, Estero de Alcántara)
San Pedro	-23.30461	2305	(Atacama, Rio San Pedro, San Pedro)
San Pedro	-40.9212	93	
San Pedro	-39.85272	32	
San Pedro	-35.31554	1034	
San Pedro	-21.96551	3019	
San Pedro	-37.93319	517	
San Pedro	-36.06475	1254	
San Pedro	-33.91316	136	
San Pedro	-32.93333	68	
San Pedro Nolasco	-41.65717	7	
San Ramón	-36.69768	42	(Cayumanque, Estero Cayumanqui, Estero San Ramon, Estero San Ramón)
San Ramón	-34.85499	240	
San Regis	-32.71667	625	
San Salvador	-22.39639	1213	(San Salvador, San Salvador)
San Sebastián	-45.61667	80	
Santa Ana	-38.43289	130	
Santa Celia	-38.65441	54	
Santa Celia	-35.70721	86	
San Tadeo	-46.76098	0	
Santa Gertrudis	-36.67897	713	
Santa Ludgarda	-53.94138	6	
Santa María	-53.40192	5	(Santa Maria, Rio los Lavaderos, Santa María)
Santa María	-53.37748	6	
Santa Rita	-33.70822	530	
Santa Rosa	-36.41508	41	
Santa Rosa	-36.97359	107	
Santa Susana	-52.6507	6	
Santo Domingo	-47.72639	23	
Santo Domingo	-39.91026	3	
Santo Domingo	-33.41667	618	
Santo Domingo	-43.9733	16	
Sanueco	-38.66782	1177	
Sauce	-34.37224	144	
Sauce	-33.67473	1004	
Sauce	-33.55604	1044	
Sauzal	-37.0646	155	
Sauzal	-35.71465	134	
Seco	-18.43373	2524	
Seco	-35.11438	311	
Seco	-34.9313	183	
Seco	-30.02483	2252	
Seco	-42.47955	29	
Seco	-34.45	343	
Seco	-34.20997	199	
Seco	-34.05141	529	
Seco	-32.72994	589	
Seco	-32.36667	281	
Seco	-43.44111	1016	
Sencata	-19.06488	4196	
Sepulco	-39.16314	115	
Serrano	-53.32123	340	
Serrano	-51.41343	4	(Serrano, Serrano)
Siberia	-43.93042	939	(Siberia, Silberia, Silberia)
Side	-52.68262	7	
Silamapu	-43.49323	62	
Silberia	-43.87556	1517	
Simpson conf .du Río Mañihuales	-45.4055	20	
Simpson	-45.45917	77	(Simpson, Simpson)
Simpson	-45.64141	239	
Simpson	-45.71433	288	(Aisen sur)
Sin Nombre	-41.36678	28	
Sin Nombre	-38.287	250	
Sin Nombre	-45.87208	422	
Sin Nombre	-41.00887	209	
Sin Nombre	-41.41501	242	
Sin Nombre	-41.25554	139	
Sin Nombre	-41.27858	213	
Sin Nombre	-41.81088	11	
Sirena Grande	-37.34158	105	
Sitani	-19.28176	3706	
Sobrante	-32.20943	663	(Sobrante, Rio Sobrante, Sobrante, Río del Sobrante)
Sobrante	-32.21667	631	
Sofía	-51.50825	53	
Soldado	-38.31667	298	
Soler	-46.98119	228	
Solís	-44.64234	518	
Sollinco	-38.73443	192	
Sordo	-48.07865	103	
Sorpresa	-46.01318	10	
Steffen	-41.66749	98	
Sucio	-43.37096	49	
Sucio	-48.20988	441	
Sur	-46.34989	17	
Sur	-41.27918	160	(Pescado Sur, Rio Sur, Pescado del Sur, Río Sur)
Sur	-42.8575	159	
Surire	-18.87203	4277	
Tabaco	-38.22974	881	
Tabal	-38.88333	95	
Tablaruca	-42.90227	4	
Tabo	-45.29874	5	
Taboleo	-37.46928	56	
Tabón Tinaja	-35.48902	46	
Tabunco	-35.21971	49	
Tacura	-38.853	533	
Tahuao Mallín	-38.3332	1243	
Taitay	-39.61194	241	
Talagante	-33.71667	281	
Talcan	-42.66646	4	
Tambillo	-39.71507	1	
Tambillos	-32.35871	2777	
Tambor	-41.57247	4	
Tana	-19.50388	589	(Camina, Quebrada de Camiña, Quebrada de Tana, Camina, Rio Camiña)
Tanguao	-35.44596	31	
Tangue	-30.3	1	(Tangue, Tangue, Tangue)
Tantauco	-42.08925	62	
Tapelco	-38.93774	358	
Tapihue	-37.12176	94	
Taruguire	-18.91111	3654	
Tascadero	-31.01422	1221	
Taucu	-36.16586	7	
Taylor	-41.51571	72	(Taylor, Taylor)
Techado	-41.06182	209	
Teguanieque	-37.9697	517	
Telele	-42.27234	4	
Temaleufu	-40.24709	64	
Témpanos	-46.53547	-9999	
Témpanos	-41.51972	443	
Temuco	-38.72699	106	
Temuco	-38.49664	180	
Temuco	-36.89076	227	(Temuco, Pemuco, Pemuco)
Temulemu	-38.33746	58	
Temumeo	-38.1	181	
Tenco	-41.7745	6	
Tenglo	-41.48333	98	
Teniente	-34.08333	2330	
Teñio	-41.57752	6	
Teno	-34.97947	149	
Tepual	-41.21667	53	
Tepú	-41.22167	52	(Tepu, Rio la Nutria, Tepú, Río Nutria)
Teresa	-46.28053	88	
Ternero	-30.5685	3112	
Tesoro	-53.0675	208	
Thomson	-53.52898	215	
Thomson	-54.93333	1	
Tictoc	-43.64576	10	
Tierras Blancas	-32.57693	75	
Tignamar	-18.43532	2551	(Tianamar, Tignamar, Tignamar)
Tigre	-43.16463	406	
Tijeral	-37.72938	64	
Tijeral	-40.62374	44	
Tilama	-32.07337	360	
Tilicura	-34.96173	162	
Tilicura	-34.85	78	
Tilo	-29.86725	1282	
Tiltil	-33.16687	529	
Tinguiririca	-34.28331	108	
Tinvuel	-38.62911	82	
Tipaume	-34.37502	313	
Tirinel	-39.8779	149	
Tirúa	-38.34303	19	
Tocadillo	-32.65793	2994	
Tocoihué	-42.30778	7	
Toconce	-22.27943	3126	
Todos Santos	-19.00542	3912	
Tolar	-28.40241	2664	
Toledo	-41.49544	7	
Toltén	-39.25233	7	
Tomeco	-37.00867	107	
Tomé	-31.6765	1348	
Tomes	-30.7191	835	
Tongoi	-42.11649	1	(Tongoi, Rio Tongoy, Tongoi, Río Tongoy)
Tongoy	-30.25734	4	
Topocalma	-34.12124	10	
Torca	-31.02086	1122	
Torcaza	-44.68832	451	
Torcido	-53.52607	8	
Torna Galeones	-39.89027	1	
Tornillo	-46.5237	206	
Toro	-28.41752	2710	
Toro	-42.58333	33	
Toro	-41.3315	105	
Toro	-41.0117	88	
Toro	-29.90604	2553	
Toro	-29.3337	4285	
Toroni	-19.52842	3906	
Torrecilla	-36.37621	84	
Torrente	-43.70282	175	
Torrentes	-42.73132	242	
Torrentón	-35.78549	129	
Torreón	-36.49707	90	
Torreón	-35.85341	105	
Torres	-41.30053	107	
Toscas	-38.15	459	
Totora	-36.24231	1132	
Totoral	-31.994	1272	
Totoral	-33.42133	16	
Totoral	-39.15883	372	
Trabunco	-38.66829	114	
Trafún	-39.97686	175	
Tragedia	-36.55815	1041	
Trahuilco	-40.34005	27	
Traidor	-41.77597	37	
Traidor	-41.4087	338	
Traiguén	-39.05951	27	
Traiguén	-38.32485	110	
Traiguén	-40.32531	14	(Traiguen, Estero Traiguén, Chirri, Chirri)
Traiguén	-38.83333	85	
Traiguenleufu	-39.80854	133	
Tráilanqui	-39.0376	204	
Trailefquén	-39.56509	213	
Traileufu	-39.21574	229	
Traillen	-39.45322	5	
Traitraico	-38.73333	51	
Traleufu	-39.74199	248	
Tralihué	-38.62575	1115	
Tranallaquín	-40.55935	19	
Trananahue	-38.04354	968	
Tranaquepe	-38.20261	8	
Tranca	-41.55	41	
Trancura	-39.3496	389	
Tranguil	-39.74677	202	
Trani	-40.37346	99	
Trañil	-42.66491	2	
Tranoi	-38.7427	96	
Tranque	-48.08948	98	
Tranquera	-47.60917	165	
Tranquilo	-51.89395	10	
Tranquilo	-47.46415	315	
Tranquilo	-46.6093	263	
Tranquilo	-43.71115	102	
Tránsito	-28.75259	792	(El Transito, Rio Transito, El Tránsito, Río del Tránsito)
Trapa Trapa	-37.54216	1477	
Trapén	-41.58959	59	(El Trapen, Estero El Trapén, Trapen, Trapén)
Travieso	-44.77337	280	
Trebol	-43.64215	34	
Trebulco	-33.66667	338	
Trecacura	-38.09109	130	
Treguaco	-40.61213	128	
Tregua Traiguén	-40.33306	7	
Trehuaco	-37.26487	40	
Treinta Ganchos	-38.30577	111	(Ganchos, Estero Los Ganchos, Estero Treinta Ganchos)
Trentren	-38.73333	37	
Tres Brazos	-53.27192	5	
Tres Pasos	-51.29072	27	
Tres Puentes	-53.11484	5	
Tres Quebradas	-31.47079	1463	
Tres Quebradas	-29.41963	2665	
Tres Vientos	-37.96258	464	
Tricahue	-35.36278	159	
Tricao	-37.24893	69	
Tricao	-36.81787	240	
Tricauco	-38.29979	112	
Tricauco	-37.21733	67	
Trilaleo	-37.10332	189	(Trilaleo, Trilaleo, Trilaleo)
Trilaleo	-37.1	276	
Trincahues	-35.7046	511	
Trinidad	-49.41596	17	
Trinidad	-34.39179	119	
Triunquilemu	-37.71754	134	
Troliguán	-42.47528	327	
Tromen	-40.36717	8	
Tromen	-38.70569	27	
Tromen	-37.90014	11	
Troncó	-33.97604	465	
Troncura	-37.88206	83	
Trongol	-37.55253	55	
Tronquilemo	-35.81667	240	
Troquen	-39.09119	157	
Trovoltrovolco	-38.35479	68	
Trubunleo	-37.38333	990	
Truchas	-36.73847	749	
Trueno	-38.58688	298	(El Trueno, Estero Trueno)
Trufquennilahue	-38.69196	1152	
Truftruf	-38.73333	108	
Truful	-39.85449	397	
Trufultruful	-38.85121	497	
Trufún	-40.48078	9	
Trumpulo	-38.99899	219	
Truncalemu	-34.68944	202	
Tubul	-37.23487	1	
Tucapel	-37.80892	49	
Tuco	-38.31667	155	
Tucuruma	-19.83587	4104	
Tué	-37.77556	552	(Otue, Estero Otué, Tue, Tué)
Tuetué	-38.71282	1055	
Tugo	-38.95	74	
Tulahuencito	-30.85225	856	
Tulán	-23.78032	2347	
Tulicune	-22.30456	3164	
Tumarcuicui	-38.08197	267	
Tumuntuco	-38.87953	122	
Tungui	-39.29501	221	
Tupungatito	-33.36832	2865	
Tupungato	-33.35137	3117	
Turbio	-48.77248	252	
Turbio	-45.35625	28	
Turbio	-44.30813	284	
Turbio	-43.3554	30	
Turbio	-39.30412	334	
Turbio	-31.03333	1808	
Turbio	-29.98273	804	
Turbio	-27.70833	2599	
Turbio	-27.7	3014	
Turbio	-45.10661	322	
Turbio	-45.95115	363	
Turra	-37.19038	108	
Tutucura	-35.31309	63	
Tutuvén	-35.97791	143	
Ullinco	-37.63518	65	
Ulmos	-39.13688	171	
Ulmuco	-40.80561	58	
Unión	-54.74167	55	
Universo	-42.09972	1163	
Upeo	-35.18498	435	
Uquika	-54.92917	3	
Uraco	-34.88697	19	
Uruque	-36.42564	77	
Uspallante	-44.96443	31	
Utalacata	-18.85883	3804	
Vacas Heladas	-29.90671	2536	
Valdés	-36.33901	1378	
Valdés	-32.88994	418	
Valdivia	-39.87769	16	(Valdivia, Valdivia)
Valdivia	-39.82495	0	
Valenzuela	-53.39585	25	
Valenzuela	-52.74091	6	
Valeriana	-29.05	4183	
Valeriano	-28.88586	1857	(Valeriana, Valeriano, Rio Valeriano, Valeriano, Río de Valeriano)
Valledor	-33.48333	531	
	-31.26807	1035	(Valle Hermoso, Valle Hermoso)
Valle Hermoso	-32.45	69	
Valle	-31.89757	985	
Valle	-34.11868	14	
Valle	-35.84532	1103	
Vallerenco	-38.4528	128	
Valverde	-41.40736	342	
Vaquería	-52.68756	3	
Vargas	-48.46245	273	
Vargas	-47.70029	21	
Veco	-18.82357	3946	
Veco	-19.05574	3695	
Veco	-43.96407	27	
Vedaco	-38.03333	180	(Pellehue, Estero Vedaco)
Veer	-54.44679	3	
Vega Honda	-36.16667	172	
Vegas Malas	-52.2179	236	
Velazquino	-34.66667	180	
Venado	-40.86911	131	
Venado	-40.36866	245	
Venado	-41.36997	157	
Venados	-39.46071	7	
Venegas	-35.67743	90	
Ventisquero	-48.37267	263	
Ventisquero	-48.2045	447	
Ventisquero	-48.10715	335	
Ventisquero	-47.54548	63	
Ventisquero	-44.38194	31	
Ventisquero	-41.98693	97	
Ventisquero	-41.98333	278	
Ventrenco	-38.48774	479	
Verde	-53.00547	9	
Verde	-52.60774	3	(Verde, Verde)
Verde	-46.38213	26	
Verde	-43.41005	61	
Verde	-40.71585	21	
Vergara	-37.49118	51	
Vergara	-35.13924	1773	
Vergara	-38.47318	854	
Verguico	-36.38758	117	
Vertena	-36.90219	174	
Vichuquén	-34.84269	7	
Viejo	-36.64685	101	
Vilama	-22.91723	2422	
Vilcún	-42.01953	18	(Luileu, Rio Vilcun, Vilcún)
Vilcún	-41.96667	3	
Vilcún	-38.67238	256	
Villagrán	-37.14471	610	(Burriqueces, Estero Villagran, Estero Villagrán)
Villa Hueso	-35.21667	194	
Villalón	-48.755	252	
Villatasmo	-42.46148	266	
Villuco	-37.38974	85	
Villucura	-38.12237	664	
Viloco	-39.06667	64	
Vilotregua	-37.86667	1261	
Virasoro	-52.63966	7	
Viviana	-45.35177	34	
Vizcachani	-18.37604	4279	
Vizcachas de Pulido	-28.11276	2142	
Vizcachas	-51.01667	86	(Vizcachas, Rio Vizcanchas, Vizcachas, Río Vizcanchas)
Vodudahué	-42.4834	90	(Bodudahue, Rio Vodudahue, Rio la Laja, Bodudahue, Río Vodudahué)
Voipire	-39.20851	195	
Volcán	-33.80668	1295	(El Volcan, Rio Volcan, El Volcán, Río Volcán)
Volcán	-37.46667	1413	
Volcán	-35.46225	1452	
Waag	-43.2	537	
Waddington	-33.00013	163	
Waddington	-33.00717	166	
Wickham	-53.32692	7	
Wilson	-53.79855	124	
Winchester	-44.58687	606	
Woodsend	-53.72146	7	
Yadquihue	-38.7	29	
Yaldad	-43.09417	10	
Yale	-41.74527	6	(Yale)
Yali	-33.76714	5	(Yali, Estero Yali)
Yeguas Muertas	-33.62756	2924	
Yelcho Chico	-43.24332	40	
Yelcho	-42.95602	0	(Diamante, Rio Yelcho, Yelcho)
Yeli	-43.51761	17	
Yenellenchico	-39.13333	13	
Yerbas Buenas	-34.39515	142	
Yesillo	-33.96034	1720	
Yeso	-33.75849	1599	
Yihuechozoy	-39.58563	313	
Yolque	-40.32372	160	
Yuco	-38.84812	47	
Yumbel	-37.12636	89	
Yunque	-31.99392	3153	
Yusto	-22.29675	3564	
Zahuelhue	-38.84927	504	
Zallel	-39.55528	1059	
Zambo	-41.80241	8	
Zamora	-50.85029	237	
Zamorano	-34.41443	178	(Zamorano)
Zancudo	-45.73063	166	
Zanja Honda	-50.98333	103	(Zanja Honda, Zanja Honda, Zanja Honda, Zanja Honda)
Zanjón	-33.4596	1787	
Zapal	-34.7249	194	
Zapata	-53.81667	181	
Zapata	-33.41411	199	
Zehuilauquén	-40.35168	86	
Zorras	-35.1574	2166	
Zorro	-32.52934	1802	
