= List of rivers of Chile =

This list of rivers of Chile includes all the major rivers of Chile. See each article for their tributaries, drainage areas, etc. Usually significant tributaries appear in this list, under the river into which they drain.

== Rivers by name ==
Following lists show the information of GeoNames ordered by names:

- List of rivers of Chile (A–C)
- List of rivers of Chile (D–O)
- List of rivers of Chile (P–Z)

== Rivers by region ==
The lists of rivers by region are:

- List of rivers of the Arica y Parinacota Region (approximately 34 rivers)
- List of rivers of the Tarapacá Region (approximately 44 rivers)
- List of rivers of the Antofagasta Region (approximately 41 rivers)
- List of rivers of the Atacama Region (approximately 61 rivers)
- List of rivers of the Coquimbo Region (approximately 121 rivers)
- List of rivers of the Valparaíso Region (approximately 174 rivers)
- List of rivers of the Santiago Metropolitan Region (approximately 211 rivers)
- List of rivers of the O'Higgins Region (approximately 156 rivers)
- List of rivers of the Maule Region (approximately 256 rivers)
- List of rivers of the Bío Bío Region (approximately 568 rivers)
- List of rivers of La Araucanía Region (approximately 662 rivers)
- List of rivers of Los Ríos Region (approximately 165 rivers)
- List of rivers of Los Lagos Region (approximately 755 rivers)
- List of rivers of the Aysén Region (approximately 297 rivers)
- List of rivers of the Magallanes Region (approximately 173 rivers)

== Information in the lists ==
This list contains:

1. Name of the stream, in Spanish
2. Coordinates are the latitude and longitude of the feature in ± decimal degrees, at the mouth of the stream
3. Link to a map including the Geonameid (a number which uniquely identifies a Geoname feature)
4. Feature Code explained in
5. Other names for the same feature, if any
6. Basin countries additional to Chile, if any

Among all the features recorded in the GeoNames database, Wikipedia has arbitrarily selected for these lists features named "Rio", "Rio", "Canal", "Arroyo", "Estero", "Riachuelo" and they must contain one of following Feature Codes (explained in ):

RPDS: rapids, a turbulent section of a stream associated with a steep, irregular stream bed
CHN: channel, the deepest part of a stream, bay, lagoon, or strait, through which the main current flows
CNLA: aqueduct, a conduit used to carry water
CNLB: canal bend, a conspicuously curved or bent section of a canal
CNLD: drainage canal, an artificial waterway carrying water away from a wetland or from drainage ditches
CNLI: irrigation canal, a canal which serves as a main conduit for irrigation water
CNLN: navigation canal(s), a watercourse constructed for navigation of vessels
CNLSB: underground irrigation canal(s), a gently inclined tunnel bringing water for irrigation from aquifers
CRKT: tidal creek(s) a meandering channel in a coastal wetland subject to bi-directional tidal currents
DTCH: ditch, a small artificial watercourse dug for draining or irrigating the land
DTCHI: irrigation ditch, a ditch which serves to distribute irrigation water
DTCHD: drainage ditch, a ditch which serves to drain the land
ESTY: estuary, a funnel-shaped stream mouth or embayment where fresh water mixes with sea water under tidal influences
FORD: ford, a shallow part of a stream which can be crossed on foot or by land vehicle
SBED: dry stream bed, a channel formerly containing the water of a stream
STM: stream, a body of running water moving to a lower level in a channel on land
STMA: anabranch, a diverging branch flowing out of a main stream and rejoining it downstream
STMB: stream bend, a conspicuously curved or bent segment of a stream
STMC: canalized stream, a stream that has been substantially ditched, diked, or straightened
STMD: distributary(-ies), a branch which flows away from the main stream, as in a delta or irrigation canal
STMH: headwaters, the source and upper part of a stream, including the upper drainage basin
STMI: intermittent stream
STMIX: section of intermittent stream
STMM: stream mouth(s), a place where a stream discharges into a lagoon, lake, or the sea
STMQ: abandoned watercourse, a former stream or distributary no longer carrying flowing water, but still evident due to lakes, wetland, topographic or vegetation patterns
STMS: streams, bodies of running water moving to a lower level in a channel on land
STMSB: lost river, a surface stream that disappears into an underground channel, or dries up in an arid area
STMX: section of stream
TNLC: canal tunnel, a tunnel through which a canal passes
WTRC: watercourse, a natural, well-defined channel produced by flowing water, or an artificial channel designed to carry flowing water
WTRH: waterhole(s), a natural hole, hollow, or small depression that contains water, used by man and animals, especially in arid areas

== Rivers by latitude ==
Note: The rivers are ordered by the latitude of their outflows into the ocean, lakes, other rivers or out of Chile respectively.

== Largest rivers by basin area ==
Note: The rivers are ordered by their drainage basin area within Chile.

Rivers with a basin area of more than 10,000 km²
Rank	Name	Basin area	Length
1	Loa River	33,570 km²	440 km
2	Baker River	26,726 km²	170 km
3	Bío-Bío River	24,264 km²	380 km
4	Maule River	20,600 km²	240 km
5	Bueno River	15,367 km²	130 km
6	Maipo River	15,304 km²	250 km
7	Pascua River	14,760 km²	62 km
8	Rapel River^{1}	13,695 km²	167 km
9	Imperial River	12.763 km²	55 km
10	Limarí River	11,800 km²	64 km
11	Aysén River	11,427 km²	26 km
12	Copiapó River	11,400 km²	162 km
13	Itata River	11,294 km²	140 km
14	Valdivia River^{2}	10,275 km²	140 km

Notes:

- ^{1}The length in the list is that of the tributary Tinguiririca River
- ^{2}The length in the list is the sum of Valdivia and Cruces River. The length of the proper Valdivia River is 15 km.

== See also ==
- List of rivers of the Americas by coastline
