= Laguna del Maule (volcano) =

Volcanic field in the Andes mountain range, Chile

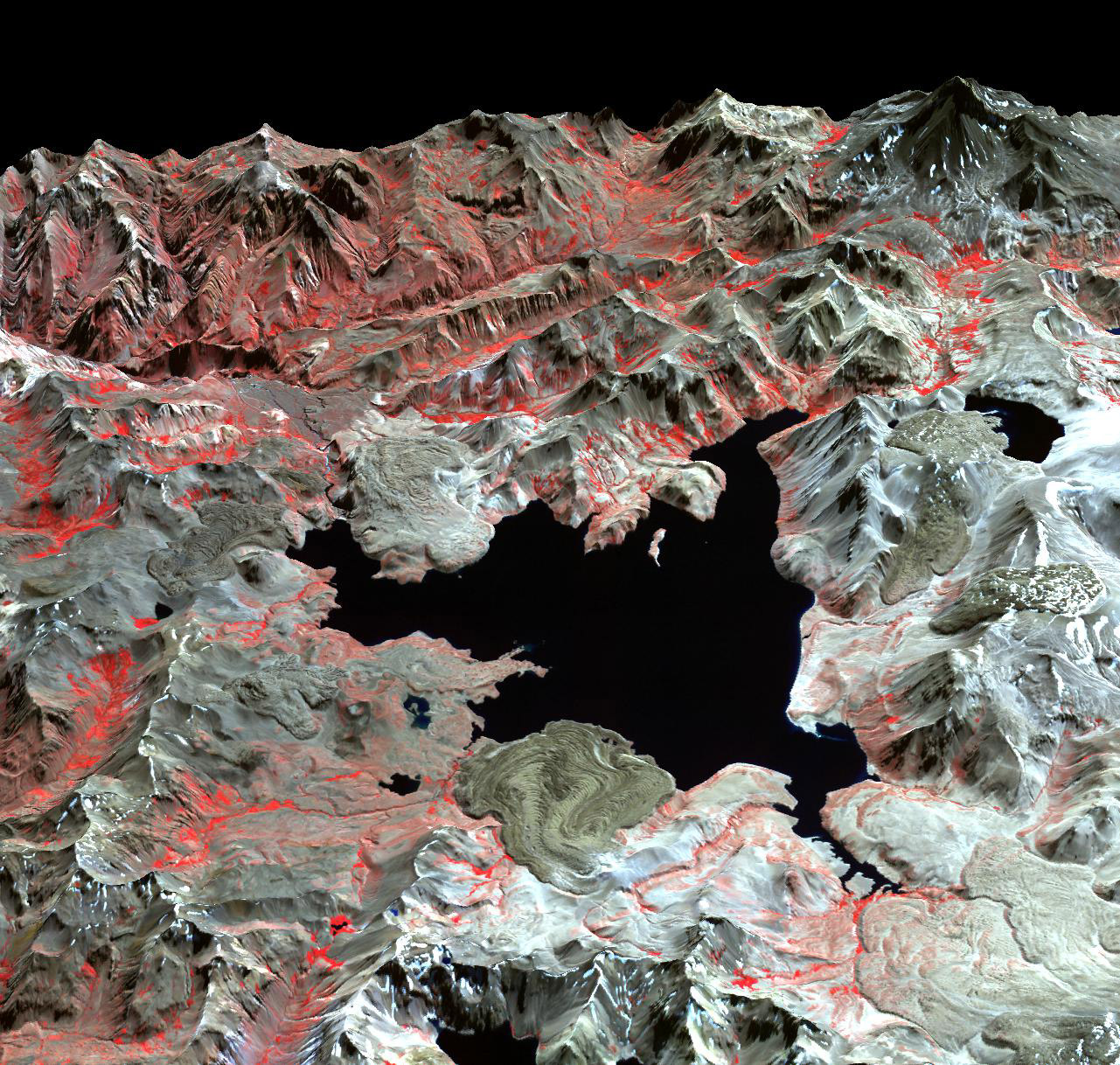
- False colour image of Laguna del Maule

Highest point
- Coordinates: 36°04′03″S 70°31′21″W

Geography
- Location within Chile
- Location: Maule Region, Chile
- Parent range: Andes

Geology
- Mountain type: Volcanic field
- Volcanic zone: Southern Volcanic Zone
- Last eruption: 800 ± 600

Laguna del Maule is a volcanic field in the Andes mountain range of Chile, close to, and partly overlapping, the Argentina–Chile border. The bulk of the volcanic field is in the Talca Province of Chile's Maule Region. It is a segment of the Southern Volcanic Zone, part of the Andean Volcanic Belt. The volcanic field covers an area of 500 km^{2} (190 sq mi) and features at least 130 volcanic vents. Volcanic activity has generated cones, lava domes, lava coulees and lava flows, which surround the Laguna del Maule lake. The field gets its name from the lake, which is also the source of the Maule River.

The field's volcanic activity began 1.5 million years ago during the Pleistocene epoch; such activity has continued into the postglacial and Holocene epoch after glaciers retreated from the area. Postglacial volcanic activity has included eruptions with simultaneous explosive and effusive components, as well as eruptions with only one component. In the postglacial era, volcanic activity has increased at Laguna del Maule, with the volcanic field rapidly inflating during the Holocene. Three major caldera-forming eruptions took place in the volcanic field prior to the last glacial period. The most recent eruptions in the volcanic field took place 2,500 ± 700, 1,400 ± 600 and 800 ± 600 years ago and generated lava flows; today geothermal phenomena occur at Laguna del Maule. Volcanic rocks in the field include basalt, andesite, dacite and rhyolite; the latter along with rhyodacite makes up most of the Holocene rocks. In pre-Columbian times, the field was a regionally important source of obsidian.

Between 2004 and 2007, ground inflation began in the volcanic field, indicating the intrusion of a sill (Note: A sill is a tabular intrusion of magma that is embedded between stacked layers of rock.) beneath it. The rate of inflation is faster than those measured on other inflating volcanoes such as Uturunku in Bolivia and Yellowstone Caldera in the United States and has been accompanied by anomalies in soil gas emission and seismic activity. This pattern has created concern about the potential for impending large-scale eruptive activity.

== Geography and structure ==
The Laguna del Maule volcanic field straddles the Chilean–Argentine frontier; most of the complex lies on the Chilean side. The locality belongs to the Maule Region, of Talca Province in the Andes mountain range; it is close to the confluence of the Maule and Campanario rivers in the Maule valley. The city of Talca lies about 140–150 km (87–93 mi) west. The Argentine section of the field is in the Mendoza and Neuquén provinces, and the city of Malargüe is located about 140 km (87 mi) east from the volcanic field. The seasonal Highway 115 passes through the northern part of the volcanic field. The Paso Pehuenche mountain pass few kilometres northeast of the lake connects Argentina and Chile; the Chilean customs are at the outlet of the lake. Tourists and fishermen come to the lake during summer, and the crew of the Laguna del Maule dam remains there year-round. Otherwise, the region is sparsely inhabited and economic activity is limited to oil prospecting, pastures and tourism; the closest towns are La Mina and Los Cipreses over 20 km (12 mi) northwest of Laguna del Maule.

The Laguna del Maule volcanic field covers a surface area of 500 km^{2} (190 sq mi) and contains at least 130 volcanic vents including cones, lava domes, lava flows, and shield volcanoes; 36 silicic coulees and lava domes surround the lake. Over 100 km^{2} (39 sq mi) of the field is covered by these volcanic rocks. The volcanic field lies at an average height of 2,400 m (7,900 ft), and some summits around Laguna del Maule reach altitudes of 3,900 m (12,800 ft). Volcanic ash and pumice produced by the eruptions has been found over 20 km (12 mi) away in Argentina. A number of Quaternary volcanic systems of various ages surround Laguna del Maule lake, including about 14 shield volcanoes and stratovolcanoes that have been degraded by glaciation. The topography in the area is often steep.

Among the structures in the volcanic field, the Domo del Maule lava dome is of rhyolitic composition and generated a lava flow to the north that dammed the Laguna del Maule. This lava flow is joined by other lava flows from the Crater Negro, a small cone in the southwest sector of the volcanic field; the lavas of this cone are andesitic and basaltic. Loma de Los Espejos is a large lava flow of acidic rocks that is 4 km (2.5 mi) long in the northern sector of the volcanic field, close to the outlet of Laguna del Maule. It consists of two lobes with a volume of about 0.82 km^{3} (0.20 cu mi) and contains obsidian and vitrophyre. Crystals within the flow reflect the sunlight. The well-preserved Colada de las Nieblas lava flow is in the extreme southwest sector of the volcanic field and originates at a tuff cone. This lava flow is 300 m (980 ft) thick, varying from 5 km (3.1 mi) to 6 km (3.7 mi) in length, and is about 3 km (1.9 mi) wide. The Barrancas centre has a volume of 5.5 km^{3} (1.3 cu mi) and reaches an elevation of 3,092 m (10,144 ft).

Past glaciation of this part of the Andes left traces in adjacent valleys, such as their U-shaped or trench-shaped outline. The older volcanics of Laguna del Maule have been disproportionately eroded by glacial action. Slopes around Laguna del Maule lake are covered by colluvium (Note: Sediment deposits at the foot of slopes, which form when material is transported by gravity or non-channeled movements.) including talus.

The Laguna del Maule lake lies on the crest of the Andes, within a depression with a diameter of 20 km (12 mi). The lake has a depth of 50 m (160 ft) and covers a surface of 54 km^{2} (21 sq mi); the surface is at an altitude of 2,160 m (7,090 ft). The name of the volcanic field comes from the lake, which contains several islets. On the lakefloor are slump scars, pits that may be pockmarks, and a basin in the northern lake sector that may be the crater of an early Holocene Plinian eruption. Terraces around the lake indicate that water levels have fluctuated in the past; an eruption dated between 19,000 ± 700 and 23,300 ± 400 years ago dammed the lake 200 m (660 ft) higher than its present level. When the dam broke 9,400 years ago, a lake outburst flood occurred that released 12 km^{3} (2.9 cu mi) of water and left traces, such as scour, in the down-valley gorge. Benches and beach bars developed during this lake level rise, which has left a shoreline around Laguna del Maule lake. Other raised shorelines may be due to deformation of the volcanic edifice. The lake is regulated by a dam at the outlet; it was built in 1950 and completed in 1957 and caused a slight expansion of the lake's area. Laguna del Maule is Chile's fourth-largest reservoir with a capacity of 0.850 cubic kilometres (0.204 cu mi). Additionally, tephra fallout such as from the 1932 Quizapu eruption has impacted the lake through the Holocene and affected life in the lake waters.

Besides Laguna del Maule, there are other lakes in the field, on both its Chilean and Argentine side. Laguna Sin Puerto is in the northwest sector of the field, while Laguna Turbia and Laguna El Piojo are in the southwest sector of the field, Laguna Cari Launa in the northeastern sector of the field, and Laguna Fea in the south at 2,492 m (8,176 ft) elevation and Laguna Negra lake both on the Argentine side. Laguna Fea is dammed by a pumice dam and currently lacks an outlet. The Laguna Sin Salida ("lake without exit"; so named because it lacks a river running out of it) is in the northeastern sector of the volcanic field and it formed within a glacial cirque. The Andean drainage divide runs across the volcanic field; most of it lies west of the divide and drains into the Maule River, partially through its tributary Melado. The Maule river originates in the field and the Pehuenche and Barrancas Rivers have their headwaters in the volcanic field as well.

== Geology ==
Subduction of the eastern part of the Nazca plate beneath the western margin of the South American plate occurs at a rate of about 74 ± 2 mm/a (2.913 ± 0.079 in/year). This subduction process is responsible for growth of the Chilean Andes, and volcanic and geothermal manifestations such as the 1960 Valdivia earthquake and the 2010 Chile earthquake, as well as Laguna del Maule, which formed 25 km (16 mi) behind the volcanic arc.

A phase of strong volcanic activity began in the Andes 25 million years ago, probably due to increased convergence rates of the Nazca and South America plates over the past 28 million years. It is likely that this phase has persisted without interruption until today.

The subduction of the Nazca plate beneath the South American plate has formed a volcanic arc about 4,000 km (2,500 mi) long, which is subdivided into several segments distinguished by varying angles of subduction. The part of the volcanic belt named the Southern Volcanic Zone contains at least 60 volcanoes with historical activity and three major caldera systems. Major volcanoes of the Southern Volcanic Zone include from north to south: Maipo, Cerro Azul, Calabozos, Tatara-San Pedro, Laguna del Maule, Antuco, Villarrica, Puyehue-Cordón Caulle, Osorno, and Chaitén. Laguna del Maule is located within a segment known as the Transitional Southern Volcanic Zone, 330 km (210 mi) west of the Peru–Chile Trench and 25 km (16 mi) behind the main arc. Volcanoes in this segment are typically located on basement blocks that have been uplifted between extensional basins.

In the area of Laguna del Maule, the subducting Nazca plate reaches a depth of 130 km (81 mi) and is 37 million years old. During the Late Miocene, the convergence rate was higher than today and the Malargüe fold belt formed east of the main chain in response. The Moho is found at depths of 40–50 km (25–31 mi) beneath the volcanic field.

=== Local ===
The Campanario Formation is 15.3 to 7 million years old and forms much of the basement in the Laguna del Maule area; this geological formation contains andesitic-dacitic ignimbrites (Note: Ignimbrites are solidified tuffs that consist of fragments of crystals and rocks, encased within glass shards.) and tuffs with later dacitic dykes that were emplaced 3.6–2.0 million years ago. An older unit, of Jurassic–Cretaceous age, crops out northwest of the volcanic field. Other units include an Oligocene–Miocene group of lacustrine and fluvial formations named Cura-Mallín, and another intermediary formation named Trapa-Trapa, which is of volcanic origin and between 19 and 10 million years old. Remnants of Quaternary ignimbrites and Pliocene, early Quaternary volcanic centres, are also found around the field; they form the Cola del Zorro Formation, which is partly covered by the eruption products of Laguna del Maule. Glacial tills occur at the volcanic field.

There are several faults in the volcanic field, such as the Laguna Fea and Troncoso Faults in the southwest sector and Los Condores (also known as Río Maule)in the northwestern part. The Laguna Fea fault is a west-northwest trending normal fault that was identified during seismic surveys. The inactive Troncoso is alternatively described as a strike-slip or normal fault; (Note: A normal fault is an usually steep fault where the hanging wall is moving downward with respect to the footwall.) it runs along the Cajón Troncoso valley and separates distinct regimes of tectonic and volcanic activity within the Laguna del Maule volcanic field: They appear to delimit areas of magma accumulation underground. Faults have been imaged in lake sediments. Other north–south cutting faults are found within the Campanario Formation and the tectonic Las Loicas Trough is associated with Laguna del Maule and passes southeast of it. Some faults at Laguna del Maule may be linked to the northern termination of the Liquiñe-Ofqui Fault Zone, while others may relate to large-scale lineaments that cross the Andes.

Northeast of Laguna del Maule are several mountains that reach elevations exceeding 3 kilometres (1.9 mi); many of these are eroded volcanoes. Cerro Campanario is a 3,943 m (12,936 ft) high mafic (Note: A volcanic rock relatively rich in iron and magnesium, relative to silicium.) stratovolcano that was active 160,000–150,000 years ago. South of Laguna del Maule is the Varvarco volcanic field, while the Puelche volcanic field and the Pichi Trolon calderas are north and northeast of it, respectively; all were active in the Pleistocene. The volcanoes Nevado de Longaví, Tatara-San Pedro and the caldera Rio Colorado lie west of Laguna del Maule; the latter two may be part of a volcano alignment with Laguna del Maule. The local volcanoes are in a segment of the crust where the Wadati–Benioff zone is 90 km (56 mi) deep. More distant are the Calabozos caldera and a late Pleistocene system with domes and flows south of Cerro San Francisquito, which are both silicic volcanic systems. The activity of Tatara-San Pedro and Laguna del Maule with the presence of rhyolite may be influenced by the subduction of the Mocha fracture zone, which projects in the direction of these volcanic centres. Nearby are the Risco Bayo and Huemul plutons, (Note: Plutons are intrusions made of volcanic rocks.) which are about 6.2 million years old and may have formed through volcanism similar to that of Laguna del Maule.

=== Composition of erupted rocks ===
Laguna del Maule has erupted andesite, basaltic andesite, basalt, dacite, rhyodacite and rhyolite, the andesites and basaltic andesites define a rock suite with medium potassium contents. In the Loma de Los Espejos rocks a SiO_{2} content of 75.6–76.7% by weight has been noted. Zircon composition data indicate that the magmatic system has evolved over time: After deglaciation, the composition of Laguna del Maule volcanic rocks has grown more silicic; since 19,000 years ago, andesite eruptions have been restricted to the edges of the volcanic field, consistent with the maturation of a silicic magmatic system. The postglacial phase of activity has generated about 6.4 km^{3} (1.5 cu mi) of rhyolite and 1.0 km^{3} (0.2 cu mi) of rhyodacite, an unusual composition for a postglacial volcano of the Andes. Of the more than 350 km^{3} (84 cu mi) of volcanic rock in the Laguna del Maule field, about 40 km^{3} (9.6 cu mi) were emplaced postglacially. Laguna del Maule magmas contain large amounts of water and carbon dioxide; postglacial magmas on average consist of 5–6% water by weight with some variation between individual eruptions. Flushing of the magma with carbon dioxide may be important for starting eruptions.

Several stratigraphic units (Note: Stratigraphic units are three-dimensional traceable units of rock.) have been distinguished at the volcanic field, including the Valley unit exposed in the Maule valley and the Lake unit found around the lake. The Valley unit's rocks are basaltic andesite. Plagioclase and, in lesser measure, clinopyroxene and olivine form its phenocrysts. The Lake unit is mostly postglacial and includes glassy rhyolite, which is poor in crystals. Phenocrysts in the postglacial rocks are biotite, plagioclase and quartz. Granitic xenoliths and mafic rocks occur as discrete rock fragments in the rhyolitic units erupted by the rdm eruption. Microlites in the Lake unit rocks include biotite, plagioclase and spinel. Variable vesicular texture has been noted on rocks erupted during different eruptions. Temperatures of the postglacial magmas have been estimated at 820–950 °C (1,510–1,740 °F). The Holocene rhyolites are glassy and contain few crystals. Hydrothermal alteration has been reported at various sites such as La Zorra, generating alunite, calcite, halite, illite, jarosite, kaolinite, montmorillonite, opal, quartz, pyrite, smectite, sulfur, travertine and zeolite. At La Zorra there are occurrences of actinolite, apatite, augite, calcite, chlorite, hypersthene, ilmenite, magnetite, phlogopite, pyrite, pyroxene, quartz, thorite, titanite and zircon.

The postglacial rocks are composed of similar elements. High aluminium (Ai) and low titanium (Ti) are present in the basaltic andesite and basalt, a typical pattern for basic rocks in zones where plates converge. The rocks overall belong to the calc-alkaline series, although some iron-rich rocks have been attributed to the tholeiitic series. Strontium (Sr) isotope ratios have been compared to the ones of Tronador volcano; additional compositional similarity is found to other volcanoes close to Laguna del Maule such as Cerro Azul and Calabozos. Laguna del Maule stands out for the frequency of rhyolitic rocks, compared to volcanoes farther south in the chain. There are compositional trends in the region of the volcanic arc between 33° and 42°; more northerly volcanoes are more andesitic in composition while to the south basalts are more frequent.

=== Magma genesis ===
The postglacial activity appears to originate from a shallow silicic magma chamber beneath the caldera. Research published in 2017 by Anderson et al. indicates that this system is somewhat heterogeneous with distinct compositions of magmas erupted in the northwesterly and southeasterly parts of the volcanic field. The early post-glacial rhyodacites contain mafic inclusions, and implying that mafic lavas exist but do not reach the surface. From Sr isotope ratios it has been inferred that the magma is of deep origin, and the rare-earth element composition shows no evidence of crustal contamination. Neodymium (Nd) and Sr isotope ratios indicate all rocks are derived from the same parent source, with the rhyolites forming by fractional crystallization of the basic magma, similar to the postulated origins of rocks from the Central Volcanic Zone. Partial melting may also be the source of the rhyolites. Overall the environment where the rocks formed appears to be an oxidized 760–850 °C (1,400–1,560 °F) hot system that formed over 100,000 to 200,000 years, and was influenced by the injection of basaltic magma. The rhyolitic melts may originate in a crystal rich mush beneath the volcanic field and probably in at least two magma chambers. The magma remains in the chamber for days or weeks before erupting. A minimum long-term magma supply rate of 0.0005 km^{3}/a (0.00012 mi^{3}/a) has been estimated, with a rate of 0.0023 km^{3}/a (0.00055 mi^{3}/a) during the past 20,000 years.

== Obsidian and iron oxide-apatite ==
In pre-Columbian times, (Note: Possibly going back 9,000 years.) Laguna del Maule was an important source of obsidian for the region, on both sides of the Andes. Finds have been made from the Pacific Ocean to Mendoza, 400 km (250 mi) away, as well as at archaeological sites of Neuquén Province. Obsidian forms sharp edges and was used by ancient societies for the production of projectiles as well as cutting instruments. In South America, obsidian was traded over large distances. Obsidian has been found in the Arroyo El Pehuenche, Laguna Negra and Laguna del Maule localities. These sites yield obsidians with varying properties, from large blocks at Laguna del Maule to smaller pebbles probably carried by water at Arroyo El Pehuenche. Another scheme has a Laguna del Maule 1 source at Laguna Fea and Laguna Negra and a Laguna del Maule 2 source on the Barrancas river.

An occurrence of iron oxide (magnetite)-apatite ores (IOA) has been found at La Zorra volcano and is named Vetas de Maule ("Veins of Maule"). It features massive magnetite blocks, magnetite grains and veins and breccias; the dimensions of the magnetite occurrences range from tens of metres to few centimetres. IOA-type deposits are important iron resources and form in volcanoes, either through magmatic or hydrothermal processes. The IOA deposit at Laguna del Maule is one of the youngest in the world, being less than one million years old. It formed presumably through hydrothermal processes, about 120,000 years after the volcano was emplaced.

== Climate and vegetation ==
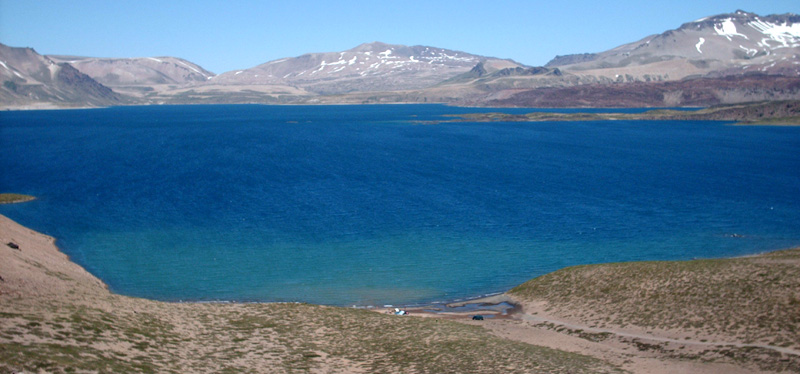
Snowy peaks and barren landscapes surrounding the Laguna del Maule, the crater lake of the volcano with the same name

Laguna del Maule lies at the interface between a semi-arid, temperate climate and a colder montane climate. It has a tundra climate, with maximum temperatures of 14.1 °C (57.4 °F) in January and minimum of −4.6 °C (23.7 °F) in July. Annual precipitation reaches about 1,700 mm/a (67 in/year); precipitation related to cold fronts falls during autumn and winter, although occasional summer storms also contribute to rainfall. Laguna del Maule is subject to the rain shadow effect of mountains farther west, which is why the numerous summits more than 3,000 m (9,800 ft) high around the lake are not glaciated. Most of the lake water comes from snowmelt; for much of the year the landscape around the lake is covered with snow and storms and snowfall frequently impede traffic at the lake. Winds frequently blow sand and pumice.

The area of Laguna del Maule was glaciated during the last glacial period. A glacial maximum occurred between 25,600 ± 1,200 and 23,300 ± 600 years ago, during which 80 km-wide (50 mi) ice cap covered the volcano and the surrounding valleys. There are uncertainties about when the glaciers retreated, but radiocarbon dating suggests that deglaciation took place 17,000 years ago, synchronously to the rest of the Americas. The glaciation has left moraines and terraces in the area, with undulating hills lying close to the outlet of the lake. Poorly developed moraines with the appearance of tiny hills lie downstream of Laguna del Maule, and form small hills around the lake rising about 10–20 m (33–66 ft) above the lake level. Other climate changes in the Holocene such as the Little Ice Age are recorded from sediments in Laguna del Maule, such as a humid period in the 15th to 19th centuries and drought during the early and middle Holocene. Since the 2000s-2010s, a long drought has caused a decline in the level and surface area of Laguna del Maule; the lake has shrunk by almost 10 per cent between 1984 and 2020.

The landscape around Laguna del Maule is mostly desertic without trees. Vegetation around Laguna del Maule is principally formed by bunchgrass, cushion plants and sub-shrubs; at higher altitudes vegetation is more scattered. A richer vegetation is found in valley floors, and was historically used for grazing. The rocks around Laguna del Maule host a plant named Leucheria graui, which has not been found elsewhere. The unfavourable terrain and climate are responsible for the desert-like landscape.

== Eruptive history ==
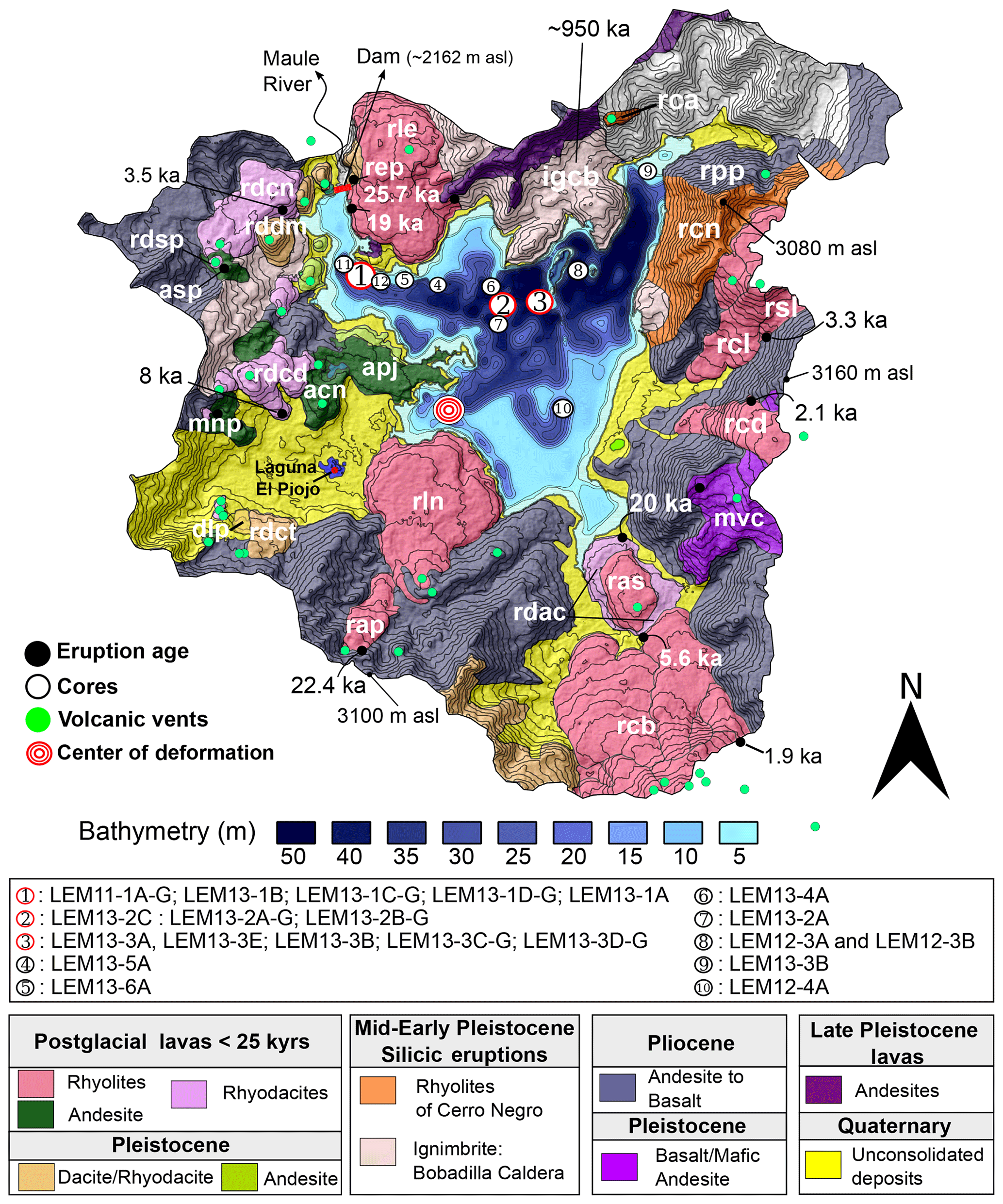
Geological map of the surroundings of Laguna del Maule lake

Laguna del Maule has been active since 1.5 million years ago, with field-wide activity established by about 900,000 years ago. Its average magma volcanic output rate has been estimated to be 200,000 m^{3}/a (7,100,000 ft^{3}/a)—comparable to other volcanic arc systems. Eruptions occur about every 1,000 years and it has been inferred that eruptions lasted between 100 and more than 3,000 days. Eruptions include both caldera-forming events and eruptions that did not leave a caldera. Most Pleistocene centres are found west of the lake.

Three caldera-forming events have occurred during the system's lifespan. The first took place 1.5 million years ago and produced the dacitic Laguna Sin Puerto ignimbrite, which is exposed northwest of Laguna del Maule lake. Between the two eruptions, about nine stratovolcanoes formed at Laguna del Maule. The largest occurred between 990,000 and 950,000 years ago and produced the Bobadilla caldera and a rhyodacitic ignimbrite, also known as the Cajones de Bobadilla ignimbrite. This ignimbrite reaches a thickness of 500 m (1,600 ft) and borders Laguna del Maule lake in the north, extending about 13 km (8.1 mi) away from it. The Bobadilla caldera is centred beneath the northern shore of Laguna del Maule, and has dimensions of 12 km × 8 km (7 mi × 5 mi). The third took place 336,000 years ago and produced the welded Cordon Constanza ignimbrite.

Eruptions before and during the last glaciation
Date	Name	Location	Notes and sources
2.5-1.5 million years ago	Volcán Filume	West of the lake	Deeply eroded stratovolcano.
2-1 million years ago?	Paso Guanaco	Northeast of the lake	Andesitic formation.
1.5-1.0 million years ago	Volcán Laguna Fea	South of Laguna Fea	Deeply eroded stratovolcano.
1.5-1.0 million years ago	Cerro Bayo	East of Paso Pehuenche	Deeply eroded stratovolcano.
1,324,000 ± 20,000 years ago	Volcán Botacura	West and northwest of the outlet	Part of a triplet of stratovolcanoes.
1,290,000 ± 13,000 years ago	Volcán Aguirre	West and northwest of the outlet	Part of a triplet of stratovolcanoes.
1,037,000-914,000 years ago	Volcán Ñirales	Western margin of the volcanic field	Part of a triplet of stratovolcanoes.
1,013,000 ± 70,000 years ago	Volcán La Zorra	Northeast of the lake	Erupted andesite, which contains iron oxide-apatite deposits.
950,000-712,000 years ago	Cajon Atravesado	North of the lake	Erupted rhyolite.
898,000 ± 20,000 years ago	Volcán Munizaga	At Paso Pehuenche	Erupted basalt and andesite.
881,000 ± 73,000 years ago	Lo Aguirre rhyodacite	Rio Maule valley	Lava dome.
429,000 ± 8,000 years ago	Volcán El Zorro	Northwest of the outlet	Stratovolcano.
About 243,000 years ago	Cerro San Pedro	Northwest edge of the field	Stratovolcano.
188,000-83,000 years ago	Volcán Pellado	Northwest edge of the field	Stratovolcano.
468,000–447,000 years ago	Cerro Negro	In the northeastern parts of the field	Erupted rhyodacite.
203,000 years ago	Arroyo Cabeceras de Troncoso	Northwest of Laguna del Maule lake	Erupted rhyodacite.
240,000 ± 50,000 to 200,000 ± 70,000 years ago	Valley Unit	n/a	Basic rocks of a volume of 5 km^{3} (1.2 cu mi), which in the Maule valley outcrops appear as lava flows thinning to the top.
100,000 ± 20,000 to 170,000 ± 20,000 years ago	n/a	Northwest of the field	Basalt pyroclastic cones and lava flows, dated from two samples.
154,000 years ago	Bobadilla Chica	North of the lake	Basaltic vent with lava north of the lake.
152,000 years ago	Volcan de la Calle	Straddling the Chile–Argentina border in the eastern sector	Andesitic vent and lava.
114,000 years ago	Domo del Maule	Northeast of Laguna del Maule (Note: 36°1′45″S 70°34′35″W)	Made of rhyodacite.
63,000–62,000 years ago	El Candado	Near the outlet of Laguna del Maule (Note: 36°0′45″S 70°33′40″W)	Made of basalt.
38,000 ± 29,000 years	n/a	East of the outlet	Made of rhyolite.
27,000–26,000 years	Arroyo Los Mellicos	West of the dam	Andesites.

The 36 rhyodacitic lava domes and flows which surround the lake were erupted from about 24 individual vents. The eruptions began 25,000 years ago, after the onset of deglaciation, and continued until the last such eruption approximately 2,000 years ago. Two pulses of volcanism occurred at Laguna del Maule after deglaciation, the first 22,500–19,000 years ago and the second in the middle-late Holocene. A first, large Plinian eruption (unit rdm) formed the rhyolite of Laguna del Maule measuring 20 km^{3} (4.8 mi^{3}) from a vent presumably located below the northern part of the lake.

Early post-glacial eruptions
Date	Name	Location	Notes and sources
after 24,000 years ago	n/a	Western coast of Laguna del Maule	Silicic volcanic units erupted include these young andesites.
21,000 years ago	Arroyo de la Calle	Southeast of Laguna del Maule	Rhyodacite.
19,000 years ago. Another proposed date is 23,000 years ago.	Loma de Los Espejos	Northern part of the field (Note: 36°0′0″S 70°32′0″W)	Unit rle, in the northern part of the field. It dammed the Maule River and thus increased the size of the lake.
17,000 years ago	n/a	Eastern part of the field.	Unit rdm, a large eruption which might have evacuated the entire magmatic system. Subsequent eruptions were of smaller volume and their rhyolites lack mafic components.

The Cerro Barrancas (Note: 36°10′0″S 70°27′0″W) centre became active circa 14,500 ± 1,500 years before present and was the main site of volcanic activity between 14,500 and about 8,000 years ago. After that point activity shifted and the volume output increased; the subsequent units have a volume of 4.8 km^{3} (1.2 cu mi). These two phases of volcanic activity occurred within 9,000 years of each other and the magmas involved may have been sourced from different magma reservoirs.

Late post-glacial eruptions
Date	Name	Location	Notes and sources
7,000 years ago. The unit rcb might be a compound unit of various ages ranging between 14,500 and 1,900 years old. Other proposed dates are 6,400 and 3,900 years ago.	Cerro Barrancas	Southeastern part of the field	Unit rcb. Tephra and pyroclastic emissions are among the largest of the volcanic field including an associated 15 km (9.3 mi) – 13 km (8.1 mi) long pyroclastic flow that filled a pre-existing valley, forming the Pampa del Rayo. Straddles the border between Argentina and Chile. Unusually for Laguna del Maule, some of its rocks have been hydrothermally altered.
3,300–3,500 years ago. 14,500 years ago is another proposed date.	Cari Launa	Northeastern part of the field (Note: 36°3′0″S 70°25′0″W)	Rhyolitic Unit rcl. Is in part flooded by the Cari Launa lake. Straddles the border between Argentina and Chile.
2,200–2,000 years ago	Colada Divisoria	Eastern part of the field	Rhyolitic unit rcd. Straddles the border between Argentina and Chile.
2,000 years ago	Colada Las Nieblas	Southwest part of the field (Note: 36°7′0″S 70°32′0″W)	Rhyolitic unit rln.

Undated postglacial units are andesitic Crater Negro (Note: 36°4′10″S 70°32′0″W) scoria cone and lava flow just west of Laguna del Maule, andesitic Playa Oriental on the southeastern shore of Laguna del Maule, rhyolitic Arroyo de Sepulveda at Laguna del Maule and rhyodacitic Colada Dendriforme (unit rcd) in the western part of the field. This rhyolitic flare-up is unprecedented the history of the volcanic field, and it is the largest such event in the southern Andes and on a global scale only the Mono-Inyo Craters and Taupō rival it. It took place in two stages, a first early after deglaciation and a second during the Holocene, which featured magmas with distinct composition. Post-glacial activity gave rise to more than 39 vents, which, compared to the pre-glacial volcanism, are concentrated around Laguna del Maule.

Three mafic volcanic vents named Arroyo Cabeceras de Troncoso, Crater 2657 and Hoyo Colorado are also considered postglacial. The former two are andesitic, while the latter is a pyroclastic cone. Mafic volcanism appears to have decreased after glacial times at Laguna del Maule, and the post-glacial volcanism has a mainly silicic composition. The magma chamber acts as a trap for mafic magma, preventing it from rising to the surface and thus explaining the absence of postglacial mafic volcanism. Only andesites and rhyodacites can bypass the rhyolites, and only in the western half of the field, away from the rhyolitic vents.

=== Explosive eruptions and far-field effects ===
Explosive activity including ash and pumice has accompanied a number of the postglacial eruptions; the largest is associated with Los Espejos and has been dated to 23,000 years ago. The deposit of this Plinian eruption reaches 4 m (13 ft) of thickness at a distance of 40 km (25 mi). White ash and pumice form layered deposits east of the Loma de Los Espejos; another explosive eruption is linked to the Barrancas centre which emplaced block and ash flows 13 kilometres (8.1 mi) long. Other such explosive events have been dated at 7,000, 4,000 and 3,200 years ago by radiocarbon dating. About three Plinian eruptions and three smaller explosive eruptions have been identified at Laguna del Maule; most of them took place between 7,000 and 3,000 years ago. In total, there are about 30 known fall units. It has been estimated that the ash and pumice deposits have a volume comparable with that of the lava flows.

Tephra deposits from Laguna del Maule occur in Argentine territory east of the volcano. A tephra layer in the Argentine Caverna de las Brujas cave dated 7,780 ± 600 years ago has been tentatively linked to Laguna del Maule, and another with a thickness of 80 cm (31 in) that is 65 km (40 mi) away from Laguna del Maule is dated 765 ± 200 years ago and appears to coincide with a time with no archaeological findings in the high cordillera. Other tephras that possibly were erupted at Laguna del Maule have been found in Argentinian archaeological sites, one 7,195 ± 200 years ago at El Manzano and another 2,580 ± 250 to 3,060 ± 300 years old at Cañada de Cachi. The El Manzano tephra reaches a thickness of 3 m (9.8 ft) about 60 km (37 mi) away from Laguna del Maule and would have had a severe impact on Holocene human communities south of Mendoza. However, there is no evidence for long-term depopulation of affected regions after eruptions.

=== Most recent activity and geothermal system ===
The most recent dates for eruptions are ages of 2,500 ± 700, 1,400 ± 600 and 800 ± 600 years for rhyolitic lava flows, with the last eruption forming the Las Nieblas flow. No eruptions have occurred during historical time, but petroglyphs in Valle Hermoso may depict volcanic activity at Laguna del Maule.

Laguna del Maule is geothermally active, featuring bubbling pools, fumaroles and hot springs. Temperatures in these systems range between 93–120 °C (199–248 °F). There is no degassing at the surface but emission of gas bubbles has been observed in Laguna del Maule lake and in Las Nieblas southwest of the lake, where a cold spring lies in a creek. In the Troncoso valley, CO_{2} emissions have killed small animals. Hot springs occur mainly west and northeast of Laguna del Maule: Guanaco and Cajon Grande northeast, Baños Campanario northwest and Baños Troncoso southwest of the lake. The Baños del Maule hot springs are now submerged below the lake. The Baños Campanario and Termas del Medano springs appear to form through a mixing of magmatic and precipitation water. The field has been evaluated as a potential source of geothermal energy. It and the neighbouring Tatara-San Pedro volcano form the so-called Mariposa geothermal system discovered in 2009, whose temperature has been estimated on the basis of gas chemistry to be 200–290 °C (392–554 °F) and which features fumaroles. One estimate puts the potential productivity of Laguna del Maule as an energy source at 50–200 MW (67,000–268,000 hp).

== Possible future eruptions ==
The Laguna del Maule volcanic system is undergoing strong deformation; uplift between 2004 and 2007 attracted the attention of the public and the global scientific community after it was detected by radar interferometry. Between January 2006 and January 2007 uplift of 18 cm/year (7.1 in/year) was measured, and uplift during 2012 was about 28 cm (11 in). Between 2007 and 2011 the uplift reached close to 1 m (3 ft 3 in). A change in the deformation pattern occurred in 2013 related to an earthquake swarm that January, with deformation slowing through to mid-2014 but with another increase between 2016 and at least 2020. Measurements in 2016 indicated that the uplift rate was 25 cm/year (9.8 in/year); uplift has continued into 2019 and the total deformation has reached 1.8 m (5 ft 11 in) to 2.5 m (8 ft 2 in). This uplift is one of the largest in all volcanoes that are not actively erupting; the strongest uplift worldwide was recorded between 1982 and 1984 at Campi Flegrei in Italy with an end change of 1.8 m (5 ft 11 in). Other actively deforming dormant volcanoes in the world are Lazufre in Chile, Santorini in Greece from 2011 to 2012, and Yellowstone Caldera in the United States at a rate of 1/7th that of Laguna del Maule. Another South American volcano, Uturunku in Bolivia has been inflating at a pace 1/10th that of Laguna del Maule's. There is evidence that earlier deformations occurred at Laguna del Maule, with the lake shores having risen by about 67 m (220 ft) during the Holocene possibly as a consequence of about 20 km^{3} (4.8 cu mi) entering the magmatic system and accumulating in the area of the Barrancas vents.

The present-day uplift is centred beneath the western segment of the ring of post-glacial lava domes, more specifically beneath the southwest sector of the lake. The source of the deformation has been traced to an inflation of a sill beneath the volcanic field that is 5.2 km (3.2 mi) deep with dimensions of 9.0 km × 5.3 km (5.6 mi × 3.3 mi). This sill has been inflating at an average pace of 31,000,000 ± 1,000,000 m^{3}/a (1.095×10^{9} ± 35,000,000 ft^{3}/a) between 2007 and 2010. The rate of volume change increased between 2011 and 2012. As of July 2016, 2,000,000 m^{3}/a (71,000,000 ft^{3}/a) of magma are estimated to enter the magma chamber. The average recharge rate required to explain the inflation is about 0.05 km^{3}/a (0.012 mi^{3}/a). This volume change is approximately 10 to 100 times as large as the field's long-term magma supply rate. Gravimetric analysis has indicated that between April 2013 and January 2014, approximately 0.044 km^{3} (0.011 cu mi) of magma intruded beneath the field. The presence of a sill is also supported by magnetotelluric measurements indicating conductivity anomalies at depths of 4–5 km (2.5–3.1 mi) beneath the western side of the volcanic field and at 8–9 km (5.0–5.6 mi) depth beneath its northern part. They show the existence of rhyolitic melt, but they do not show a magmatic system associated with the southeastern vents, leaving their magma supply route uncertain. The existence of a Bouguer gravity anomaly also indicates the presence of a low-density body 2–5 km (1.2–3.1 mi) beneath the volcano, and several low-density bodies below the lake, the eastern vents and the Barrancas centre. The latter may be a trace of magma left behind by the Holocene eruptions there. Seismic tomography has found a 450 km^{3} (110 cu mi) magma reservoir centered beneath the northwestern part of the lake, at 2–8 km (1.2–5.0 mi) depth. It may contain about 5% melt and has a heterogeneous structure with varying melt fractions in various parts of the reservoir. A reservoir of crystal-rich mush estimated as having a volume of 115 cubic kilometres (28 mi^{3}), with about 30 cubic kilometres (7.2 mi^{3}) of magma embedded within the mush, may have moved away from the old vents towards its present-day position. It is being resupplied by deeper, more crystal-poor magmas. The reservoirs are interpreted as andesitic-dacitic sponges with zones containing rhyolitic melt. In the deep crust, further magma systems may connect Laguna del Maule with Tatara-San Pedro volcano.

=== Seismicity ===
Strong seismic activity has accompanied the deformation at Laguna del Maule. Seismic swarms have been recorded above the depth of the deforming sill south of the ring of lava domes, particularly around Colada Las Nieblas. A magnitude 5.5 earthquake occurred south of the volcanic field in June 2012. A major volcano-tectonic earthquake swarm occurred in January 2013, possibly due to faults and underground liquids being pressurized by the intrusion of magma. Between 2011 and 2014, swarms of earthquakes occurred every two or three months and lasted from half an hour to three hours. Afterwards activity decreased until 2017 and increased again, with the most intense seismic episode taking place in June 2020. Most earthquake activity appears to be of volcano-tectonic origin, while fluid flow is less important; two intersecting lineaments on the southwest corner of the lake appear to be involved. The 2010 Maule earthquake, 230 km (140 mi) west of Laguna del Maule, did not affect the volcanic field; the rate of uplift remaining unchanged, while other measurements indicate a change in the uplift rates at that point. Although some shallow earthquakes have been interpreted as reflecting diking and faulting on the magma chamber, the pressure within the chamber appears to be insufficient to trigger a rupture all the way between the surface and the chamber and thus no eruption has occurred yet.

=== Potential mechanisms for the uplift ===
Several mechanisms have been proposed for the inflation, including the movement of magma underground, the injection of new magma, or the action of volcanic gases and volatiles which are released by the magma. Another proposal is that the inflation may be situated in a hydrothermal system; unless the Baños Campanario 15 km (9.3 mi) away are part of a hydrothermal system, there is little evidence that such a system exists at Laguna del Maule. Carbon dioxide (CO_{2}) anomalies, concentrated on the northern lakeshore, have been found around Laguna del Maule, in 2020 together with dead animals and discoloured soil; the anomalies are possibly triggered by the stress of the inflation activating old faults. These anomalies may indicate that the inflation is of mafic composition, as rhyolite only poorly dissolves CO_{2}. Gravity change measurements also show an interaction between magma source, faults and the hydrothermal system.

=== Hazards and management ===
This uplift has been a cause of concern in light of the history of explosive activity of the volcanic field, with 50 eruptions in the last 20,000 years; the current uplift may be the prelude of a large rhyolitic eruption. In particular, the scarce fumarolic activity implies that a large amount of gas is trapped within the magma reservoir, increasing the hazard of an explosive eruption. It is not clear if such an eruption would fit the pattern set by Holocene eruptions or would be a larger event. The prospect of renewed volcanic activity at Laguna del Maule has caused concern among the authorities and inhabitants of the region. A major eruption would have a serious impact on Argentina and Chile, including the formation of lava domes, lava flows, pyroclastic flows near the lake, ash fall at larger distances and lahars. The international road across Paso Pehuenche and air traffic in the region could be endangered by renewed eruptions. A break-out flood from Laguna Fea may endanger communities downstream.

Laguna del Maule is considered to be one of the most dangerous volcanoes of the Southern Andean volcanic belt, and is Argentina's third most dangerous volcano. In March 2013, the Southern Andean Volcano Observatory declared a "yellow alert" for the volcano in light of the deformation and earthquake activity, withdrew it in 2021 and reinstated it in 2023, lowered again at some point later and re-raised in 2025; the alert was supplemented afterwards with an "early" warning (withdrawn in January 2017) and in 2025 by a warning about anomalous carbon dioxide emissions on the southwestern side of the lake. The Argentine Servicio Geológico Minero and the Chilean National Geology and Mining Service monitor the volcano with a network of stations, and a bi-national volcanic hazard map has been published.
