= Calabozos =

Mountain in Chile

- Location within Chile

Highest point
- Elevation: 3,508 m (11,509 ft)
- Coordinates: 35°33′30″S 70°29′47″W

Geography
- Location: Central Chile
- Parent range: Andes

Geology
- Rock age: Pleistocene
- Mountain type: Caldera
- Volcanic belt: Andean Volcanic Belt
- Last eruption: Unknown

Calabozos is a caldera in central Chile's Maule Region (7th Region). Part of the Chilean Andes' volcanic segment, it is considered a member of the Southern Volcanic Zone (SVZ), one of the three distinct volcanic belts of South America. This most active section of the Andes runs along central Chile's western edge, and includes more than 70 of Chile's stratovolcanoes and volcanic fields. Calabozos lies in an extremely remote area of poorly glaciated mountains. The date of its last known eruption is not known with precision, though it took place during the Holocene.

Calabozos and the majority of the Andean volcanoes formed from the subduction of the oceanic Nazca Plate under the continental South American continental lithosphere. The caldera is in a transitional region between thick and thin lithosphere, and is probably supplied by a pool of andesitic and rhyolitic magma. It sits on a historic bed of volcanic and plutonic rock (rock formed within the Earth) that in turn sits on top of a layer of merged sedimentary and metamorphic rock.

Calabozos is responsible for the huge Loma Seca Tuff, a body of material 200 cubic kilometres (48 cu mi) to 500 cubic kilometres (120 cu mi) in volume. It accumulated over at least three eruptive periods, beginning 800,000 years ago (0.8 mya) and lasting until 150,000 years ago (0.15 mya).

The caldera's dimensions are 26 kilometres (16 mi) by 14 kilometres (8.7 mi), and it has an elevation of 3,508 metres (11,509 ft). Activity from the caldera has produced many other stratovolcanoes to form a complex volcano.

== Geography and structure ==
Calabozos lies in central Chile's Maule Region, near Curicó and Talca, on the western Andes. This is an area of poorly glaciated mountains that is not permanently populated. There are no roads, and it is only accessible via horse or on foot.

Calabozos is part of the South Volcanic Zone, which runs along the western edge of central Chile and extends south, jumping the border to continue its course in Argentina. This range includes at least nine caldera complexes, more than 70 of Chile's stratovolcanoes and volcanic fields that have been active in the Quaternary, and hundreds of minor eruptive centers. The South Volcanic Zone is the most volcanically active region in Chile, and produces around one eruption per year. Its largest historical eruption was at Quizapu Crater, located 15 kilometres (9 mi) to 20 kilometres (12 mi) from the north side of Cerro Azul's summit, and its most active volcanoes are Llaima and Villarrica.

Calabozos is a ring-shaped caldera 26 kilometres (16 mi) by 14 kilometres (9 mi) wide, with an elevation of 3,508 metres (11,509 ft). Volcanoes have been formed by eruptions in the crater. The largest, which is on the southern rim of the caldera, is the Holocene Cerro del Medio complex with an elevation of 3,508 metres (11,509 ft). It is made mainly of andesite and dacite, and has a volume of 20 cubic kilometres (5 cu mi) to 25 cubic kilometres (6 cu mi). On the southwestern edge several eruptions have created the Descabezado Chico volcano (elevation: 3,250 metres (10,663 ft)) which consists of four overlapping volcanic craters. The last eruption occurred during Holocene time, and produced a dacitic lava flow (2.5 cubic kilometres (1 cu mi) in volume) that extends for 30 kilometres (19 mi). Cerro Colorado, with an elevation of 2,928 metres (9,606 ft), forms another cone in the complex.

Towards the center of the caldera, hot springs including Cajon Los Calabozos and Baños de Llolli are present. The springs are as old as 0.3 mya, and may have formed directly after Calabozos's second eruption as a result of uplift caused by re-occurring activity in the caldera. The vents occur in two clusters, Colorado and Puesto Calabozos, and are located along the margin of a fault at the southwestern edge of the caldera. Hildreth et al. (1983) evaluated that Calabozos could potentially be useful for the harvesting of geothermal energy, and exploratory holes have been drilled.

== Geology ==
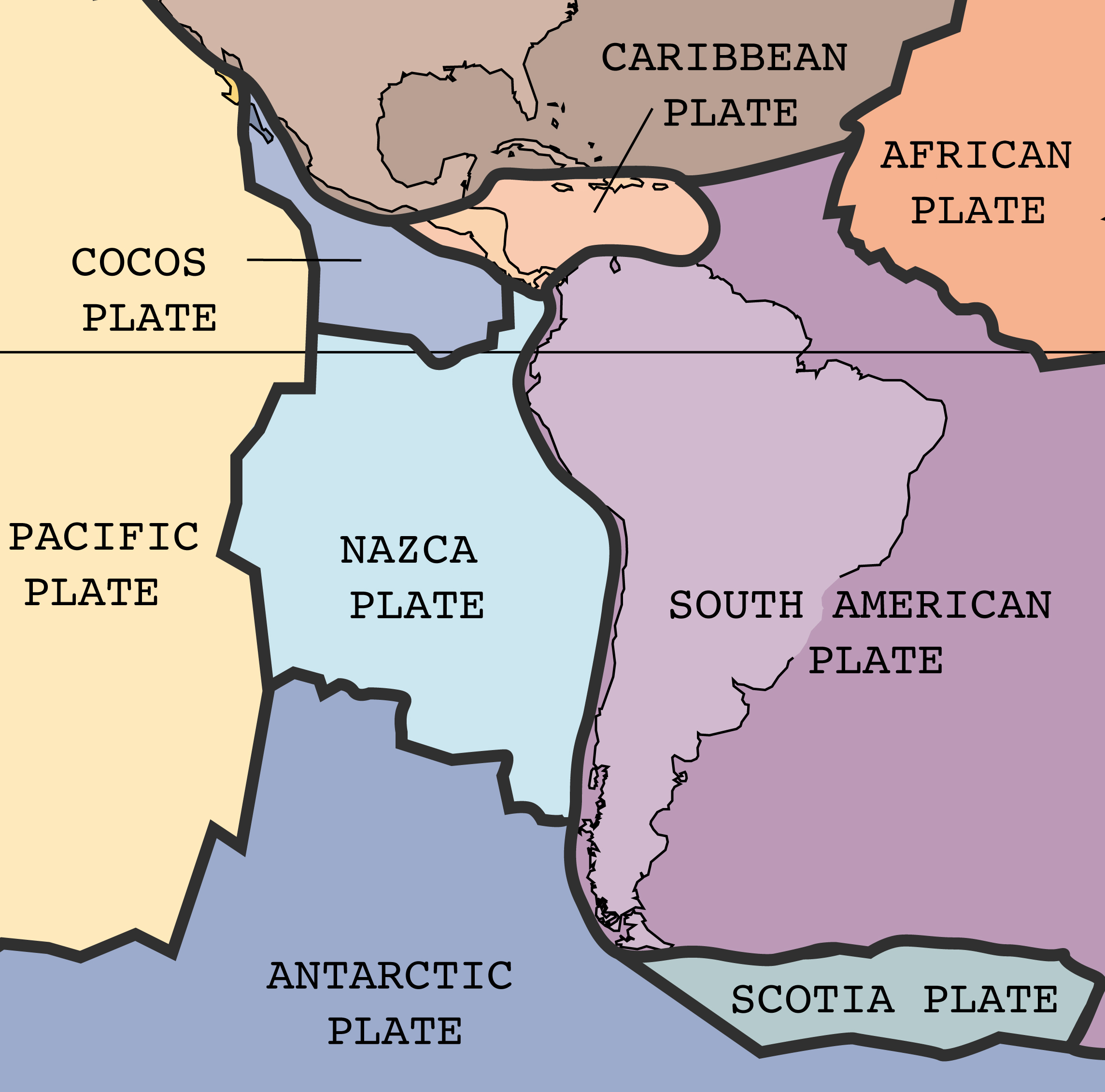
The subduction of the Nazca Plate resulted in the formation of the Andean Volcanic Belt and the Peru–Chile Trench.

Subduction of the eastern edge of the Nazca Plate under the western edge of the South American Plate occurs about 160 kilometers (99 mi) west of Peru and Chile, at a rate of 9 to 11 centimetres (4 in) per year at 30 degrees south latitude. This subduction process has resulted in the formation of the Peru–Chile Trench, an oceanic trench in the Pacific Ocean. It also produced the Andean Volcanic Belt and the rest of the Andes.

Calabozos is one of 45 Holocene epoch volcanoes located in central Chile and Argentina. It is included within the Southern Volcanic Zone, the most active section of the Chilean Andes. The date of its last known eruption is not known with precision, though it took place during the Holocene.

Through K-Ar dating, geologist Robert Edward Drake established the age of 66 events in central Chile, and divided them into groups based on the time of their origin. In a paper published in 1976, he described the location of each group and the west–east-trending movement of volcanism in the range.

To the west of the Chilean Andes are an early group of eruptions, dated from the Oligocene and the Early Miocene (33.3–20.2 mya). The scale of the eruptive events that produced these features remains unclear. Further east, in the actual range, are huge numbers of eruptions. Between 15.3 and 6.4 mya, widespread volcanism took place, followed by extensive folding; this process then repeated itself from 18.4 to 13.7 mya during the Miocene. Beginning 6.4 mya the Chilean Andes were quiet, though whether or not this quiet period took place throughout all of the Andes remains unknown. Central Chilean volcanoes became active once again around 2.5 mya, and have erupted almost continuously since.

=== Local ===
Calabozos lies in an area between thick and thin continental crust, and its eruptions are probably fed from a pool of andesitic and rhyolitic magma that sits just under its caldera. The caldera is underlain by a layer of volcaniclastic sedimentary rock from the Mesozoic era coalesced with intrusive and volcanic rocks of Tertiary age, over a layer of Precambrian to Triassic sedimentary and metamorphic rock formed from later plutons (magma intrusions). Under its northeast edge, Calabozos is cut by a north–south trending segment of sedimentary rock that includes gypsiferous and carbonates.

Calabozos is similar in age to Cerro Azul and Descabezado Grande, and its eruptions may correspond to past activity at both volcanoes. Eruption products of very similar composition (including mafic andesite, agglutinates, and dacite) make up the volcanoes. There is also a similarity in size (all are between 40 and 70 cubic kilometers in volume).

The volcano appears to be part of a north–south trending group of rhyolitic, silicic Quaternary volcanoes (including Puelche volcanic field, Laguna del Maule, and Volcán Domuyo) that veers off the north-northeast direction of the rest of the Andes. The directional formation of this belt corresponds to the fold-and-thrust movement of the nearby Malargüe fault, which formed in the Tertiary and remained active until the early Pliocene or late Miocene. This may suggest that Calabozos' activity is more dependent on local processes than subduction of the Nazca Plate.

=== Geologic record ===
In comparison to the well-preserved rocks of the dry, central part of the Andes, the record that defines the southern sector is poorly preserved. Remnants of Miocene and Quaternary eruptions within the central part are clearly preserved in the rock record. Ash flow sheets constitute as much as 40 percent of the area's total erupted material, suggesting that pyroclastic eruptions were rather important during this time. By examining the eruption rate of individual volcanoes, Hildreth et al. concluded that similar amounts of ash-flow volcanism took place in the southern sector as well. Their study established that in particular silicic ash was missing from the record, and concluded that erosion had probably disrupted deposition of volcaniclastic rock.

While the volcanic history of the area extends back far further, the earliest fully recognizable events in the region are recorded in the pyroclastic Campanario Formation. This sequence appears to begin at Laguna de la Invernada and ranges from 15 to 6 mya. Remnants of magma intrusions as young as 7 mya can be found at the lake (Laguna de la Invernada).

The most recent volcanic phase began about 4 mya, producing largely andesitic eruptions. A series of eruptions built up a broad plateau of lava, and extended over the area where Calabozos now lies. Locally, this plateau was composed of mafic andesite with olivine, which over time gathered to form 300-metre (1,000 ft) to 500-metre (1,600 ft) thick layers. Nearby volcanoes sit on top of two mya lavas that formed during this period, while the Loma Seca Tuff lies atop andesitic deposits from Descabezado Grande.

=== Composition ===
Calabozos lies between two different types of volcanism—to its north, andesite and rhyolite are the primary constituents of lava while its southern neighbors are composed of more mafic andesite and basalt. It is mainly basaltic andesite and rhyodacite that make up Calabozos, forming a calcalkilic suite rich with potassium. Its lavas are dotted with phenocrysts, which vary from 2 to 25 percent of their mass. These phenocrysts are typically made of plagioclase, but also contain clinopyroxene, orthopyroxene, ilmenite, apatite, and titanomagnetite.

== Climate and vegetation ==
The area's rainfall averages 134 centimetres (53 in) annually, varying from 50 centimetres (20 in) at its lowest to 225 centimetres (89 in) at its highest. Precipitation between May and August (primarily snow) is normally 20 to 35 centimetres (7.9 to 13.8 in), dropping to below 1 centimetre (0.39 in) during summer. Temperature is also variable, typically registering 25 °C (77 °F) during the summer, but dropping below freezing at high elevations (above 2,500 metres (8,200 ft)).

Vegetation is rare in the area. The 1932 eruption of Cerro Azul's Quizapu Crater reduced much of the land to a pumice desert. Above 1,200 metres (3,900 ft), vegetation becomes even more sparse.

== Eruptive history ==
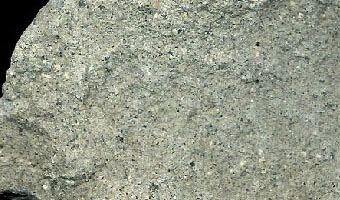
Calabozos' tuff eruptions were mostly rhyodacitic and dacitic in origin.

During the late Pleistocene, Calabozos erupted tuff composed primarily of rhyodacite and dacite. Three distinct eruptions have taken place within the last million years. The sheets of remaining ash left over from all of the eruptions together range from 200 cubic kilometres (48 cu mi) to 500 cubic kilometres (120 cu mi) in volume and are known as the Loma Seca Tuff.

The first eruption, which took place 0.8 mya, was distinct from later eruptions in that its product lacks flattened lenticles (lens-shaped layers of mineral or rock embedded in rock). The tuff is dotted with predominantly plagioclase phenocrysts, which make up between less than 5 to approximately 15 percent of each particle's mass. After being erupted, the material settled in canyons, where it underwent glaciation. This carved cliffs which drop as much as 100 metres (328 ft). The tuff is limited to just a few kilometers around the complex.

Taking place 0.3 mya, the second eruption was the most extensive. It was probably between 250 cubic kilometres (60 cu mi) and 300 cubic kilometres (72 cu mi) in volume and extended past the reaches of the caldera, down the adjacent foothills. Beyond the caldera, the eruptive products are poor in phenocrysts (unlike those of the first eruption). They are instead rich in lithic material, which makes up as much as 10 percent of the rock in parts (50 percent at the base of the caldera). As the first of the ash was deposited, it accumulated in layers that formed quickly and resisted erosion, but only partially melded together. However, except for these basal layers and thin zones where the ash was devitrified (loses the properties of a glass and becomes brittle), the entire sheet is melded together. Inside Calabozos, the ash resisted welding and contains more phenocrysts. Instead, erosion ate away at it, in the form of acid leaching, and broke down much of its pumice content. Still, the rock layer here contains five to 30 percent phenocrysts, and has high levels of devitrification and lithic content.

The differences between these two deposits can be accounted for by a few factors, including time of eruption and placement. The material inside the caldera must be younger and erupted from a pool of magma that had larger crystals. Its extensive erosion can be explained by the presence of hydrothermal vents, and its high levels of lithics probably originate from either being exposed to the rocks after they were erupted, lying adjacent to them while they underwent subsidence, or is a result of long, slow formation. Any of these reasons would also effectively account for the poor mixing of the lavas.

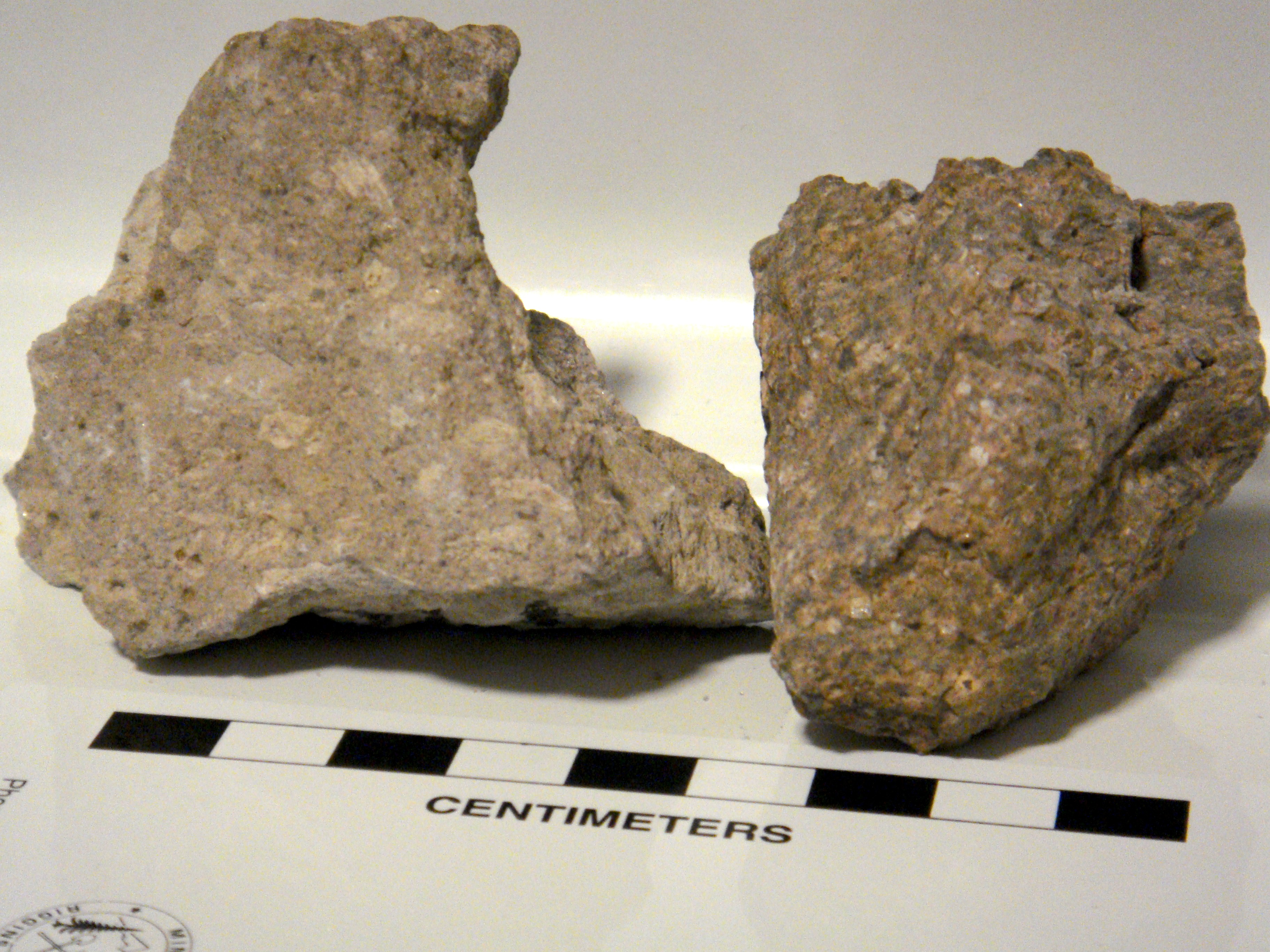
The third eruption was high in fiamme (on the right), and erupted material with large phenocrysts.

Activity continued for approximately 150,000 years in the form of quiet andesitic eruptions, as glaciation took place. About 0.15 mya (150,000 years ago), a third and final ash flow was erupted. With a volume of 175 cubic kilometers (42 cu mi) to 250 cubic kilometres (60 cu mi), it was smaller than the second eruption, but acted similarly, and had much more densely welded tuff. The ash was thickest at 300 metres (984 ft), at Loma Seca, and the top of the deposit has undergone erosion. It is densely welded in crevasses, but not at thin 50 metres (164 ft) layers, where much of the material is barely welded or not welded at all.

The first layers of the last deposit were alternating belts of light and dark-colored material, and were densely welded. They appear to have been erupted in pulses, and continue for hundreds of meters. Deposition was continuous except for one interruption, which can be seen at proximity to the caldera, where the layers are replaced by thin, nonwelded sheets of lava. Another zone of nonwelded material, about 20 metres (66 ft) and near Cajon Los Calabozos, underwent no erosion, suggesting that activity stopped, then began again.

High in fiamme, the third tuff layer differs from the second in that it has even higher phenocryst content, but poor lithics. In the fiamme, phenocrysts constitute between 5 and 15 percent of the rock, increasing to 25 to 30 percent near the caldera. In the younger emplacements, clinopyroxene is evident along with an increase in mafic content.

== Threats and preparedness ==
Calabozos is in the South Volcanic Zone, which contains potentially deadly and active volcanoes such as Mount Hudson, Llaima, and Villarrica. Villarrica and Llaima together have more than 80 reported episodes of volcanism since 1558, and at least 40 South Volcanic Zone volcanoes have had Holocene-age eruptions. After the 2010 Maule earthquake, vertical movement took place along the caldera margins.

Its remoteness means that Calabozos poses little threat to humans, but if necessary relief efforts could be orchestrated. The Volcanic Disaster Assistance Program (VDAP) formed in response to the famous eruption of Nevado del Ruiz in Colombia and saved lives following the 1991 eruption of Mount Hudson in Chile by organizing evacuations. The team's stated aim is to "reduce eruption-caused fatalities and economic losses in developing countries". Made up of various USGS offices such as the Cascades Volcano Observatory (CVO), responsible for monitoring Mount St. Helens, the team has equipment to monitor any volcano, allowing the timely prediction of volcanic eruptions and the evacuation of nearby homes.

== See also ==
- Geology of Chile
- List of volcanoes in Chile
