= Melado River =

River in Chile

Coordinates: 35.82394°S 70.97237°W

Melado River

The Melado is a river of Linares province, Maule Region, of Chile. It rises in the "Cordillera de los Andes" with the name of river Guaiquivilo where it is formed by two tributaries, the river Cajón Troncoso, originating near the Argentine border and the river Palaleo, from the outflow of Dial lake, located some 70 km upstream from the joining of the two rivers. The Guaiquivilo flows northwardly along a typical interandean longitudinal valley.

On its left bank the Guaiquivilo is flanked by the Melado sierra, which has peaks that often surpass 2.500 mt and which constitute a natural barrier between the Guaiquivilo basin and those of the rivers Longaví, Achibueno and Ancoa, all tributary of the river Loncomilla, which, in its turn, is the main tributary of river Maule.

On its right bank, the Guaiquivilo is joined by the river San Pedro or La Puente which is born from a glacier related to the San Pedro (or Las Yeguas) volcano. From this point onwards, the river takes the name of Melado.

The river Melado is dammed to generate hydroelectric power in the Pehuenche Hydroelectric Plant.

The Melado joins the river Maule when the latter has already flowed for 75 km.

The Canal Melado transports water from the Melado river through the Guaiquivilo basin and a tunnel of 4,2 km to the Ancoa River.
