= Pehuenche (disambiguation) =

The Pehuenche are an indigenous people of Chile and Argentina.

Pehuenche may also refer to:

- Pehuenche language
- Pehuenche Hydroelectric Plant, in Maule Region, Chile

== See also ==
- Pehuenches Department, in Neuquén Province, Argentina
