= Campanario =

Campanario or Campanário may refer to:

== Places ==
- El Campanario y Oradel, Tamaulipas, a city in the municipality of Nuevo Laredo, Mexico
- Campanário, Madeira, a parish in the municipality of Ribeira Brava, Madeira, Portugal
- Campanário, Minas Gerais, a municipality in Minas Gerais, Brazil
- Campanario, Badajoz, a town in Extremadura, Spain

== Geology ==
- Campanario Formation (Neogene), geological formation of Neogene age in Central Chile and western Argentina
- Campanario Formation (Cambrian), a geological formation of Cambrian age in the Argentine Northwest

== Other ==
- Belfry (architecture), a bell tower (in Italian or Spanish)
