= Descabezado Grande =

Mountain in Chile

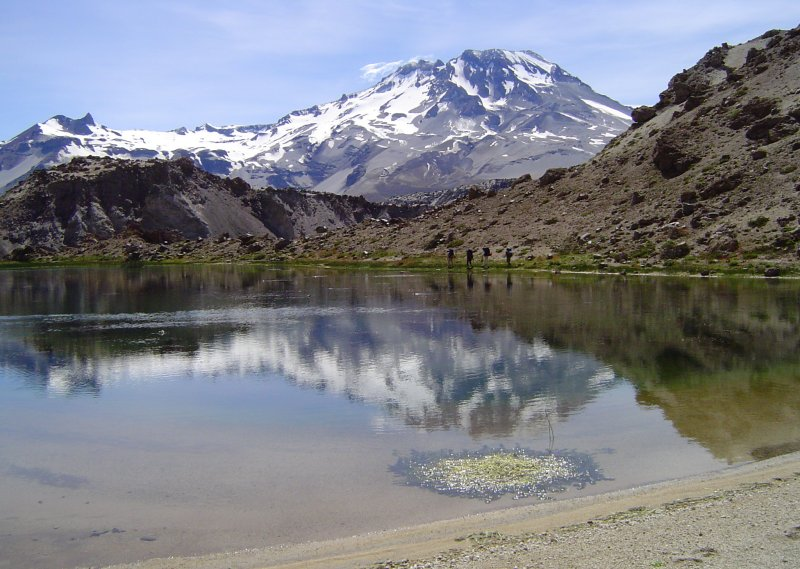

Highest point
- Elevation: 3,953 m (12,969 ft)
- Coordinates: 35°35′26″S 70°44′48″W

Geography
- Location within Chile
- Location: Central Chile
- Parent range: Andes

Geology
- Rock age: Pleistocene
- Mountain type: Stratovolcano
- Volcanic zone: South Volcanic Zone
- Last eruption: June 1933

Descabezado Grande (also Cerro Azul or Quizapu) is a stratovolcano located in the Maule Region of central Chile. It is capped by a 1.4-kilometre-wide (0.9 mi) ice-filled caldera and named for its flat-topped form, as descabezado means "headless" in Spanish. A smaller crater about 500 metres (1,600 ft) wide is found in the northeast part of the caldera, and it has active fumaroles.

The volcano is composed of andesite and rhyodacite lava flows along with pyroclastic flow deposits. It has a basal diameter of about 10 by 12 kilometres (6.2 by 7.5 mi) and a total volume of about 30 cubic kilometres (7.2 cu mi). Along with Cerro Azul, 7 kilometres (4.3 mi) to the south, it lies at the center of a 20-by-30-kilometre (12-by-19-mile) volcanic field.

== Gallery ==
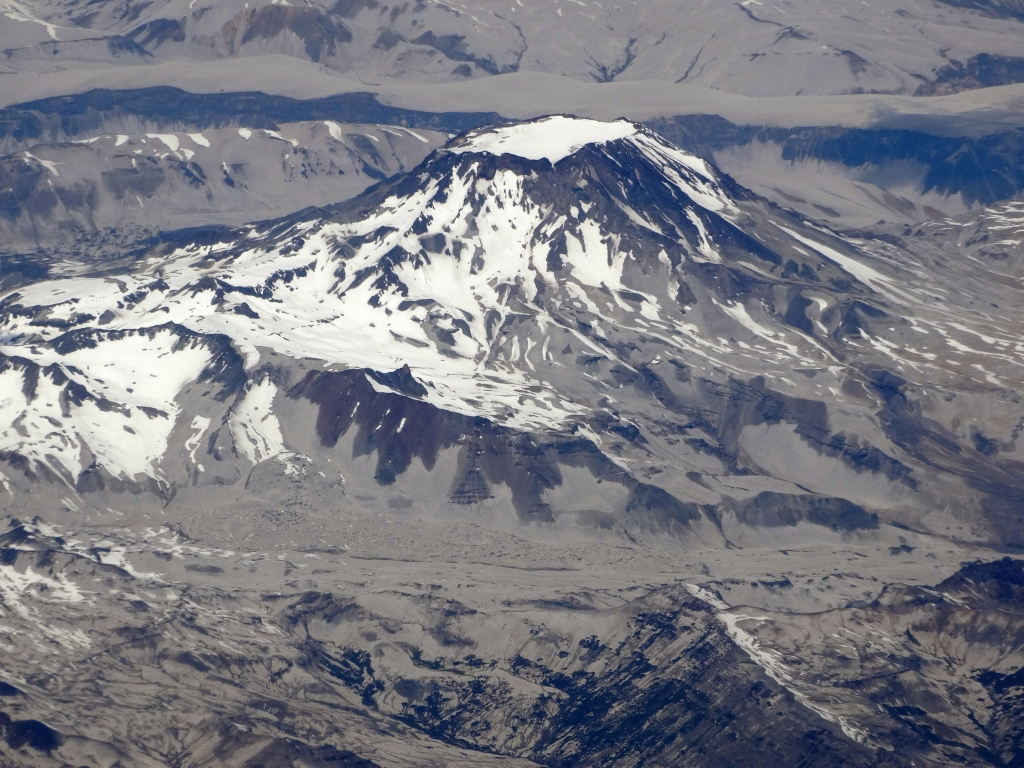
Descabezado Grande volcano from the air. View to the east.

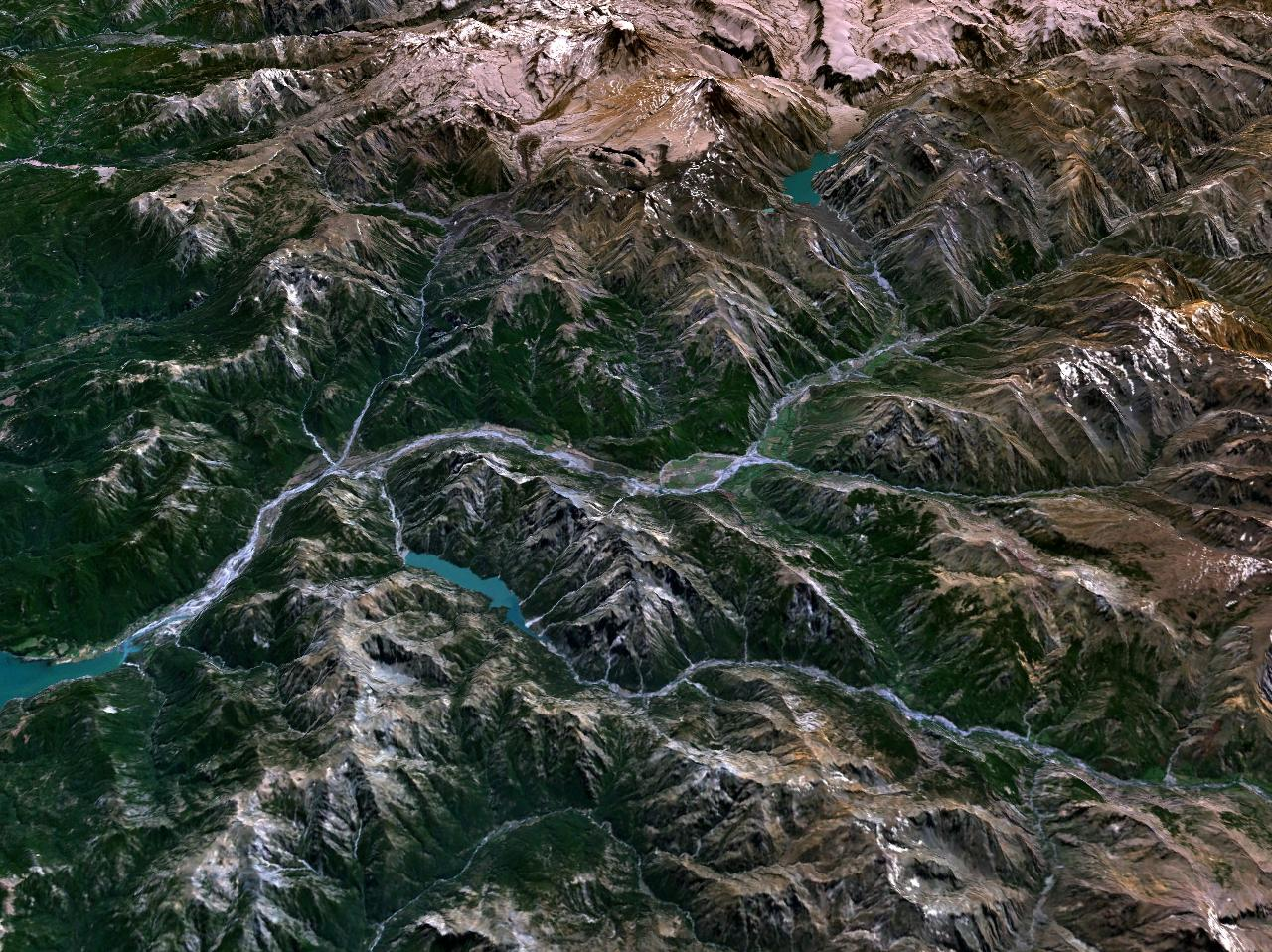
Descabezado Grande is in the top center of this NASA World Wind screenshot.

== See also ==
- List of volcanoes in Chile
