= Ancoa River =

River in Chile

Coordinates: 35.91853°S 71.39757°W

Ancoa River

Ancoa is a river, tributary of the Achibueno, in Linares Province, Maule Region of Chile.
