= Achibueno River =

River in Chile

Coordinates: 35°52′42.90″S 71°38′05.00″W

Maule cuenca

Achibueno is a river, tributary of the Loncomilla, in Linares Province, Maule Region of Chile, where it forms the border between the municipalities of Linares and Longaví.

It is born from the homonym glacial lake, situated to the east of the Nevado de Longaví, a stratovolcano in the Andes of central Chile. Through its upper section it flows west of the Melado range, surrounded by high Andean mountains. In this first stage it receives several streams specially on its northern side. From the lake the water falls, creating an impressive cascade, to the area known as "Bajo de las Lástimas"; (a translation would be Lowlands of Sorrow - the explanation is that in the area lies a trail for cattle which, at this section, is extremely difficult for the animals to negotiate).

Down to the small village of Pejerrey the valley still sustains woods which are a transition to the ones located further south in Chile, with species such as the Chilean Oak (Nothofagus glauca), Arrayán (Luma apiculata), Coigüe (Nothofagus dombeyi), and others. Roads reach only up to the “Las Ánimas” stream, making this valley a unique experience for trekking, following crystalline waters between woods and mountains. Further west the Achibueno receives as affluent the river Ancoa, near the Pan-American Highway (CH-5 Sur), and flows a few kilometres south of the city of Linares. In this area there is a magnificent railway bridge. The Achibueno is the most important tributary to the river Loncomilla.

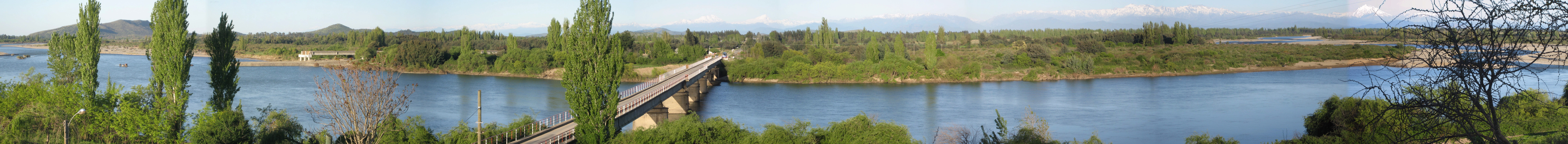
Right: The Achibueno River (up right) flows ito the Loncomilla River (right). In the middle the old Puente Sifón, since 2010 in restricted use, and left the new Bridge, then under construction, since 2010 in use.
