= Pehuenche Hydroelectric Plant =

Coordinates: 35.7591°S 71.0884°W

Pehuenche Hydroelectric Plant is a hydroelectric power station in Maule Region, Chile. The plant uses water from Melado River and produces 500 megawatts (670,000 hp) of electricity. The plant was built by ENDESA in 1991 (34 years ago) and is owned by Pehuenche S.A.
