= Puelche volcanic field =

Volcanic field in Chile

- Location within Chile

Highest point
- Elevation: 3,140 m (10,300 ft)
- Coordinates: 35.78°S 70.48°W

The Puelche volcanic field is a volcanic field in the Andes of east-central Chile near the border with Argentina. It is the most extensively known group of Quaternary rhyolitic lava flows in the Southern Volcanic Zone of the Andean Volcanic Belt which has formed as a result of subduction zone volcanism. The Puelche volcanic field is Pleistocene in age and no Holocene eruptions are known.

== See also ==
- List of volcanic fields
