= Mocha fracture zone =

Fracture zone on the Nazca Plate off the coast of Mocha Island

The Mocha fracture zone (MFZ) is a fracture zone on the Nazca plate off the coast of Mocha Island, Chile. The Mocha fracture zone trends from the Valdivia fracture zone in the south to the Peru–Chile Trench axis 100 km west of Mocha Island.

== See also ==
- Transform fault
