= Campanario Formation =

Geological formation in Chile and Argentina

- Stratigraphic range: Late Miocene–Early Pliocene
- Type: Geological formation

Lithology
- Primary: Tuff, breccia, welded tuff, andesite lava, dacite lava

Location
- Coordinates: 36.0°S 71.6°W
- Region: Maule & Bío Bío Regions; Neuquén Province
- Country: Chile, Argentina

Type section
- Named by: Robert E. Drake
- Year defined: 1974
- Campanario Formation (Chile)

Campanario Formation (Spanish: Formación Campanario) is a Miocene geological formation in the high Andes of Central Chile and northern Neuquén Province in Argentina. The formation crops out around the upper parts of the basins of Maule and Ñuble rivers.
