= San Pedro de Tatara =

Volcano in Chile

Coordinates: 36.00°S 71.83°W

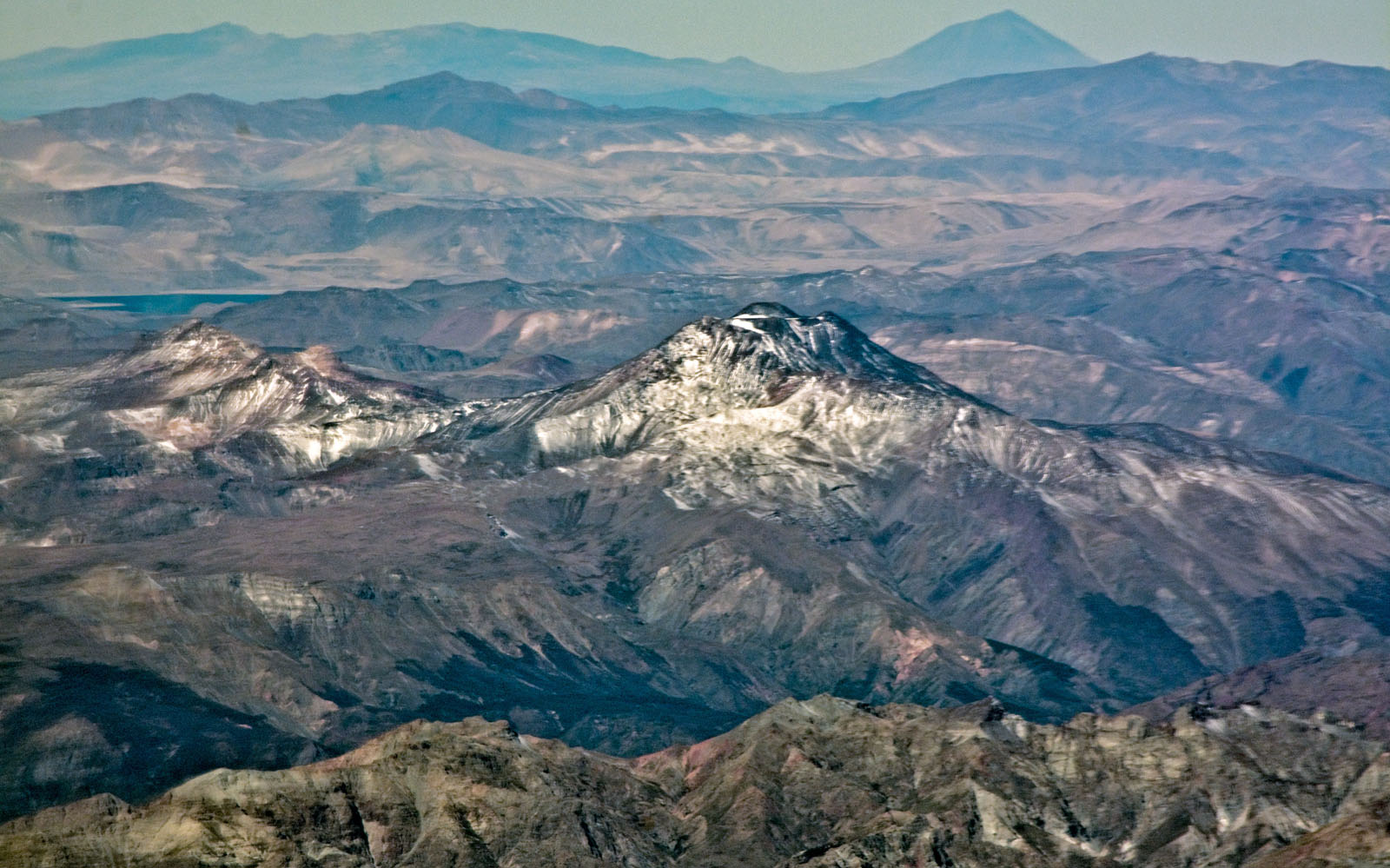
Aerial photograph of the San Pedro Pellado composite volcano

San Pedro de Tatara, also known as San Pedro-Pellado, is a volcano in Chile.

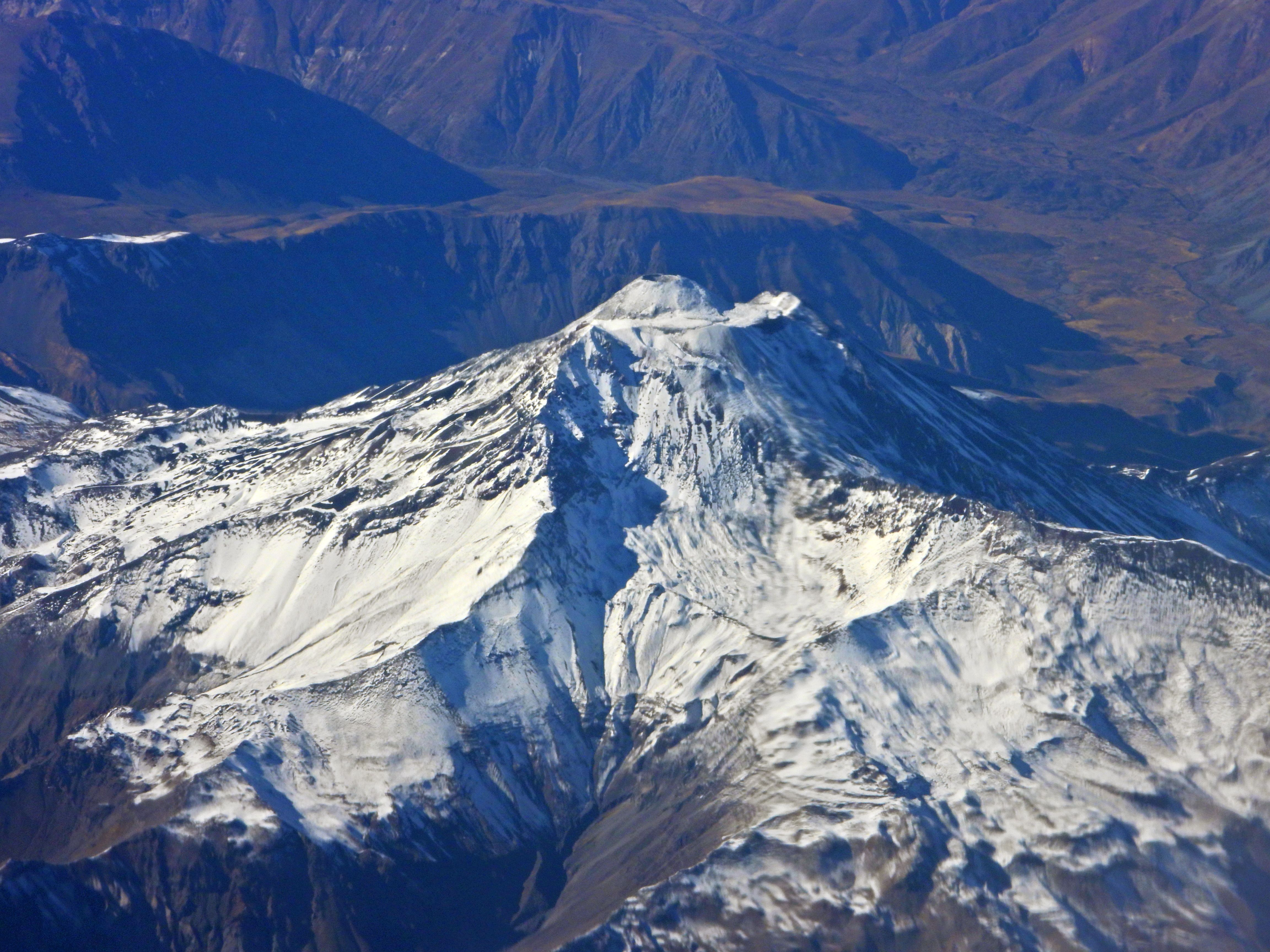
Volcan San Pedro with its characteristic piroclastic cone at the top. Seen from air towards the east.

== See also ==
- List of volcanoes in Chile
