= Cerro Azul (Chile volcano) =

Mountain in Curicó Province, Chile

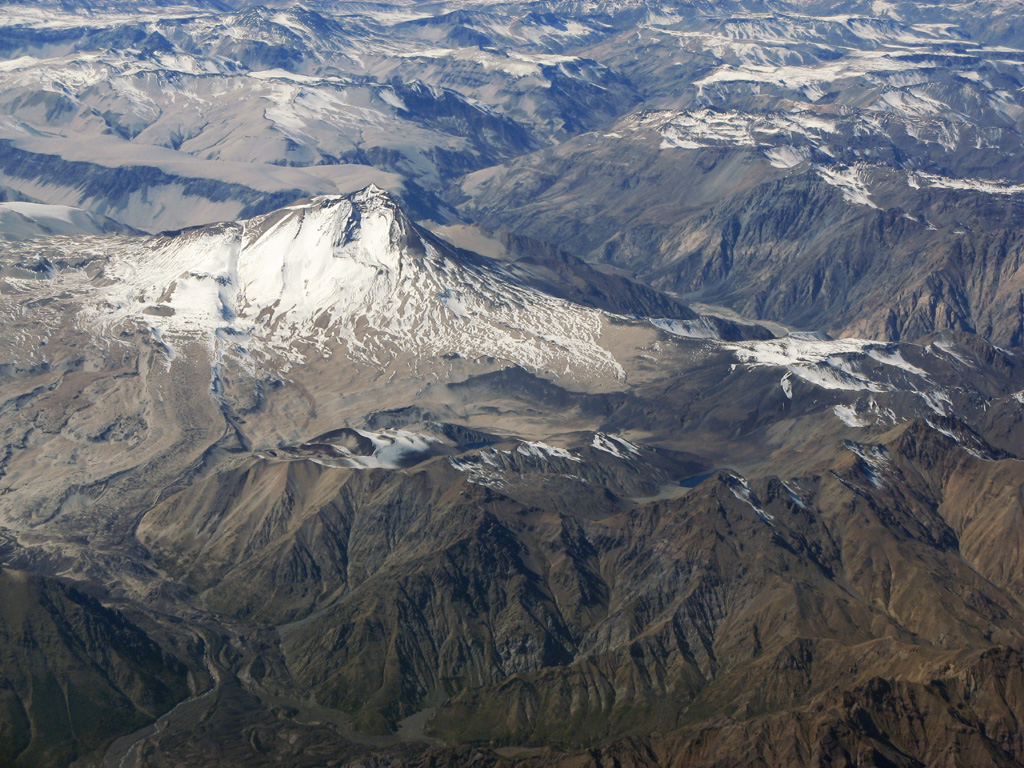
- Aerial view of Cerro Azul from the west.

Highest point
- Elevation: 3,788 m (12,428 ft)
- Listing: List of volcanoes in Chile
- Coordinates: 35°39′11″S 70°45′40″W

Geography
- Location within Chile
- Location: Chile
- Parent range: Andes

Geology
- Rock age: Quaternary
- Mountain type: Stratovolcano
- Volcanic zone: South Volcanic Zone
- Last eruption: August 1967

Cerro Azul (Spanish pronunciation: [ˈsero aˈsul], blue hill in Spanish), sometimes referred to as Quizapu, is an active stratovolcano in the Maule Region of central Chile, immediately south of Descabezado Grande. Part of the South Volcanic Zone of the Andes, its summit is 3,788 meters (12,428 ft) above sea level, and is capped by a summit crater that is 500 meters (1,600 ft) wide and opens to the north. Beneath the summit, the volcano features numerous scoria cones and flank vents.

Cerro Azul is responsible for several of South America's largest recorded eruptions, in 1846 and 1932. In 1846, an effusive eruption formed the vent at the site of present-day Quizapu crater on the northern flank of Cerro Azul and sent lava flowing down the sides of the volcano, creating a lava field 8–9 square kilometres (3–3.5 square miles) in area. Phreatic and Strombolian volcanism between 1907 and 1932 excavated this crater. In 1932, one of the largest explosive eruptions of the 20th century occurred at Quizapu Crater and sent 9.5 cubic kilometers (2.3 cu mi) of ash into the atmosphere. The volcano's most recent eruption was in 1967.

The South Volcanic Zone has a long history of eruptions and poses a threat to the surrounding region. Any volcanic hazard—ranging from minor ashfalls to pyroclastic flows—could pose a significant risk to humans and wildlife. Despite its inactivity, Cerro Azul could again produce a major eruption; if this were to happen, relief efforts would probably be quickly organized. Teams such as the Volcano Disaster Assistance Program (VDAP) are prepared to effectively evacuate, assist, and rescue people threatened by volcanic eruptions.

== Geography and geology ==
=== Regional setting ===
Volcanism in the Chilean Andes is caused by subduction of the Nazca and Antarctic tectonic plates under the South American Plate. Volcanoes in Chile occur in the Central (CVZ), South (SVZ), and Austral Volcanic Zones (AVZ). The gap that separates the Central and South Volcanic Zones is caused by shallow-angle subduction in the Pampean flat-slab segment where the more buoyant Juan Fernández Ridge subducts under the South American continent. This buoyant region prevents the slab (subducting tectonic plate) from diving deep into the mantle, where the heat and pressure would destabilize the mineral chlorite, releasing water that would in turn cause melting and volcanism. The Patagonian Volcanic Gap, which separates the South and Austral Volcanic Zones, is caused by the subduction of the Chile Ridge, though it is less clear whether this gap also is due to flat-slab subduction; it may instead arise because melting of the subducting slab there produced felsic igneous rocks instead of volcanoes.

Offshore volcanism also occurs in Chile. Intraplate volcanism generated from the Easter and Juan Fernández hotspots has formed many Chilean islands, including Isla Salas y Gómez, Easter Island, and the Juan Fernández Islands. Underwater volcanism occurs due to seafloor spreading along the Chile Ridge.

Nearly 100 Quaternary (Pleistocene- or Holocene-age) independent volcanoes exist in the country, in addition to 60 volcanic complexes and caldera systems. Of the 200 historically active volcanoes in the Andean Range, 36 are found in Chile.

=== Local setting ===
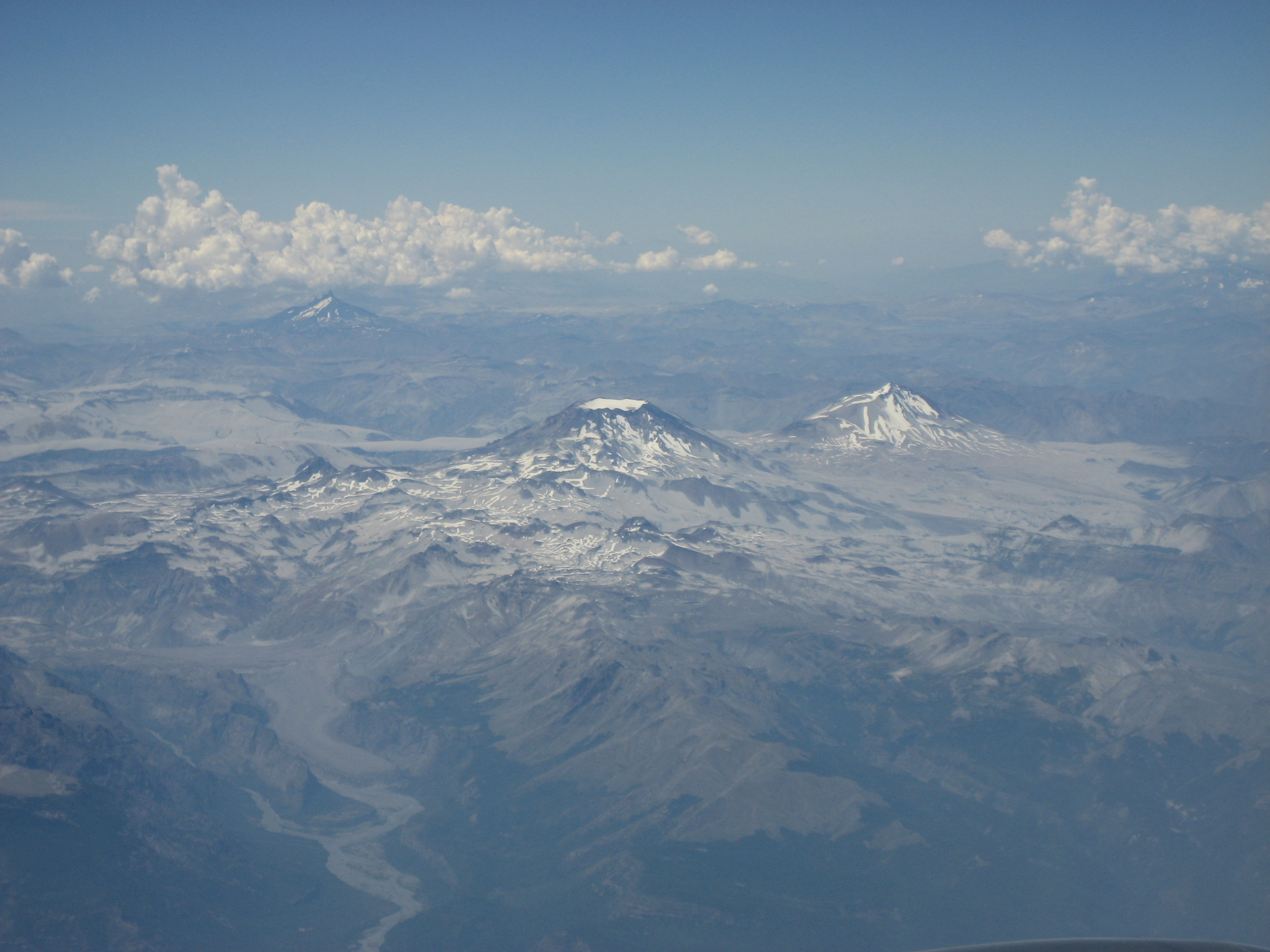
The mountain with the appearance of a truncated cone, at the centre of the image, is Descabezado Grande volcano, and close to it is the pyramidal Cerro Azul.

Cerro Azul is part of the South Volcanic Zone, which runs through central and western Chile and extends south to Argentina. This range includes at least nine caldera complexes, more than 70 of Chile's stratovolcanoes and volcanic fields that have been active in the Quaternary, and hundreds of minor eruptive centres. The South Volcanic Zone is the most volcanically active region in Chile, and produces around one eruption per year. Its largest historical eruption was at Quizapu Crater, located on the north side of Cerro Azul's summit (see below), and its most active volcanoes are Llaima and Villarrica.

Cerro Azul, just 7 kilometers (4.3 mi) south of Descabezado Grande volcano, is part of the Descabezado Grande–Cerro Azul eruptive system, a volcanic field that comprises its two large namesake volcanic edifices and several smaller vents, including 12 Holocene calderas. Both volcanoes lie on top of the Casitas Shield, a plateau built of over 100 lava flows that erupted in at least 12 volcanic episodes during the Quaternary period. The upper lava layers are dated at 340,000 years.

As with the majority of the Andean volcanoes, Cerro Azul is a stratovolcano, meaning that it consists of layers, or strata, of volcanic ash and lava flows. The cone of Cerro Azul has a total volume of about 11 cubic kilometers (3 cu mi), and is a young feature, formed in the Holocene. It is made of agglutinated pyroclasts and some dacite–andesine lavas. The cone has a few volcanic craters; the majority of its eruptions in recorded history have originated from Quizapu Crater on the northern flank of Cerro Azul's cone. Other craters lying on the flanks of the main cone are Caracol ("Snail"), Crater los Quillayes, Crater la Resolana, and Crater sin Nombre ("Nameless Crater"). All of the craters lie between 2,000 and 3,000 meters (6,600 and 9,800 ft) in elevation, except Quizapu, which is 3,292 meters (10,801 ft) up the volcano. The summit of Cerro Azul is crowned by an asymmetric crater about 500 meters (1,640 ft) in diameter. Pleistocene glacial activity is evident in the form of 500 meter (1,640 ft) deep struts in the volcanoes' sides. These deep cuts have revealed strata of older rock.

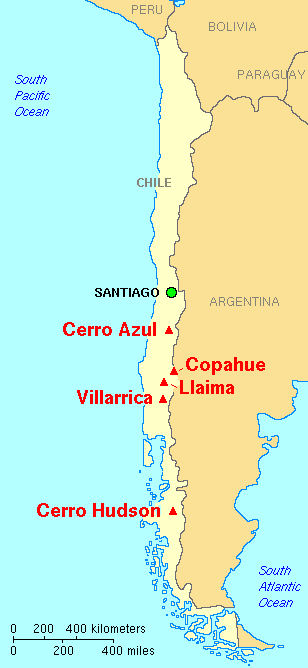
Major Chilean volcanoes are marked by red triangles on this map.

=== Quizapu Crater ===
Quizapu, which formed during the 1846 eruption, is the most prominent crater. It is also known as Cerro del Medio ("Middle Hill") or Volcan Nuevo ("New Volcano"). The volcanic vent formed during an effusive eruption involving hornblende–dacite flows accompanied by tephra, and the crater was excavated by phreatic and Strombolian eruptions between 1907 and 1932. Pent-up pressure within the volcano spawned an enormous Plinian eruption in 1932. The volume of lava ejected during this single event is roughly equal to that ejected during the rest of the eruptive history at Quizapu, since its formation in 1846. Although 9.5 cubic kilometers (2.3 cu mi) of material was ejected, no subsidence was detected from the removal of magma. Because of aerodynamic drag, a Plinian eruption excavates a circular crater. As the earlier eruptions had already formed an approximately circular caldera, the Plinian eruption was able to proceed efficiently, with minimal drag and minimal reshaping of the crater.

The Quizapu Crater is almost perfectly circular, and rises to a prominence of 150 to 250 meters (490 to 820 ft) above the surrounding portions of the volcano. Cresting at 3,292 meters (10,801 ft) in elevation, Quizapu is one of the highest known Plinian craters. The radius of the crater floor, which is the current inner vent, is around 150 meters (500 ft), while the radius of its rim is 300–350 meters (980–1,150 ft). The crater floor lies at 2,928 meters (9,606 ft), and the rim lies 150–300 meters (500–1,000 ft) above that, giving the walls an average slope of 34–35 degrees (close to the angle of repose). The western wall is cut by two long, dacitic lava flows: probably the remnants of a dome or an eruption. The crater is surrounded by debris from its 1932 eruption, and topped by layers—50 meters (160 ft) thick—of mafic scoria and ash.

== Climate and vegetation ==
Cerro Azul is situated in a Mediterranean climate zone, characterized by hot and dry summers but mild and wet winters. The temperatures and precipitation are strongly dependent on topography. In the Andes the annual average maximum temperatures lie in the range 20 to 25 °C (68 to 77 °F), while minimum temperatures are below 0 °C (32 °F). Annual precipitation is up to 800 mm (31.5 inches).

Vegetation in the Andes varies with elevation. Above 1,600 meters (5,249 ft) the slopes of mountains are covered by Alpine-like steppe, while below there are zones of Nothofagus forest, Hygrophilous forest, Sclerophylous forest, and matorral. The number of plant species is likely to exceed 2,000, although no comprehensive study of the flora of Central Chile has been undertaken.

== Eruptive history ==
Cerro Azul has a history of eruptions dating back to at least 1846. The known events include effusive eruptions (lava flows), which created the Quizapu vent, explosive eruptions, and phreatic eruptions. Pyroclastic flows have also been observed as a result of some of these explosive eruptions. The earliest recorded eruption began on November 26, 1846, while the volcano's last eruption began on August 9, 1967. The volcano has produced two of the largest eruptions in South America in recorded history, in 1846 and 1932. Both released 4–5 cubic kilometers (1.0–1.2 mi^{3}) of the dacitic magma.

=== First record of activity, 1846 ===
On November 26, 1846, Cerro Azul erupted. This was the first report of activity at the volcano, and no trace of fumaroles, adjacent vents, or pre-eruptive activity exists. Most descriptions of the eruption come from the backcountry herdsmen (arrieros). One, who was camped in a valley approximately 7 kilometers (4 mi) east of Quizapu, heard "a great noise and a cloud of ash" emanate from the mountain in the late afternoon. No precursor activity was reported, and the herdsman claimed that there were no earthquakes during the late afternoon eruption.

That night, two herdsmen near the site heard a continuous roar, punctuated by loud bangs and crackling sounds "like that of great rockslides". Lightning and thunder accompanied the spectacle. They saw many blue flames, and were choked by sulfurous gas. Observers in Talca 85 kilometers (53 mi) away heard the eruption noises, and the sulfurous odors reached them the day after the eruption. None of the reports mention earthquakes or ash fall, though the crackling and banging sounds could be from block lavas (ʻaʻā).

This first recorded eruption of Cerro Azul was effusive, and formed the volcanic vent at Quizapu. Hornblende–dacite lava erupted with small masses of tephra, which had been degassed shortly before the eruption. Lava flowed over the Estero Barroso Valley and westward into the Río Blanquillo Valley. By November 28, the volcano appeared at rest, and the herdsman returned to the place of first observation. There, they found a blocky lava field. The lava was still hot, fuming and crackling with gas and flame. Fascinated by the volcano, Ignacy Domeyko traveled to Chile to study the field and found its width to be 8–9 square kilometers (3.1–3.5 sq mi). By 1992 the field had grown to twice that size.

=== Early 20th century ===
Cerro Azul was quiet from 1846 to the beginning of the 20th century. After a possible precursor explosive event in 1903, Cerro Azul once again erupted in 1907. Between 1907 and 1914, plumes and clouds of ash frequently rose out of the caldera, and at least a few of these events were explosive. On September 8, 1914, an explosive eruption sent a plume 6 or 7 kilometers (about 4 mi) into the air over 8 minutes. By 1916, these eruptions had produced a caldera nearly identical to the one in existence today.

The volcano also erupted phreatically several times, as recorded by Vogel in 1913 and 1920, with its activity increasing from 1916 to 1926. During these years, the eruptions grew more frequent and more violent. A major outburst on November 2, 1927 started a period of nearly continuous violent eruptions that lasted until 1929. During this period, Cerro Azul sometimes erupted daily, sending columns of ash as far as 6 or 7 kilometers (about 4 mi) into the air. Quizapu Crater grew slightly during this eruptive period.

Pre-1932 volcanism was largely phreatic or fumarolic, as evidenced by the lack of tephra generated by these eruptions. Photographs from 1912 show vapor plumes containing little ash, rising 1–2 kilometers (0.6–1.2 mi) above the crater.

=== Major eruption, 1932 ===
1932 eruption of Cerro Azul
- Start date: April 10, 1932
- End date: April 21, 1932
- Type: Plinian
- VEI: 5

By 1932, Quizapu had produced many phreatic events and one effusive eruption, but no large Plinian eruptions. This frequency of minor eruptive activity proved to be a precursor for a major eruption. On 25 January 1932, observers in Malargue saw a large black cloud over the summit. By 9 April, the volcano emitted green gas and started to "bellow like a bull". On April 10, Cerro Azul finally erupted, releasing a towering column or plume of white gas. After 10 AM, the plume turned black with ash and began to form an umbrella shape. The ash was carried by wind into Puesto El Tristan in Argentina, about 47 kilometers (29 mi) away, where beginning at 1 PM it rained down for hours. At 4 PM, coarser sandy material and some pumice lapilli began to fall.

Cerro Azul's April 1932 eruption was one of the largest of the 20th century. Releasing 9.5 cubic kilometers (2 cu mi) of lava, the volcano ejected primarily dacitic tephra, accompanied by rhyodacite, andesite, and minuscule amounts of andesitic and basaltic scoria. At least one eruptive period lasted for 18 hours, creating an "exceptionally uniform" deposit. Eruption columns, extending 27–30 kilometers (17–19 mi) into the air, were sighted. Phenocrysts were similar to the effusive eruption in 1846. Soon after, both the Tinguiririca and Descabezado Grande volcanoes began erupting, sending clouds of ash 800 kilometers (500 mi) into Argentina. The eruption had a Volcanic Explosivity Index (VEI) of at least 5.

Since the eruption of 1932 Quizapu has been quiet. In 1949 and 1967 small ash clouds were reported, while in the 1980s there were no signs of activity other than fumaroles.

== Threats and preparedness ==
Cerro Azul is in the South Volcanic Zone, where many volcanoes pose a threat to human life. Among the other active volcanoes of the South Volcanic Zone are Mount Hudson, Llaima, and Villarrica. Villarrica and Llaima together have more than 80 reported episodes of volcanism since 1558, and at least 40 South Volcanic Zone volcanoes have had Holocene-age eruptions.

Every known type of eruption (Hawaiian, Strombolian, Plinian, subplinian, phreatic, phreatomagmatic, and Vulcanian) has occurred at some point in the range. Cerro Azul itself has experienced phreatic, Strombolian, and Plinian activity in human history. The type of eruption tends to correspond with lava composition. Strombolian eruptions at Llaima, Antuco, Villarrica, and elsewhere have been produced by basaltic to basaltic–andesitic activity. Dacitic to rhyolitic lavas have been linked to subplinian and Plinian eruptions, such as those at Quizapu (1932) and Hudson (1991). Because of this variability, volcanic hazards from Cerro Azul and the surrounding region could come in many different forms. Historical eruptions typically have produced lahars, lava flows, and ashfalls. Lava flows and lahars could wipe out entire cities or towns. Ashfall produced by explosive eruptions could interfere with air traffic. Most threatening of all is the risk of pyroclastic flows or avalanches, which have historically traversed as far as 100 kilometers (62 mi) in the region.

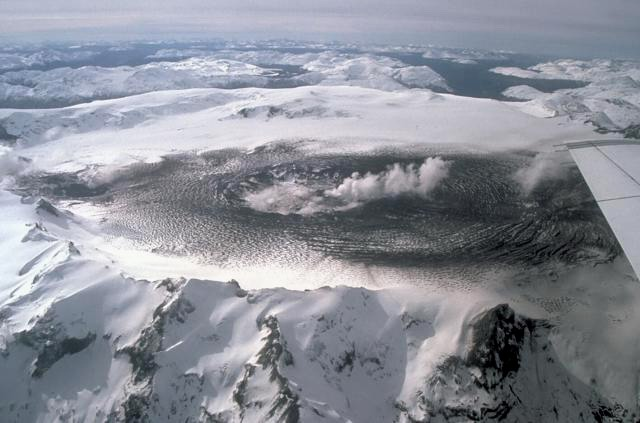
Mount Hudson, an active volcano in the SVZ, shortly after an eruption in 1991. The volcano has produced eruptions as powerful as Volcanic Explosivity Index degree six.

Past eruptions of Quizapu Crater ejected enormous amounts of ash that traveled as far as Brazil. After the 1932 eruption, the local vegetation was devastated, and the area remained barren until the 1990s, though human life was not impacted. Despite the extent of its eruptions, the threat to humans from Quizapu is relatively small because of the remote location of Cerro Azul. Nevertheless, the size of past eruptions is large enough for scientists to be worried. Evidence of a potentially deadly threat lies in a lahar at Descabezado Grande. Historically, lahars have killed thousands in the Andes. There is, however, a possibility that a large reservoir of rhyodacite magma may exist under the Azul–Descabezado complex. If this is the case, all previous eruptions in 1846–1967 were only preliminary, preclimactic leaks from the large magma chamber beneath, and a large caldera-forming eruption may be expected in the future.

If Cerro Azul were to erupt, relief efforts could be orchestrated. The Volcanic Disaster Assistance Program (VDAP) formed in response to the famous 1985 eruption of Nevado del Ruiz in Colombia, and responded to the 1991 eruption of Mount Hudson in Chile. The team's stated aim is to "reduce eruption-caused fatalities and economic losses in developing countries". Made up of various USGS offices (such as the Cascades Volcano Observatory; CVO that are responsible for monitoring Mount St. Helens), the team is outfitted with equipment capable of monitoring any volcano. This equipment allows them to predict volcanic eruptions effectively and rapidly, and to evacuate nearby homes.

== See also ==
- Geology of Chile
- List of volcanoes in Chile

== Bibliography ==
- Hildreth, Wes; Drake, Robert E. (1992). "Volcán Quizapu, Chilean Andes". Bulletin of Volcanology. 54 (2): 93–125. Bibcode:1992BVol...54...93H. doi:10.1007/BF00278002. S2CID 128972435. Isopach mapping of the volcanic deposits, between 5 and 1 centimeter (2.0 and 0.4 in), contradict 1930 estimates by about half.
- Stern, Charles R.; Moreno, Hugo; López-Escobar, Leopoldo; Clavero, Jorge E.; Lara, Luis E.; Naranjo, José A.; Parada, Miguel A.; Skewes, M. Alexandra (2007). "5. Chilean Volcanoes". In Moreno, Teresa; Gibbons, Wes (eds.). Geology of Chile. London, United Kingdom: Geological Society of London. pp. 149–180. ISBN 978-1-86239-219-9.
