= Chin Chin (disambiguation) =

Chin chin is a fried snack in West Africa.

Chin Chin or variants may also refer to:

== Arts and entertainment ==
- Chin Chin (album), by Skunkhour, 1997
- "Chin chin el teporocho" 1976 film directed by Gabriel Retes.
- Chin-Chin, a 1914–15 Broadway musical starring David C. Montgomery and Fred Stone
- Qinqin, a plucked Chinese lute
- Tchin-Tchin, also known as Chin-Chin, a 1959 French romantic comedy play
- Chinchin, a fictional character in the film Sixteen Fathoms Deep
- Chin Chinchin, a Toriko character
- Chinchin, metallic rattles used by Parachico dancers
- "Chinny chin chin", a phrase from The Three Little Pigs fable
- "Mera Naam Chin Chin Chu", a Bollywood song by Geeta Dutt

== Places ==
- Chinchin, a village in Armenia
- Chinchin, a hamlet of Astis, France
- Chinchin, an administrative division of Jasin District, Malaysia
- Chinchin, a river in Chile

== Other uses ==
- "Chin chin" or variants in different languages, a drinking toast
- Chin Chin Gutierrez (born 1969), Filipino actress and environmentalist
- "Chinchin", a Japanese word for penis (similar to "Willy" in English)
- Chin chin, a popular Nigerian fried snack made from chopped pastry strands.
