= List of rivers of Chile (A–C) =

The information regarding the (Chilean) river names from A-C on this page has been compiled from the data supplied by GeoNames. It includes all features named "Rio", "Canal", "Arroyo", "Estero" and those Feature Code is associated with a stream of water. (Note: The arbitrarily selected codes are RPDS, CHN, CNLA, CNLB, CNLD, CNLI, CNLN, CNLSB, CRKT, DTCH, DTCHI, DTCHD, ESTY, FORD, SBED, STM, STMA, STMB, STMC, STMD, STMH, STMI, STMIX, STMM, STMQ, STMS, STMSB, STMX, TNLC, WTRC, WTRH)

== Content ==
This list contains:

- Name of the stream, in Spanish language
- Latitude and a link to a GeoNames map of the river
- Height of the mouth
- Other names for the same feature, if any

== List ==
Ordered list of rivers of Chile A-C
| Name | Lat & map | Mouth height (m) | Other names |
|---|---|---|---|
| Ablemos | -36.46697 | 102 | |
| Abránquil | -35.77629 | 122 | |
| Abtao | -42.32358 | 4 | |
| Abutarda | -47.62072 | 145 | |
| Achibueno | -35.783 | 97 | (Achibueno, Rio Archibueno, Achibueno, Río Archibueno) |
| Aconcagua | -32.91535 | 7 | (Aconcagua, Aconcagua) |
| Agrio | -38.47907 | 965 | (Agrio, Rio El Agrio, Agrio, Río El Agrio) |
| Agrio | -38.01631 | 348 | |
| Agua Blanca | -37.82077 | 347 | |
| Agua Blanca | -37.74336 | 570 | |
| Agua Buena | -34.14798 | 296 | |
| Agua Buena | -41.37776 | 40 | |
| Agua Buena | -40.93501 | 246 | |
| Agua Cascada | -37.12902 | 179 | |
| Agua Clara | -33.65 | 357 | |
| Aguada | -30.58235 | 228 | |
| Agua del Estero | -34.18909 | 673 | |
| Agua Enterrada | -38.73962 | 785 | |
| Agua Enterrada | -38.66432 | 1188 | (Agua Enterrada, Estero Agua Enterradas) |
| Agua Fresca | -53.40232 | 6 | (Agua Fresca, Agua Fresca, Rio Agua Fresco, Agua Fresca, Río de Agua Fresco) |
| Agua Fría | -41.14422 | 147 | |
| Agua Fría | -40.88381 | 142 | |
| Agua Fría | -37.38487 | 269 | |
| Agua Fría | -37.2564 | 164 | |
| Agua Fría | -33.6 | 369 | |
| Agua Grande | -37.5399 | 438 | |
| Agua | -33.82653 | 1861 | |
| Agua Pie | -37.24497 | 14 | (Agua Pie, Arroyo Agua Pié, Agua Pie) |
| Agua Santa | -38.49674 | 290 | |
| Aguas Blancas | -27.61308 | 2858 | |
| Aguas Blancas | -38.03663 | 363 | |
| Aguas Blancas | -22.52378 | 4264 | (Aguas Blancas, Arroyo Aquas Blancas) |
| Aguas Calientes | -23.08333 | 4248 | |
| Aguas Malas | -40.8842 | 224 | |
| Aguirrano | -33.71667 | 270 | |
| Agüita de los Leones | -36.45 | 81 | (Aguita los Leones, Estero Agüita de los Leones, Estero Burea, Estero Bureo, de Burea, de Burea) |
| Ahinco | -41.77333 | 14 | (Ahinco, Rio Llanco, Ahinco, Río Llanco) |
| Aillín | -37.56667 | 954 | |
| Aisen | -45.40424 | 9 | |
| Aisén | -45.40978 | 0 | (Aysen, Aysen) |
| Ajatama | -18.94752 | 2935 | |
| Alborrada | -37.31766 | 23 | (Alborrada, Alborrada, Alborrada) |
| Alcaldeo | -42.61728 | 15 | (Alcadeo, Ancalevo, Alcaldeo, Rio Alcaldes, Alcaldeo) |
| Aldunate | -46.71964 | 7 | |
| Alealebu | -43.16576 | 16 | |
| Alerce | -41.83999 | 60 | |
| Alerce | -43.07836 | 31 | |
| Alhueco | -38.58512 | 183 | |
| Alhué | -34.14323 | 108 | |
| Alicahue | -32.35 | 609 | (Alicahue) |
| Alinilahue | -38.9 | 102 | |
| Alitre | -31.95658 | 2771 | |
| Allinco | -39.02282 | 135 | |
| Allinco | -38.46452 | 70 | |
| Allipén | -39.01437 | 112 | Tolten Afluent |
| Allipén | -38.93859 | 2 | Estero Allipen |
| Almahue | -34.40349 | 164 | |
| Almendro | -31.39225 | 307 | (Almendro, Almendro) |
| Almendro | -31.01308 | 332 | (Almendro, Almendro) |
| Almendro | -31.01667 | 476 | (Almendro, Almendro) |
| Alonso de Morales | -34.25969 | 142 | |
| Alpehue | -38.84977 | 501 | (Alpahue, Rio Alpehue, Alpahue, Río Alpehue) |
| Alvarado | -34.17177 | 2503 | |
| Alvarado | -41.14404 | 136 | |
| Alvarado | -41.79693 | 19 | |
| Álvarez | -45.42496 | -2 | |
| Amancay | -41.25534 | 59 | |
| Amargo | -36.30273 | 688 | |
| Amargos | -38.07591 | 419 | |
| Amarillo | -53.44623 | 8 | |
| Amarillo | -46.82458 | 797 | |
| Amarillo | -43.07611 | 32 | |
| Amarillo | -41.37609 | 493 | |
| Améstica | -33.53451 | 150 | |
| Ana | -53.66703 | 5 | |
| Anay | -42.47178 | 12 | (Ahui, Rio Amay, Rio Anai, Rio Anay, Ahui, Río Anay) |
| Ancatraro | -38.26667 | 326 | |
| Ancoa | -35.91558 | 216 | |
| Ancoma | -18.1881 | 3644 | |
| Andalién | -36.73843 | 2 | (Andalien, Andalién) |
| Andimuen | -38.77892 | 17 | |
| Angachilla | -39.87905 | 0 | |
| Angostura | -33.78247 | 335 | |
| Angostura | -32.21003 | 2979 | |
| Anguillas | -37.44758 | 22 | |
| Añihué | -43.87649 | 26 | |
| Ánimas | -37.47372 | 173 | (Animas, Estero Ánimas, Animas, Animas) |
| Año Nuevo | -48.03545 | 50 | |
| Antamó | -41.44078 | 45 | |
| Antaro | -38.50394 | 335 | |
| Anticura | -40.66465 | 349 | |
| Antilhue | -39.5188 | 136 | (Antilhu, Rio Antilhue, Antilhu, Río Antilhue) |
| Antivero | -34.45945 | 247 | (Antivero, Antivero) |
| Antuco | -39 | 57 | |
| Antucol | -38.48908 | 31 | |
| Apretura | -41.61634 | 26 | |
| Aquellas | -42.57437 | 4 | |
| Arabilla | -19.25584 | 3787 | |
| Araucana | -36.97015 | 27 | (Araucana, Estero La Araucana) |
| Arco | -48.04157 | 54 | |
| Arco | -37.35373 | 95 | |
| Arena | -41.45339 | 75 | |
| Arenal | -35.90916 | 122 | |
| Arenas | -35.89691 | 336 | |
| Arhuelles | -34.16866 | 2460 | |
| Arilahuén | -37.57261 | 221 | |
| Arinco | -37.42484 | 82 | |
| Aroma | -19.98431 | 1115 | (Aroma, Aroma, Aroma) |
| Aros | -48.70017 | 252 | |
| Arquen | -37.96385 | 232 | |
| Arrayán | -41.39661 | 102 | (Arrayan, Estero Arrayán, Arrayan, Arrayan) |
| arredondo | -45.37349 | 205 | |
| Asasao | -43.36124 | 5 | |
| Aserradero Quemado | -47.04767 | 421 | |
| Astaburuaga | -27.47385 | 4135 | |
| Astil | -41.62208 | 54 | |
| Astillero | -41.76454 | 2 | |
| Atravesado | -37.17644 | 897 | |
| Aucayes | -33.53248 | 1141 | |
| Aucha | -41.7727 | 8 | (Aucha, Rio Aucho, Aucha) |
| Aucho | -42.06753 | 6 | (Aucho, Aucho, Aucho) |
| Aucó | -31.66667 | 258 | (Auco, Estero Aucó) |
| Aulén | -41.88173 | 1 | |
| Aullar | -41.75169 | 4 | |
| Auquinco | -38.16652 | 736 | (Auquinco, Bella Vista) |
| Avellano | -41.58333 | 5 | |
| Avellanos | -46.45749 | 460 | (Avellanas, Avellanas) |
| Avellanos | -37.1075 | 570 | |
| Ayacara | -42.3 | 37 | |
| Aychuco | -38.55 | 282 | |
| Ayentema | -43.40037 | 1 | |
| Azopardo | -54.47446 | 5 | (Azopardo, Rio Leopardo, Azopardo, Río Leopardo) |
| Azufre | -34.82615 | 1054 | |
| Azufre | -17.83879 | 3982 | |
| Azufre | -33.40048 | 2463 | (Azufre, Azufre, Azufre) |
| Azulado | -43.31479 | 218 | |
| Azul | -48.2673 | 419 | |
| Azul | -37.75008 | 630 | |
| Azul | -43.31505 | 218 | |
| Azul | -45.93636 | 336 | |
| Bagres | -36.33453 | 1210 | (Bagres, Bagres) |
| Baguales | -51.01683 | 84 | |
| Baguales | -45.50226 | 258 | (los Baguales) |
| Bahía Mala | -43.94339 | 34 | |
| Baker | -47.6256 | 28 | |
| Balboa | -45.92596 | 415 | (Balboa, Balboa) |
| Banchuto | -38.30406 | 810 | |
| Bancocura | -38.41026 | 906 | |
| Banco | -53.00465 | 174 | (Chorrillo Banco, Banco) |
| Bandurria | -50.7351 | 699 | |
| Baño | -46.48956 | 202 | |
| Baños | -35.93474 | 1577 | |
| Barceló | -42.48551 | 21 | |
| Barceló | -42.45194 | 58 | |
| Bariloche | -41.2374 | 233 | |
| Barrancas | -42.11767 | 436 | |
| Barranco | -50.71758 | 527 | (Barranco, Rio Barrancos, Barranco, Río Barrancos) |
| Barranco | -41.53622 | 435 | |
| Barranco | -39.12688 | 177 | |
| Barranco | -38.9837 | 99 | |
| Barrancos | -47.5141 | 91 | |
| Barrán | -37.12144 | 507 | |
| Barraza | -32.0027 | 3202 | |
| Barros | -37.95312 | 12 | |
| Barros Negros | -33.33333 | 2640 | |
| Barroso | -50.72416 | 562 | |
| Barroso | -35.30776 | 1004 | |
| Barroso | -35.3176 | 1171 | |
| Barroso | -34.09479 | 2107 | |
| Barroso | -35.70971 | 1297 | (Barros, Barroso) |
| Barrozo | -38.9862 | 95 | |
| Bataco | -37.54242 | 700 | |
| Batalcura | -42.21417 | 73 | |
| Batchelor | -53.56039 | 12 | (Barchelot, Rio Batchelor, Rio Massacre, Rio Bachiller, Rio del Gran Valle, Batchelor) |
| Batuco | -38.74229 | 139 | |
| Batuco | -35.73835 | 96 | |
| Batuco | -35.64927 | 34 | |
| Batuco | -35.28277 | 46 | |
| Batuco | -33.22392 | 507 | |
| Bautista | -53.59582 | 9 | (Baustismo, Rio Bautismo, Rio Bautista, Baustismo, Río Bautismo, Río Bautista) |
| Bayo | -27.38333 | 4458 | |
| Beatriz | -46.35332 | 16 | |
| Belbun | -36.47536 | 597 | |
| Belco | -35.86454 | 121 | |
| Bellavista | -52.86905 | 83 | (Bellavista, Bella Vista, Bella Vista) |
| Bellavista | -39.6067 | 4 | |
| Bellavista | -36.63347 | 9 | |
| Bellavista | -43.17853 | 327 | |
| Bermejo | -37.08333 | 103 | |
| Bernardina | -41.40517 | 68 | |
| Bertrand | -46.96994 | 204 | |
| Betbeder | -54.53116 | 29 | |
| Biobío | -36.81667 | 0 | (Biobio, Biobío) |
| Blanco Arenal | -41.04837 | 54 | (Blanco, Rio Blanco Arenal, Blanco, Río Blanco Arenal) |
| Blanco | -18.92766 | 3632 | |
| Blanco | -18.83797 | 4260 | |
| Blanco | -53.9291 | 111 | |
| Blanco | -53.68801 | 7 | |
| Blanco | -46.56358 | 543 | |
| Blanco | -45.43123 | 13 | |
| Blanco | -41.97088 | 3 | |
| Blanco | -41.67518 | 5 | |
| Blanco | -41.51667 | -9999 | |
| Blanco | -41.43515 | 242 | |
| Blanco | -41.25897 | 44 | |
| Blanco | -41.13973 | 190 | |
| Blanco | -41.22413 | 55 | |
| Blanco | -40.95962 | 217 | |
| Blanco | -40.89303 | 160 | |
| Blanco | -40.86743 | 54 | |
| Blanco | -40.4628 | 700 | |
| Blanco | -38.49941 | 560 | |
| Blanco | -38.44043 | 434 | |
| Blanco | -36.26663 | 649 | |
| Blanco | -35.93385 | 1521 | |
| Blanco | -34.24094 | 1483 | |
| Blanco | -34.08935 | 2032 | |
| Blanco | -32.90944 | 1423 | |
| Blanco | -32.5232 | 2860 | (Blanco, Estero Leiva, Blanco, Blanco) |
| Blanco | -32.20416 | 2952 | |
| Blanco | -19.84904 | 4042 | |
| Blanco | -18.32644 | 4376 | |
| Blanco | -29.13692 | 2352 | (Blanco, Blanco) |
| Blanco | -18.46667 | 4197 | (Blanco, Blanco) |
| Blanco | -38.42036 | 68 | |
| Blanco | -37.26879 | 800 | |
| Blanco | -41.95778 | 186 | |
| Blanco | -42.64888 | 39 | |
| Blanco | -43.11332 | 412 | |
| Blanco | -43.34665 | 191 | |
| Blanco | -45.70234 | 150 | |
| Blanco | -45.83693 | 511 | |
| Blanco Las Cascadas | -41.08924 | 55 | |
| Blanquillo | -37.08996 | 1057 | (Blanquillo, Blanquillo) |
| Boca del Maule | -36.99929 | 13 | (Boca Maule, Rio Boca Maule, Boca Maule, Río Boca del Maule) |
| Boecho | -41.4 | 22 | |
| Boleadores | -51.66678 | 4 | (Boleadoras, Rio Boleadores, Boleadoras, Río Boleadores) |
| Bolleco | -38.63798 | 73 | (Bolleco, Estero Boyeco) |
| Bolleco | -38.51667 | 219 | |
| Bolleco | -38.12265 | 84 | |
| Bolleco | -38.01754 | 86 | |
| Bollico | -38.89743 | 4 | (Bollico, Estero Bollilco) |
| Bollilco | -38.82459 | 40 | |
| Bolsillo | -32.50661 | 2976 | |
| Bolsiquillo | -40.41403 | 195 | |
| Bongo | -45.65389 | 397 | |
| Boñipen | -38.27228 | 966 | |
| Bonito | -40.88794 | 127 | |
| Bonito | -40.6636 | 1310 | |
| Boquerihue | -38.43574 | 20 | (Boquerihue, Estero Boquerino) |
| Boquiamargo | -37.8685 | 468 | (Boquiamarga, Estero Boquiamargo) |
| Boquil | -34.86874 | 24 | |
| Bordalí | -44.18181 | 68 | |
| Boroa | -39.2367 | 4 | |
| Boroa | -38.8082 | 40 | |
| Bórquez | -48.26169 | 17 | |
| Bosque | -46.1234 | 301 | |
| Boston | -48.05379 | 399 | |
| Botacura | -36.04469 | 1491 | (Botacura, Botacura) |
| Botalcura | -35.28477 | 66 | |
| Botella | -41.37585 | 468 | |
| Botica | -36.27905 | 1469 | |
| Botrolhue | -38.75676 | 81 | (Bolsolhue, Estero Botrolhue) |
| Boyacura | -38.47826 | 154 | (Bolacura, Estero Boyacura) |
| Boyén | -36.64979 | 118 | |
| Bravo | -48.68333 | 1604 | |
| Bravo | -47.96464 | 212 | |
| Bravo | -42.68729 | 6 | |
| Bravo | -35.933 | 1909 | (Bravo, Bravo) |
| Brown | -47.26688 | 310 | |
| Buchoco | -38.63002 | 76 | |
| Buchupureo | -36.0785 | 6 | (Buchupureo, Buchupureo, Buchupureo) |
| Budi Chico | -38.83214 | 1 | |
| Budi | -38.82556 | 5 | |
| Budi | -38.94718 | 5 | |
| Bueno | -40.2446 | 1 | |
| Buenuraqui | -37.22053 | 54 | |
| Bueras | -53.14417 | 279 | |
| Buill | -42.41137 | 9 | (Buill, Rio Huell, Buill) |
| Buitre | -44.5923 | 583 | |
| Bulelco | -37.35043 | 27 | |
| Bulí | -36.30048 | 158 | |
| Bulileo | -36.56469 | 421 | |
| Bulleco | -37.57101 | 91 | (Bolaca, Estero Bolleco, Estero Bulleco) |
| Bullilco | -36.60714 | 480 | |
| Bullileo | -36.2375 | 468 | |
| Bulluco | -38.42028 | 114 | (Balluco, Estero Bulluco) |
| Bureo | -37.58039 | 77 | |
| Bureo | -36.57055 | 204 | (Bureo, Estero Bustamante) |
| Bureo | -35.87372 | 112 | |
| Burgos | -46.54327 | 220 | |
| Burime | -38.65 | 81 | |
| Burras | -31.51059 | 1161 | |
| Burriqueces | -37.11186 | 455 | (Burriqueces, Estero Burriquetes) |
| Burro Chico | -41.04693 | 121 | |
| Burro | -41.00392 | 90 | (El Burro, Burro, Burro) |
| Butaco | -37.97652 | 517 | |
| Butaco | -38.70501 | 8 | |
| Butaco | -38.52355 | 208 | |
| Butalcura | -42.09085 | 3 | |
| Buta Palena | -43.76764 | 1 | (Buta Palena, Rio Carrenleufu, Rio Corcobado, Rio Corcovado, Rio Palena, Buta Palena, Río Carrenleufú, Río Corcobado, Río Corcovado, Río Palena) |
| Caballo Blanco | -35.7662 | 197 | |
| Cabrera | -37.38932 | 60 | (Cabrera, Cabrera, Rio Cabrere, Cabrera, Río Cabrere) |
| Cabrera | -37.39013 | 225 | |
| Cabrera | -35.30858 | 735 | |
| Cabrería | -37.81634 | 52 | (Cabreria, Arroyo Cabrería, Cabreria, Estero Cabrería, Butamalal, Butamalal) |
| Cachaco | -30.75541 | 134 | |
| Cachantun | -34.28333 | 313 | |
| Cachapoal | -34.27486 | 113 | (Cachapoal, Cachapoal) |
| Cachidivoill | -37.7 | 1469 | |
| Cachimba | -41.2782 | 252 | |
| Cacique Blanco | -44.27513 | 275 | |
| Cahuentué | -37.97759 | 91 | |
| Cahuinhue | -39.37307 | 112 | |
| Caicaén | -41.79613 | 1 | (Caicaen, Estero Caicaén) |
| Caico | -19.10006 | 4080 | (Caico, Caico, Quebrada Cajco) |
| Caicupil | -37.82274 | 38 | (Caicupil, Rio Cayucupil, Caicupil, Río Cayucupil) |
| Caihuico | -38.86667 | 101 | |
| Cailaco | -38.71667 | 138 | |
| Caillihue | -37.50713 | 79 | |
| Caiván | -35.44469 | 83 | |
| Cajòn Blanco | -45.86372 | 415 | |
| Cajòn Bravo | -45.80619 | 575 | |
| Cajón Chico | -38.3468 | 981 | (Cajon Chico, Cajón Chico, Cajon Chico) |
| Cajón de Los Ángeles | -32.51667 | 382 | (Cajon Los Angeles, Estero Cajon de los Anjeles, Estero Cajón de Los Ángeles, Estero Cajón de los Anjeles, Los Anjeles) |
| Cajones | -35.15535 | 1164 | |
| Cajón Grande | -38.34724 | 981 | (Cajon Grande, Cajón Grande, Cajon Grande) |
| Cajón | -38.42512 | 377 | |
| Cajón Infiernillo | -32.09329 | 195 | (Cajon Infiernillo, Cajón Infiernillo, Maquis) |
| Cajonmó | -41.41667 | 183 | |
| Calabozo | -41.38664 | 29 | |
| Calabozo | -39.68666 | 19 | |
| Calabozo | -37.58959 | 134 | (Calabazo, Calabozo) |
| Calabozo | -35 | 365 | |
| Calafate | -52.64257 | 8 | |
| Calajualla | -19.71585 | 3670 | |
| Calbuco | -38.69316 | 467 | |
| Calbuco | -37.64464 | 102 | (Calbuco) |
| Calcaco | -37.93395 | 299 | |
| Calcurrupe | -40.22078 | 64 | (Calcurrupe, Calcurrupe) |
| Caldera | -33.74219 | 1106 | |
| Caldo Verde | -35.85264 | 118 | |
| Caletón | -33.88333 | 1518 | |
| Caleu | -33.02009 | 687 | |
| Caliboro | -37.24562 | 89 | (Cariboro, Calri, Rio Caliboro, de Caliboro) |
| Caliente | -41.3 | 584 | |
| Callao | -40.88621 | 131 | |
| Callecalle | -39.82185 | 2 | |
| Calle | -36.10361 | 2181 | |
| Calleuque | -34.37734 | 119 | (Guirivilco, Estero Gurivllo, Estero Calleuque, Guiribilo) |
| Callín | -37.8211 | 118 | (Callin, Rio Collin, Callín, Río Collin) |
| Callín | -37.81225 | 34 | |
| Callumapu | -39.72221 | 6 | (Callumapu, Rio Cayumapu, Callumapu, Río Cayumapu) |
| Calminahua | -40.30812 | 6 | (Calminahua, Rio Calminahue, Calminahua, Río Calminahue) |
| Calonje | -41.9896 | 14 | |
| Calquinco | -39.69721 | 210 | (Calquinco, Calquinco, Calquinco) |
| Calvino | -32.76667 | 869 | |
| Calzoncillo | -40.84639 | 123 | |
| Camahueto | -41.28428 | 53 | (Camahueto, Rio Tempe, Camahueto, Río Tempe) |
| Camahueto | -42.80428 | 20 | (Camahueto, Rio Vilcun, Camahueto, Río Vilcún) |
| Camare | -38.77395 | 77 | (Camare, Estero Camore) |
| Camarico | -36.02353 | 146 | (Camarica, Camarico) |
| Camarones | -19.19334 | 12 | (Camarones Gully, Camarones, Quebrada Camarones, Camarones, Camarones) |
| Camisas | -31.76955 | 382 | (Camisas) |
| Campamento | -37.53127 | 1468 | |
| Campana | -43.62868 | 31 | |
| Campanario | -52.93329 | 108 | (Campanario, Campanario, Campanario) |
| Campiche | -32.7525 | 7 | (Campiche, Estero Compiche) |
| Campusano | -35.30399 | 170 | |
| Cañadón Grande | -52.2 | -9999 | (Canadon Grande, Cañadón Grande, Butterfly, Butterfly) |
| Canaleta | -31.3834 | 2557 | |
| Cañal | -41.05833 | 97 | |
| Cañalhué | -42.67446 | 5 | |
| Cañas Dulce | -36.47904 | 82 | |
| Cancagua | -40.43986 | 227 | |
| Cancha Rayada | -41.00983 | 91 | |
| Cancura | -38.78126 | 31 | |
| Cancura | -37.8041 | 78 | |
| Candelaria | -45.48601 | 33 | |
| Canela | -31.58396 | 31 | |
| Canelo | -43.3286 | 31 | (Canelo, Rio Canelos, Canelo) |
| Canelos | -38.85 | 431 | |
| Cañete | -35.30268 | 102 | |
| Canev | -43.4154 | 5 | (Canef, Rio Canev, Canef, Río Canev) |
| Cañicú | -37.7 | 820 | |
| Cañicura | -37.62972 | 526 | |
| Cañicura | -37.52073 | 374 | |
| Cañileo | -37.48008 | 470 | |
| Canileufu | -40.14004 | 143 | |
| Cañones | -41.41199 | 9 | |
| Cañón | -45.20236 | 244 | |
| Cantarrana | -37.50586 | 306 | |
| Cantuco | -38.83333 | 534 | |
| Caona | -35.09994 | 1503 | |
| Captrén | -38.49214 | 540 | (Catren, Captren, Rio Catren, Captrén, Río Catrén) |
| Caquena | -17.94306 | 4203 | |
| Caracarani | -17.92467 | 3821 | (Caracarani, Quebrada Caracharani, Caracarani, Caracarani) |
| Caracoles | -37.07656 | 1154 | |
| Caracol | -40.46352 | 55 | |
| Caracol | -38.37654 | 1103 | |
| Caramávida | -37.7153 | 69 | (Caramavida, Rio Curamavida, Rio Curamávida, Rio Grande, Caramávida, Río Grande) |
| Carampangue | -37.23402 | 3 | |
| Cárcamo | -41.48481 | 4 | |
| Cardonal | -34.83675 | 10 | |
| Carén | -38.88029 | 545 | |
| Carén | -31.56099 | 1000 | |
| Carén | -33.27721 | 288 | |
| Carén | -34.1162 | 251 | (Caren, Estero Carén) |
| Carimáhuida | -40.23302 | 1 | |
| Carinancagua | -38.35464 | 1022 | (Carinancagua, Estero Cormancagua) |
| Carinueico | -42.2438 | 28 | |
| Caripilún | -37.30232 | 12 | |
| Cariquilda | -41.61687 | 1 | |
| Cariquima | -19.32728 | 3679 | |
| Caritaya | -18.94782 | 2885 | |
| Carmelito | -33.75 | 338 | |
| Carmen | -28.75282 | 786 | |
| Caronte | -44.68 | 587 | |
| Carpa | -40.74006 | 579 | |
| Carranco | -39.75813 | 312 | (Caranco, Rio Carranco, Caranco, Río Carranco) |
| Carrera | -53.14215 | 281 | (Carrera, Estero Carreras) |
| Carretón | -35.13333 | 240 | |
| Carrileufú | -39.25122 | 277 | |
| Carrileufú | -39.30546 | 294 | |
| Carrizal | -34.43371 | 145 | |
| Carrizo | -33.158 | 207 | |
| Carrizo | -31.42728 | 2114 | |
| Cartagena | -33.53063 | 5 | |
| Cartagena | -34.19393 | 185 | (Carjena, Estero Cartagena, Estero Cartajena) |
| Carvajal | -33.42847 | 108 | (Carrajal, Estero Carvajal, Estero Carvajal) |
| Casa Blanca | -40.86342 | 135 | |
| Casablanca | -33.27884 | 5 | (Casablanca, Estero Casablanca) |
| Casa de Lata | -53.22668 | 10 | (Casa Lata, Casa de Lata) |
| Casa de Piedra | -32.84649 | 1292 | |
| Casas Viejas | -32.6 | 65 | |
| Cascada | -43.35076 | 80 | |
| Cashicue | -40.6989 | 39 | |
| Casitas | -41.35095 | 50 | (Casita, Estero Casitas) |
| Caspana | -22.27673 | 3033 | |
| Castillo | -36.25092 | 582 | |
| Castillo | -36.10801 | 1408 | |
| Castillo | -33.68333 | 367 | |
| Catalina | -37.24287 | 181 | |
| Catalina | -37.24244 | 213 | |
| Catalinas | -37.09337 | 1189 | |
| Catamutún | -40.09369 | 79 | |
| Catapilco | -32.63251 | 10 | |
| Catarata | -47.71531 | 342 | |
| Catemu | -32.79839 | 398 | (Catemu) |
| Catiao | -42.85021 | 6 | |
| Cato | -38.04715 | 371 | |
| Cato | -36.55243 | 124 | |
| Catribolí | -37.73011 | 42 | |
| Catrileufu | -39.95265 | 17 | |
| Catrimalal | -38.09608 | 131 | |
| Cau Cau | -39.79561 | 4 | |
| Caudal | -36.5282 | 66 | (Caudal, Caudal, Rio Coudal, Caudal, Río Coudal) |
| Caunahue | -40.17997 | 64 | |
| Cauquenes | -35.88232 | 115 | |
| Cautín | -38.7531 | 15 | (Cauten, Cautin, Cautín) |
| Cauyahué | -42.66667 | 2 | |
| Cavilolén | -31.86786 | 76 | |
| Cavisañi | -39.33406 | 371 | |
| Cayucupil | -37.82129 | 36 | (Conhueco, Conhueco, Cayucupil, Cayucupil) |
| Cayulafquen | -38.43937 | 940 | |
| Cayunco | -38.47098 | 915 | |
| Cazadero | -28.76946 | 2721 | (Cazadero, Rio Cazadero, Cazadero, Río del Cazadero) |
| Cebadal | -41.58359 | 7 | |
| Cenicero | -31.47053 | 1463 | |
| Cenizas | -43.1361 | 407 | |
| Centenario | -53.37531 | 4 | |
| Centinela | -41.09676 | 121 | |
| Centinela | -38.60879 | 32 | |
| Centinela | -37.33813 | 102 | |
| Centinela | -37.29068 | 514 | |
| Cepo | -33.3839 | 1926 | (Cepo, Capo, Rio del Cepo, de Capo, Río del Cepo) |
| Cerro Blanco | -31.80498 | 1885 | |
| Chabunco | -53.0182 | 3 | (Chabunco, Chabunco, Chabunco) |
| Chacabuco | -47.12761 | 94 | (Chacabuco Confluent du rio Baker) |
| Chacabuco | -33.2006 | 520 | |
| Chacabuco | -47.08392 | 244 | |
| Chacahue | -37.90685 | 167 | |
| Chacaico | -38.1028 | 278 | (Chacaico, Estero Cullinco) |
| Chacai | -32.4 | 2032 | |
| Chacaracón | -38.48422 | 56 | (Chacanacon, Estero Chacanacón, Estero Chacaracon, Estero Chacaracón, Estero Chacayracon) |
| Chacayal | -33.44931 | 2051 | |
| Chacay | -30.9182 | 1466 | |
| Chacay | -30.40501 | 933 | (Chacay, Chacay, Rio de Chacai, Chacay, Río de Chacai) |
| Chacay | -37.35652 | 94 | (Chacai, Chacay) |
| Chacay | -37.31225 | 160 | |
| Chacras Buenas | -38.11819 | 100 | |
| Chada | -39.04431 | 86 | |
| Chadmo | -42.94224 | 5 | |
| Chagres | -35.25769 | 174 | |
| Chagua | -19.21667 | 4225 | |
| Chagual | -41.83481 | 9 | (Chagual, Chagual, Rio Chaque, Chagual, Río Chaque) |
| Chaguane | -19.1993 | 4060 | (Manantial Chaguane, Chaguane, Chaguane) |
| Chaguane | -19.2 | 4095 | |
| Chahuico | -40.74038 | 61 | |
| Chaica | -41.60824 | 4 | (Chaica, Rio Chaula, Rio Chauta, Chaica, Río Chaula, Río Chauta) |
| Chaichahuen | -40.46441 | 102 | |
| Chaiguata | -43.13095 | 4 | (Chaiguala, Rio Chaiguata, Chaiguala, Río Chaiguata) |
| Chaihuín | -39.96502 | 60 | |
| Chailef | -39.0765 | 121 | (Chailef, Estero Chuilef) |
| Chaingal | -39.5 | 293 | |
| Chaitén o Rio Blanco | -42.90552 | 27 | |
| Chalaco | -32.50067 | 1196 | (Chalaco, Estero Chaco) |
| Chalinga | -31.77813 | 476 | |
| Chalipen | -39.50424 | 211 | |
| Challacura | -38.41667 | 260 | |
| Challoani | -18.20469 | 4391 | |
| Chamaca | -23.47886 | 4201 | (Chamaca, Chamaca) |
| Chamávida | -35.96667 | 248 | |
| Chamichaco | -38.06961 | 300 | |
| Champulle | -38.7086 | 10 | |
| Chamul | -40.32511 | 68 | (Chamul, Estero Chumu) |
| Chañar | -31.47344 | 1507 | |
| Chancacoya | -19.88606 | 3890 | |
| Chanchan | -40.72483 | 58 | |
| Chanchan | -39.80115 | 675 | |
| Chanchuco | -38.72256 | 1067 | |
| Chanco | -37.31667 | 429 | |
| Chanco | -37.10572 | 49 | |
| Chanco | -39.02376 | 61 | |
| Chanco | -38.67531 | 32 | |
| Chanco | -38.63333 | 29 | |
| Chanco | -38.31668 | 128 | (Chanco, Estero Coihueco) |
| Chanco | -38.25625 | 57 | |
| Chanco | -35.7607 | 9 | |
| Changaral | -36.60005 | 49 | |
| Changaral | -36.45636 | 106 | (Changaral, Estero Coronta) |
| Chanleufú | -40.67988 | 189 | |
| Chanleufú | -39.42966 | 176 | |
| Chanquin | -38.39442 | 68 | (Chanquin, Chanquin, Chanquin) |
| Chanquin | -38.13374 | 73 | (Chanquin, Chanquin, Chanquin) |
| Chaparano | -41.74626 | 8 | |
| Chapilcahuín | -40.50104 | 59 | |
| Chapille | -38.8174 | 5 | |
| Chapod | -38.83536 | 65 | |
| Chapuco | -39.90863 | 54 | |
| Chapuel | -38.63431 | 262 | (Chagual, Estero Chapuel) |
| Chaqueigua | -41.46325 | 19 | (Chaqueigua, Rio Chaqueihua, Chaqueigua, Río Chaqueihua) |
| Chaquiguan | -41.33333 | 253 | |
| Chaquihue | -41.1953 | 24 | |
| Chaquilvin | -38.06646 | 745 | (Chaquillin, Rio Chaquilvin, Chaquillin, Río Chaquilvin) |
| Charquicán | -34.51667 | 604 | |
| Charvinto | -19.84787 | 4000 | |
| Chauchil | -41.97544 | -1 | |
| Chaula | -41.60044 | 30 | |
| Chaullén | -40.33468 | 159 | (Chaullen, Estero Chaullue, Estero Chaullén) |
| Chauquiar | -41.82188 | 3 | |
| Chávez | -41.42682 | 104 | |
| Checat | -39.15179 | 810 | (Checat, Estero Checot) |
| Checo | -42.53794 | 134 | (Checo, Rio Denal, Checo, Río Deñal) |
| Checuen | -35.84828 | 108 | |
| Chegneaux | -53.70516 | 262 | |
| Chela | -21.44037 | 3566 | (Chela, Chela, Chela) |
| Chelle | -39.02709 | 12 | (Chelle, Chelle, Chelle) |
| Chelle | -36.8953 | 275 | |
| Chelles | -41.51313 | 1 | |
| Chencoihue | -41.68099 | 27 | |
| Cheñiu | -42.0036 | 3 | (Cheniu, Cheñiu) |
| Chepa | -41.37064 | 157 | |
| Chépica | -31.12833 | 1219 | (Chepica, Estero Chépica, Chepic, Quebrada Chepica, Quebrada Chépica) |
| Chépica | -31.13333 | 1274 | |
| Chepu | -42.04469 | 4 | |
| Chequellame | -38.51667 | 605 | |
| Chequén | -38.04148 | 245 | |
| Chequén | -34.38556 | 137 | |
| Chequenlemillo | -34.99989 | 208 | |
| Cherquenco | -38.0267 | 211 | (Chequenco, Estero Chequénco, Estero Cherquenco) |
| Chicauco | -38.0409 | 245 | |
| Chico | -53.68345 | 4 | (Carmen Silva, Rio Carmen Sylva, Rio Chico, Carmen Silva, Río Carmen Sylva, Río Chico) |
| Chico | -41.79959 | 4 | |
| Chico | -41.45 | 59 | |
| Chico | -41.4477 | 11 | |
| Chico | -41.4 | 345 | |
| Chico | -47.04478 | 207 | |
| Chico | -42.53472 | 111 | |
| Chico | -43.19699 | 313 | |
| Chico Nuevo | -42.49332 | 2 | |
| Chifin | -40.75371 | 47 | (Chitin, Chifin, Rio Chufin, Chifin, Río Chufin) |
| Chigualoco | -31.75316 | 7 | |
| Chilca | -41.64726 | 21 | |
| Chilcal | -22.28333 | 3143 | (Chilcal, Chilcal, Quebrada Chileal) |
| Chilcoco | -40.34524 | 151 | |
| Chilcoco | -37.22346 | 13 | |
| Chilco | -41.68949 | 21 | (Chilco, Rio Chileo, Chilco, Río Chileo) |
| Chilco | -38.39512 | 57 | |
| Chilicauquén | -32.78513 | 47 | |
| Chillancito | -37.18883 | 265 | |
| Chillán | -36.6033 | 52 | |
| Chillcon | -41.56762 | 4 | |
| Chillehue | -34.3 | 291 | |
| Chillico | -37.3638 | 61 | |
| Chimbarongo | -36.05 | 165 | |
| Chimbarongo | -34.54919 | 152 | (Chimbarongo, Chimbarongo, de Chimbarongo) |
| Chimpel | -37.6973 | 13 | |
| China | -53.16667 | 39 | |
| Chinchiguapi | -41.47602 | 11 | (Chinchiguapi, Chinchiguapi, Chinchiguapi) |
| Chinchin | -40.67023 | 195 | |
| Chincolco | -32.29638 | 1502 | (Chincolco, Chincolco) |
| Chingue | -40.95634 | 72 | |
| Chingue | -38.19049 | 168 | |
| Chinquiu | -41.5 | 118 | (Chincui, Rio Chinquiu, Chincui, Río Chinquiu) |
| Chioca | -40.6981 | 188 | |
| Chircos | -39.29085 | 227 | (Chircos, Chircos, Chircos) |
| Chirihuillin | -37.55805 | 47 | |
| Chirri | -40.43952 | 36 | (Chirre, Rio Chirri, Chirre, Río Chirri) |
| Chislluma | -17.72164 | 4180 | |
| Chivilingo | -37.14138 | 20 | (Chihuilleco, Rio Chivilingo, Chivilingo) |
| Choapa | -31.6224 | 1 | (Chuapa, Choapa, Rio Choapo, Choapa, Río Choapo) |
| Chocalán | -33.75 | 294 | (Acule, Estero Chocalar, Estero Chocalár, Estero Chocalan, Estero de Chocalán) |
| Chocalán | -33.73333 | 158 | |
| Choco | -39.82564 | 21 | |
| Cholchol | -38.75192 | 23 | |
| Cholchos | -40.46226 | 705 | |
| Cholgo | -42.06222 | 205 | |
| Cholguaco | -40.76845 | 7 | (Chalguaco, Rio Chalhuaco, Chalguaco, Río Chalhuaco) |
| Cholguahue | -37.54177 | 135 | (Cholguahue, Estero Cholhuahue) |
| Cholguán | -37.16552 | 237 | |
| Cholhue | -41.66469 | 1 | |
| Chollay | -28.973 | 1403 | (Cholay, Rio Chollai, Rio Chollay, Cholay, Río Chollai, Río Chollay) |
| Chollinco | -40.21106 | 72 | |
| Choroico | -37.54191 | 79 | (Choroico, Choroico) |
| Choroico | -40.87232 | 115 | |
| Choroico | -39.00434 | 172 | |
| Chorrillo Bitsh | -53.10178 | 13 | (Chorrillo Bitsh, Bistch, Estero Bitsh) |
| Chorrillo Corey | -53.03784 | 12 | (Chorrillo Corey, Corey) |
| Chorrillo del Medio | -53.03035 | 5 | (Chorrillo Medio, del Medio) |
| Chorrillo de los Alambres | -51.91021 | 12 | (Chorrillo los Alambres, Chorrillo de los Alambres, Rio de los Alambres, Chorrillo de los Alambres, Río de los Alambres) |
| Chorrillo El Manzano | -52.50684 | 113 | (Chorrillo El Manzano, Malpaso, Rio Manzano, Malpaso, Río Manzano) |
| Chorrillo El Salto | -52.5638 | 7 | (Chorrillo El Salto, El Salto, El Salto) |
| Chorrillo | -46.26949 | 208 | |
| Chorrillo La Leona | -52.4249 | 115 | (Chorrillo La Leona, Chorrillo Las Lomas, Las Lomas, Las Lomas) |
| Chorrillo Meric | -52.34572 | 7 | (Chorrillo Meric, Merjo) |
| Chorrillo Wagner | -52.4553 | 111 | (Chorrillo Wagner, la Jeannette, Jeannette) |
| Chovellén | -35.87694 | 20 | (Chovellen, Chovellen, Chovellén) |
| Chucaco | -38.88294 | 121 | |
| Chucagua | -41.80165 | 10 | |
| Chucahue | -41.70511 | 6 | |
| Chucauco | -38.8422 | 48 | |
| Chuchue | -34.4 | 297 | |
| Chuchuico | -37.36094 | 57 | |
| Chuengane | -39.42456 | 327 | |
| Chufquenpalemo | -38.8495 | 529 | |
| Chumil | -38.47997 | 317 | |
| Chumulco | -37.63366 | 99 | |
| Chupalla | -37.73648 | 59 | |
| Chuquiananta | -18.93896 | 3819 | (Chuquiananta, Chuquiananta, Chuquiananta, Chuquiananta) |
| Chusjavida | -18.57142 | 4064 | |
| Cieneguitas | -36.34909 | 813 | |
| Cifuentes | -37.47477 | 158 | |
| Cinco | -45.23205 | 505 | |
| Cinico | -40.59756 | 27 | |
| Cipresal | -42.59342 | 4 | |
| Cipreses | -42.6706 | 78 | (Cipreces, Rio Cipreses, Cipreces, Río Cipreses) |
| Cipreses | -36.49677 | 614 | (Cipreces, Cipreses) |
| Circo | -46.42792 | 58 | |
| Cisnes | -44.77014 | 19 | |
| Cisnes | -44.63757 | 519 | |
| Cisnes | -42.00478 | 9 | |
| Cisternas | -36.45524 | 1606 | (Cajon Cisternas, Cajón Cisternas, Cisternas, Cisternas) |
| Clarillo | -33.64503 | 607 | (El Clarillo, Clarillo, Clarillo) |
| Claro | -45.5881 | 343 | |
| Claro | -39.26023 | 217 | |
| Claro | -37.23266 | 67 | |
| Claro | -35.70637 | 504 | (Claro, Rio Olaro, Claro) |
| Claro | -35.46381 | 43 | |
| Claro | -34.9972 | 658 | |
| Claro | -34.67486 | 480 | |
| Claro | -34.39959 | 198 | |
| Claro | -34.27183 | 690 | |
| Claro | -33.92058 | 1558 | |
| Claro | -29.98323 | 804 | (Claro, Rio Derecho, Claro, Río Derecho) |
| Claro | -46.26399 | 215 | (Claro, Claro) |
| Claro | -37.36804 | 298 | |
| Claro | -36.83375 | 94 | |
| Claro Solar | -43.94661 | 74 | |
| Claudio Vicuña | -47.08018 | 401 | |
| Clonqui | -34.22676 | 837 | (Clonqui, Conqui) |
| Cobquecura | -36.14337 | 8 | |
| Cobre | -33.88547 | 1504 | |
| Cobre | -31.38333 | 2765 | |
| Cocalán | -34.2788 | 167 | |
| Cochamó | -41.50213 | -4 | (Cochamo, Rio Concha, Cochamó, Río Concha) |
| Cochicahuin | -38.64449 | 4 | (Cachicahuin, Estero Cochicahuin) |
| Cochiguas | -30.10152 | 1120 | |
| Cochino | -41.15 | 66 | (Cocaino, Rio Cochino, Cocaino, Río Cochino) |
| Cochrane | -53.914 | 75 | |
| Cochrane | -47.24708 | 142 | |
| Codegua | -33.97622 | 465 | |
| Codihue | -38.74844 | 161 | (Codihue, Rio Codinhue, Codihue, Río Codinhue) |
| Codihue | -38.68217 | 18 | |
| Cogotí | -30.86854 | 459 | |
| Cohueco | -38.51667 | 203 | |
| Coicoimallín | -37.7799 | 717 | (Coicoimallin, Estero Coicoimallín, Estero Coicomallin, Estero Coicomallín) |
| Coihaique | -45.55926 | 331 | (Coyhaique) |
| Coihueco | -40.78416 | 126 | |
| Coihueco | -40.77148 | 70 | |
| Coihueco | -40.97896 | 133 | |
| Coihueco | -40.55153 | 197 | |
| Coihueco | -39.73657 | 135 | |
| Coihueco | -39.10868 | 490 | |
| Coihueco | -38.72666 | 106 | |
| Coihueco | -38.58045 | 183 | |
| Coihueco | -38.54629 | 225 | (Callimuco, Estero Coihueco, Estero Collimuco) |
| Coihueco | -38.52037 | 206 | (Cohueco, Estero Coihueco) |
| Coihueco | -38.48333 | 524 | |
| Coihueco | -38.34864 | 55 | (Coihueco, Estero Loihueco) |
| Coihueco | -38.08518 | 9 | |
| Coihueco | -37.78391 | 346 | |
| Coihueco | -37.78009 | 39 | |
| Coihueco | -37.63737 | 61 | |
| Coihueco | -37.51038 | 304 | |
| Coihueco | -36.56578 | 192 | |
| Coihueco | -35.76667 | 197 | |
| Coihue | -37.62116 | 180 | |
| Coihue | -37.08367 | 193 | |
| Coihue | -39.39815 | 95 | |
| Coihue | -38.90265 | 55 | (Coihue, Coihue) |
| Coihue | -37.50229 | 76 | |
| Coihue | -41.40996 | 257 | |
| Coihuequito | -37.78736 | 418 | |
| Coihuín | -41.46667 | 108 | |
| Coihuín | -41.49963 | 4 | (Chamiza, Rio Coihuin, Chamiza, Río Coihuín) |
| Coilaco | -38.69752 | 17 | |
| Coilaco | -38.11122 | 171 | |
| Coilico | -38.69872 | 15 | (Coilico, Collinco, Collinco) |
| Coinco | -40.49753 | 10 | |
| Coiparahue | -38.86667 | 1298 | (Coiparahue) |
| Coipo | -36.00136 | 132 | (Coipo, Coipo, Coipo) |
| Coipo | -41.36233 | 133 | |
| Coipué | -39.0644 | 15 | |
| Coipué | -38.11033 | 152 | |
| Coipué | -35.24816 | 31 | |
| Coique | -40.14876 | 70 | (Coihue, Rio Coique, Coihue, Río Coique) |
| Coique | -40.86847 | 137 | |
| Coiquencillo | -36.32929 | 101 | (Coiquencillo, Estero Colquecillo) |
| Colana | -21.98333 | 3848 | (Colana, Colana) |
| Colca | -19.24937 | 4145 | (Colca, Colca) |
| Colchagua | -37.19191 | 57 | |
| Colchane | -19.69506 | 4161 | |
| Colchón | -45.29646 | 555 | |
| Colcuma | -38.32686 | 10 | |
| Cole-Cole | -42.50767 | 8 | |
| Colegual | -41.3673 | 36 | (Colegual, Rio Coligual, Colegual) |
| Colegual | -39.81628 | 197 | (Coleguai, Estero Colegual) |
| Colhue | -34.53349 | 167 | |
| Colicheo | -36.96608 | 98 | |
| Colico | -39.04722 | 295 | |
| Colico | -38.71905 | 113 | |
| Colico | -37.41436 | 132 | |
| Colico | -37.29 | 92 | |
| Coligual | -40.83124 | 85 | |
| Coligue | -32.57607 | 77 | |
| Colihue | -31.37276 | 403 | (Colihue, Estero Colihue) |
| Colina | -33.38527 | 470 | (Colina, Estero Colina, Colina, Colina) |
| Colina | -33.85571 | 2485 | (Colina, Colina, de Colina) |
| Coliqueo | -38.02313 | 1131 | (Colicheo, Rio Coliqueo, Colicheo, Río Coliqueo) |
| Coliumo | -36.60417 | 77 | |
| Collacagua | -20.28543 | 3790 | (Collacagua, Rio de Collacugua, de Collacagua) |
| Collaco | -39.25845 | 341 | |
| Collahue | -38.8198 | 89 | |
| Collahue | -38.22979 | 544 | |
| Collanco | -38.46541 | 148 | (Coyanco, Collanco, Estero Coyanco) |
| Collén | -36.61667 | 16 | |
| Collico | -38.48044 | 510 | |
| Collícura | -38.48333 | 919 | |
| Colliguanqui | -38.41552 | 385 | (Coliguanqui, Estero Colliguanqui, Estero Collihuanqui) |
| Colliguay | -37.08064 | 38 | |
| Colliguay | -37.09771 | 93 | (Colliguai, Estero Colliguay) |
| Colliguay | -36.29311 | 171 | (Colliguay, Estero Colliquai, Estero Colliquay) |
| Collihueco | -38.58902 | 258 | (Colihueco, Estero Collihueco) |
| Collihué | -41.77122 | 18 | (Collihue, Estero Collihué, Estero Codihue, Estero de Codihué) |
| Collihuinco | -41.04726 | 48 | |
| Collileufu | -39.85849 | 24 | |
| Collileufu | -38.86458 | 1 | |
| Collil | -42.60303 | 43 | |
| Collimallín | -38.58031 | 38 | |
| Collinco | -38.73333 | 198 | (Collinco, Collinco, Collinco) |
| Collinco | -40.37902 | 329 | |
| Collins | -38.56478 | 189 | (Callin, Rio Collin, Rio Collins, Callin, Río Collin, Río Collins) |
| Collipulli | -38.25783 | 88 | |
| Collochue | -38.03743 | 1302 | |
| Colmuyao | -36.2377 | 4 | |
| Colo | -38.1905 | 275 | |
| Colomávida | -36.25707 | 131 | |
| Colorado | -26.93472 | 3754 | |
| Colorado | -48.32786 | 266 | |
| Colorado | -41.47504 | 28 | (Colorado, Colorado, Colorado) |
| Colorado | -41.23333 | 66 | (Colorado, Rio Nutria, Colorado, Río Nutria) |
| Colorado | -40.86645 | 131 | |
| Colorado | -40.40124 | 467 | |
| Colorado | -38.56667 | 706 | |
| Colorado | -37.36667 | 138 | |
| Colorado | -35.27401 | 603 | |
| Colorado | -33.596 | 893 | |
| Colorado | -32.8549 | 1152 | |
| Colorado | -30.97615 | 2063 | |
| Colorado | -30.78333 | 2707 | |
| Colorado | -30.25642 | 3171 | |
| Colorado | -41.46667 | 43 | |
| Colorado | -38.44962 | 1173 | |
| Colorado | -35.28968 | 39 | |
| Colorado | -34.55398 | 2024 | (Colorado, Colorado) |
| Colorado | -32.07616 | 1898 | |
| Colorado | -46.6184 | 1079 | |
| Colorado | -41.4262 | 269 | |
| Colpi | -38.3548 | 43 | (Colpi, Rio Panqueco, Rio Panquenco, Colpi, Río Panqueco, Río Panquenco) |
| Coltón | -36.76141 | 107 | |
| Coltúe | -38.85075 | 142 | |
| Coluco | -42.10751 | 2 | |
| Colú | -42.2448 | -9999 | (Colu, Estero Colú, Colu, Colú) |
| Columpios del Diablo | -32.52937 | 2654 | |
| Colún | -40.08359 | 27 | |
| Comalle | -34.86812 | 219 | |
| Combarbalá | -31.112 | 719 | |
| Come Caballos | -27.98333 | 3659 | (Come Caballos, Come Caballos) |
| Comoe | -38.88333 | 5 | |
| Compu | -42.82967 | 33 | |
| Compu | -42.87199 | 5 | |
| Comul | -39.06985 | 70 | |
| Comunero | -32.85 | 391 | |
| Conay | -28.94796 | 1551 | (Conai, Rio Conay, Conai, Río Conay) |
| Concagua | -40.55918 | 27 | |
| Conca | -35.13596 | 9 | |
| Concaven | -34.91596 | 34 | |
| Concha | -41.28193 | 229 | (Concha, Rio Huenohueno, Concha, Río Huenohueno) |
| Conchali | -31.88024 | 6 | |
| Concordia | -53.3821 | 16 | |
| Cóndor | -45.58834 | 24 | |
| Condor | -45.47386 | 7 | |
| Condorire | -18.03114 | 4347 | |
| Conguil | -39.72039 | 135 | |
| Coñico | -40.91403 | 107 | |
| Coñico | -39.82575 | 131 | |
| Conquehue | -38.26417 | 383 | |
| Contao | -41.79182 | 1 | |
| Contento | -42.65741 | 3 | |
| Contrafuerte | -40.40554 | 299 | |
| Contra | -40.33232 | 18 | |
| Conumo | -37.26884 | 13 | (Conumo, Rio Conumu, Conumo, Río Conumu) |
| Copahue | -37.78333 | 1285 | |
| Copiapó | -27.31397 | 8 | (Copiapo, Copiapó) |
| Copihue | -41.24631 | 100 | |
| Copihuelpi | -39.37002 | 213 | |
| Copinco | -37.1873 | 55 | |
| Coquiao | -41.95603 | 6 | |
| Coquimbito | -32.83921 | 314 | |
| Coquimbo | -35.01667 | 49 | |
| Corcovado | -43.25727 | 9 | (Colorado, Rio Corcovado, Rio Corobado, Colorado, Río Corcovado) |
| Cordillera Ferrosa | -33.2318 | 2962 | |
| Cordillera | -41.39345 | 110 | |
| Cordón Blanco | -43.68216 | 145 | |
| Coreo | -37.56288 | 151 | (Coreo, Coreo, Coreo) |
| Corico | -31.55143 | 481 | |
| Corneche | -33.96746 | 32 | |
| Coronel | -36.04489 | 150 | |
| Coronta | -36.49859 | 79 | (Coronta, Estero Corontas) |
| Correltué | -39.58454 | 187 | (Coreltue, Estero Correltue, Estero Correltué) |
| Correntoso | -45.47506 | 232 | (Grande) |
| Correntoso | -43.99471 | 21 | |
| Correntoso | -41.55 | 484 | (Correntoso, Correntoso, Correntoso) |
| Correntoso | -41.46239 | 73 | |
| Correntoso | -37.5 | 1411 | |
| Correntoso | -42.95714 | 2 | |
| Correntoso | -43.25054 | 46 | |
| Correntoso | -42.06778 | 455 | |
| Correntoso | -41.40521 | 39 | |
| Cortaderal | -34.3661 | 1203 | (Cortaderal, Rio las Cortaderas, Cortaderal, Río de las Cortaderas) |
| Cortado | -52.80314 | 3 | (Cortado, Cortado) |
| Cosapilla | -18.06667 | 4397 | |
| Coshue | -39.83 | 121 | |
| Cotase | -19.18333 | 3798 | |
| Cotrauco | -36.74747 | 176 | (Cotrauco, Estero Guanaco, Estero Guanco, Guauco) |
| Covarrubias | -33.39808 | 1275 | |
| Coya | -34.20764 | 779 | (Coya, Coya, Coya, Coya) |
| Coyanco | -33.73549 | 1368 | |
| Coyanco | -38.48924 | 306 | |
| Coyanco | -37.51909 | 63 | |
| Coyanco | -36.73082 | 57 | |
| Coyanco | -35.23333 | 9 | (Coyanco, Coyanco) |
| Coyán | -38.77417 | 879 | (C. Indio, Coyan, Coyán) |
| Coyo | -22.39458 | 3766 | |
| Cristales | -38.16894 | 728 | (Cristales, Cuchillahue, Cuchillahue) |
| Crucero | -40.88812 | 59 | (Crucero, Estero Crucero) |
| Cruces | -39.8208 | 0 | |
| Cruces (Santuario) | -39.77635 | 0 | |
| Cruz de Piedra | -34.1724 | 2487 | |
| Cuacua | -39.77329 | 198 | (Cuacua, Rio Cuaeua, Cuacua) |
| Cuarto Chorrillo | -52.67255 | 6 | (Cuarto Chorrillo, Cuarto Chorrillos, Cuarto, Cuarto) |
| Cuarto | -43.9395 | 119 | |
| Cubanaya | -19.12067 | 2962 | (Cubanaya, Arroyo de Cubayana, Cuanalla, Quebrada Cubanalla, Quebrada de Cubanaya) |
| Cucao | -38.41667 | 145 | (Coral, Estero Cucao) |
| Cuchacucha | -36.61715 | 42 | (Cucha, Estero Cuchacucha) |
| Cuchimalal | -39.74968 | 23 | |
| Cudico | -39.66146 | 2 | |
| Cudico | -38.81238 | 36 | (Codico, Estero Cudico) |
| Cuenca | -34.48251 | 362 | (Cuenca, Cuenca) |
| Cuervo | -41.22461 | 62 | |
| Cuesta Alta | -41.35016 | 349 | |
| Cuevas | -52.51667 | 578 | |
| Cuevas | -43.95938 | 13 | (Cuevas, Rio Water, Cuevas, Río Water) |
| Cuico | -39.29662 | 233 | |
| Cuicuileufu | -39.78588 | 11 | |
| Cuinco | -40.54527 | 13 | (Coinco, Estero Cuinco, Estero Cuyinco, Coyunco) |
| Cuitúe | -41.70984 | 14 | |
| Culenar | -34.17973 | 168 | (Culenar, Culenar, Quebrada Culenes) |
| Culenar | -36.56429 | 152 | |
| Culenar | -36.5285 | 74 | |
| Culenar | -35.11667 | 72 | |
| Culenco | -37.46769 | 60 | |
| Culenco | -36.98919 | 136 | (Culenco, Danicalqui) |
| Cullileo | -37.40724 | 79 | (Collileo, Cullileo, Collileo, Collileo) |
| Cullinco | -38.06667 | 277 | |
| Cullinco | -37.6699 | 84 | |
| Cululil | -41.56143 | 5 | |
| Cululir | -41.4547 | 8 | (Cuculin, Rio Cululin, Rio Cululir, Cuculin, Río Cululir) |
| Cumbli | -38.87873 | 120 | |
| Cumin | -39.29546 | 228 | |
| Cunaco | -35.81673 | 110 | |
| Cunamo | -40.51485 | 24 | |
| Cunco | -39.0553 | 656 | |
| Cunco | -38.93314 | 369 | |
| Cunco | -38.83333 | 92 | |
| Cunco | -38.66667 | 174 | |
| Cuncumén | -31.89675 | 986 | |
| Cuncumén | -33.76948 | 58 | |
| Cuncura | -38.21843 | 755 | |
| Cunlagua | -31.73317 | 765 | |
| Cuñocuño | -40.19652 | 76 | |
| Curacalpu | -38.93461 | 377 | |
| Curacalpu | -38.84778 | 621 | |
| Curaco | -39.02467 | 203 | |
| Curaco | -37.81667 | 57 | |
| Curaco | -37.71049 | 28 | (Curaco, Curaco, Curaco) |
| Curaco | -40.94773 | 211 | |
| Curaco | -40.49594 | 133 | |
| Curaco | -39.04698 | 305 | |
| Curaco | -38.72807 | 18 | |
| Curaco | -38.68314 | 28 | |
| Curaco | -38.67314 | 22 | |
| Curaco | -38.62797 | 29 | |
| Curaco | -38.52948 | 42 | |
| Curaco | -38.07717 | 263 | |
| Curaco | -37.93385 | 299 | |
| Curahuche | -39.68569 | 10 | |
| Curahué | -41.68333 | 1 | (Curahue, Curahue, Curahué) |
| Cura Mallín | -37.68333 | 1203 | (Infiernillo, Cura Mallin, Rio Curi Maullin, Cura Mallín, Río Curi Maullín) |
| Curamávida | -37.2067 | 54 | |
| Curañadú | -37.34746 | 130 | (Curanadu, Arroyo Curanadú, Curanadu, Estero Curañadú, Curanadu, Rio Curañadú) |
| Curanco | -38.03333 | 284 | |
| Curanilahue | -37.57092 | 40 | |
| Curanilahue | -38.06667 | 67 | |
| Curanilahue | -38.03253 | 8 | (Curanilahue, Estero Curanilhue, Curanilahue, Curanilahue) |
| Curanipe | -35.84274 | 55 | |
| Curapalihue | -36.7934 | 92 | (Curapalihue, Estero Dadi) |
| Curavipi | -38.12602 | 142 | |
| Curichapa | -38.73333 | 144 | |
| Curiche | -37.58119 | 186 | |
| Curicó | -37.59918 | 17 | |
| Curi | -42.32211 | 6 | |
| Curihueque | -37.99849 | 321 | |
| Curilafquén | -38.86402 | 534 | |
| Curilahue | -38.4 | 211 | |
| Curilebu | -38.79083 | 7 | |
| Curilebu | -38.28987 | 77 | |
| Curileufu | -38.66772 | 151 | (Curileo, Estero Curileu, Estero Curileufu) |
| Curimeno | -39.29383 | 559 | |
| Curinilahue | -40.20942 | 83 | (Curinilahue, Rio Curinilehue, Curinilahue, Río Curinilehue) |
| Curinumo | -39.1072 | 849 | |
| Curipel | -38.97808 | 40 | |
| Curipel | -35.1335 | 71 | |
| Curipeumo | -35.91576 | 118 | |
| Currileufu | -40.47307 | 74 | (Curileufu, Rio Currileufu, Curileufu, Río Currileufu) |
| Curringue | -40.215 | 141 | |
| Curte | -22.30435 | 3164 | |
| Cusilelfu | -39.7164 | 150 | |
| Cután | -36.54171 | 81 | (Cutan, Estero Cután, Estero Llequen, Estero Llequén) |
| Cutipay | -39.83306 | 0 | |
| Cuyaimán | -40.46476 | 122 | |
| Cuyel | -38.36956 | 13 | |
| Cuyuldeo | -42.69494 | 4 | |
| Cuyuncaví | -33.40965 | 197 | (Curacavi, Estero Curacaví, Estero Cuyuncavi, Estero de Cuyuncaví) |
| Cuzco | -34.12158 | 124 | |
