= Chin chin =

Nigerian snack

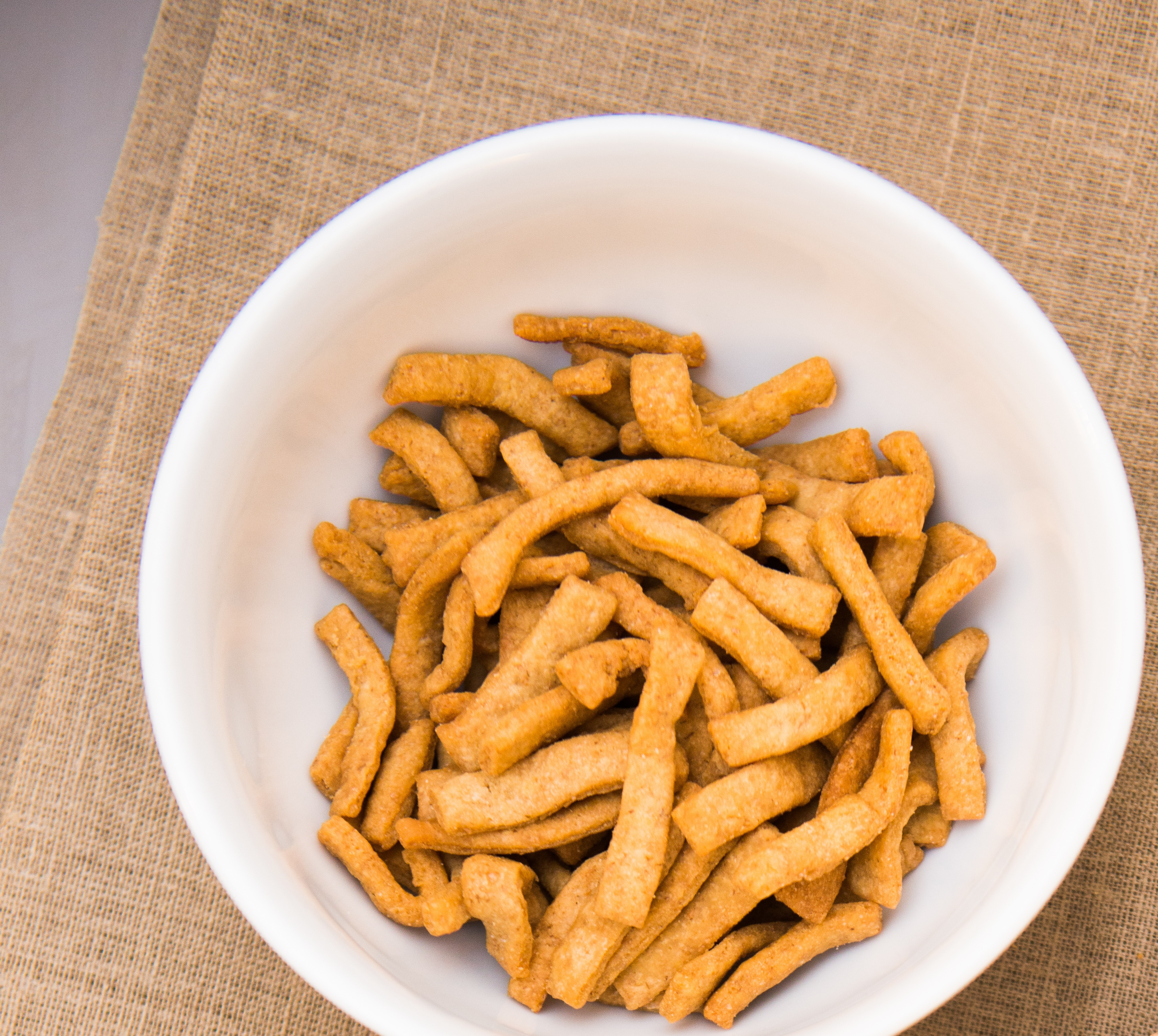
- A bowl of chin chin
- Place of origin: Nigeria

Chin chin is a fried snack from Nigeria. It is known as atchomon in Togo and Benin, achomo in Ghana, and croquette or chin chin in Cameroon.

It is similar to the Scandinavian snack klenat, a crunchy, donut-like baked or fried dough of wheat flour. Chin chin may contain cowpeas. Many people bake it with ground nutmeg for added flavor.

The dough is usually kneaded and cut into small one-inch (or so) squares, about a quarter of an inch thick, before frying.

== Ingredients ==
Chin chin is made of dough containing flour, sugar, butter, and milk. Optional ingredients include eggs, sugar, lemon/lime zest, orange flavoring and baking powder according to individual preference. The dough is cut into various shapes and sizes, then typically deep-fried in vegetable oil.

== Gallery ==
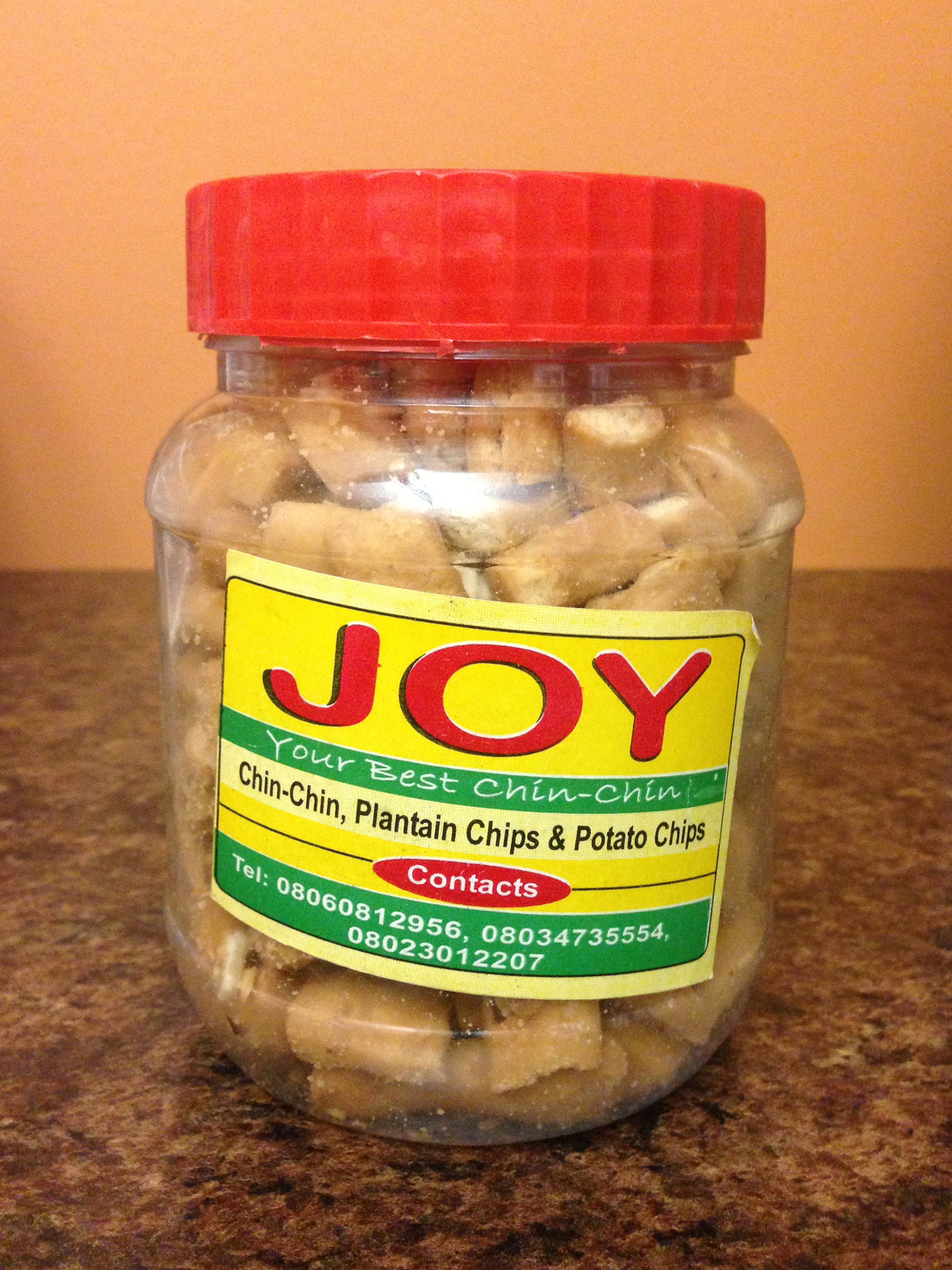
Chin chin

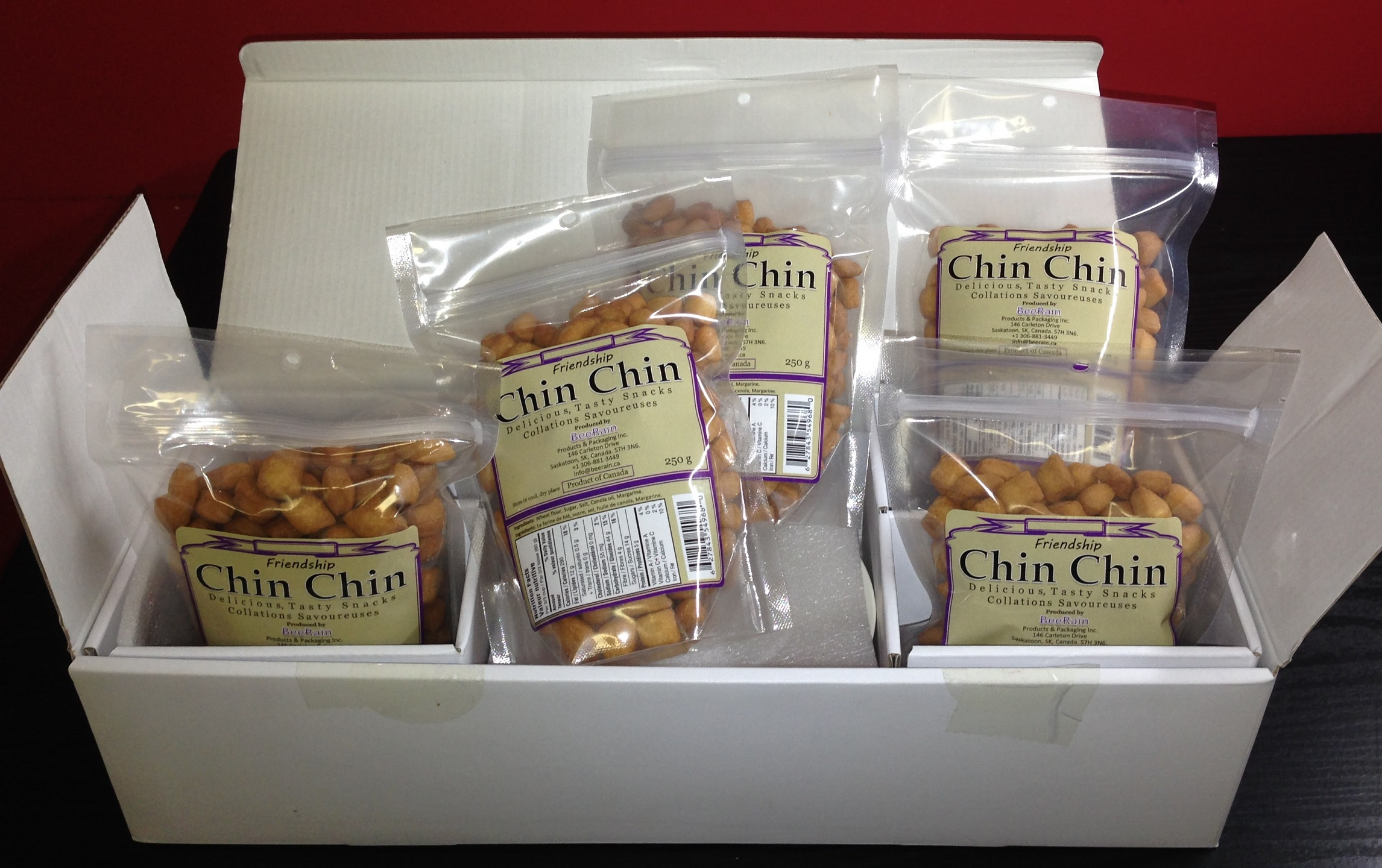
Chin chin in a box

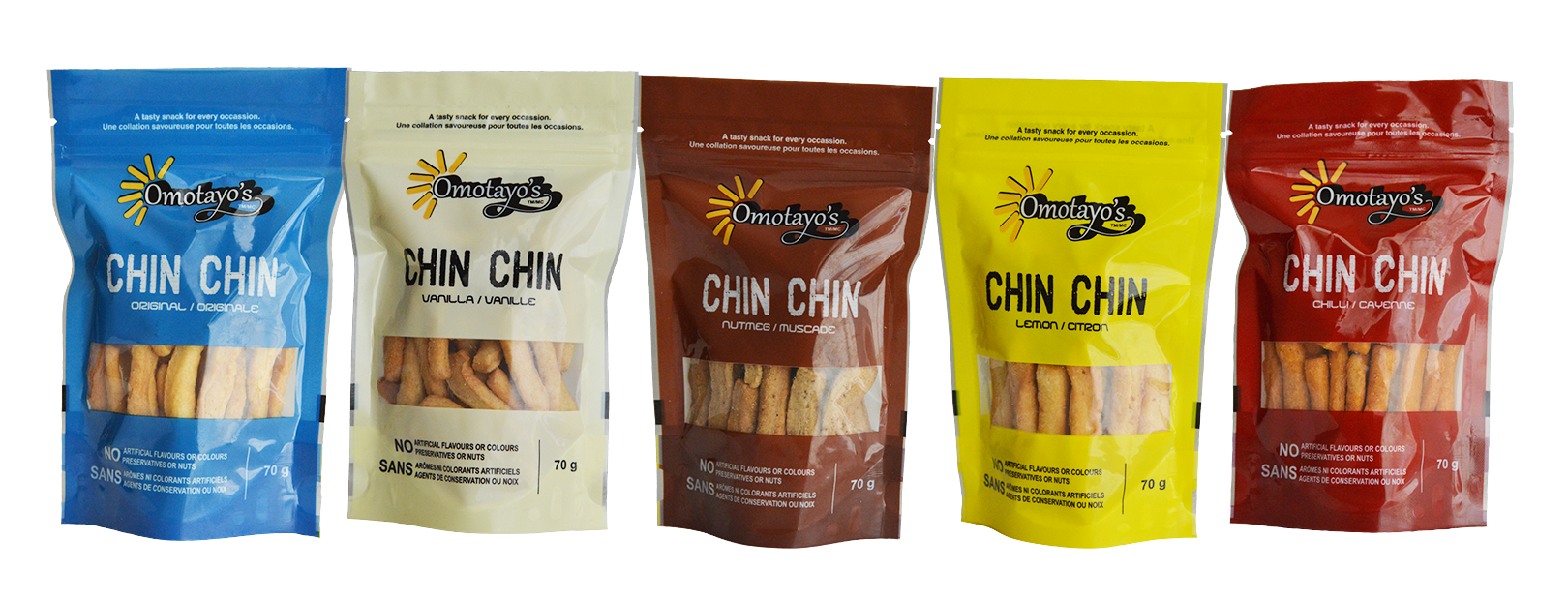
Flavored chin chin

Process of making chin chin
