= Estero Colina =

Coordinates: 33.1917°S 70.6047°W

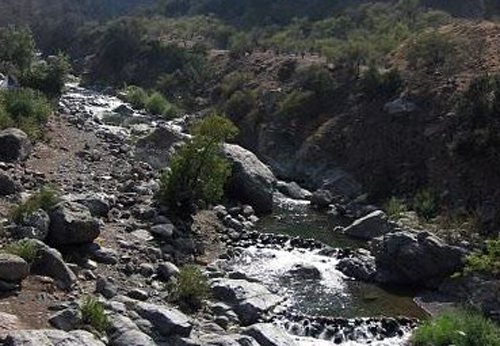
- Río Colina

Location
- Country: Chile

Physical characteristics
- Source
  - location: Santiago Metropolitan Region
- Mouth
  - location: Santiago Metropolitan Region

The Estero Colina is a river of Chile. It is located in the Santiago Metropolitan Region. Estero Colina is a tributary of the Mapocho river.

== See also ==
- List of rivers of Chile
