= Chinchin =

Chinchin Չինչին
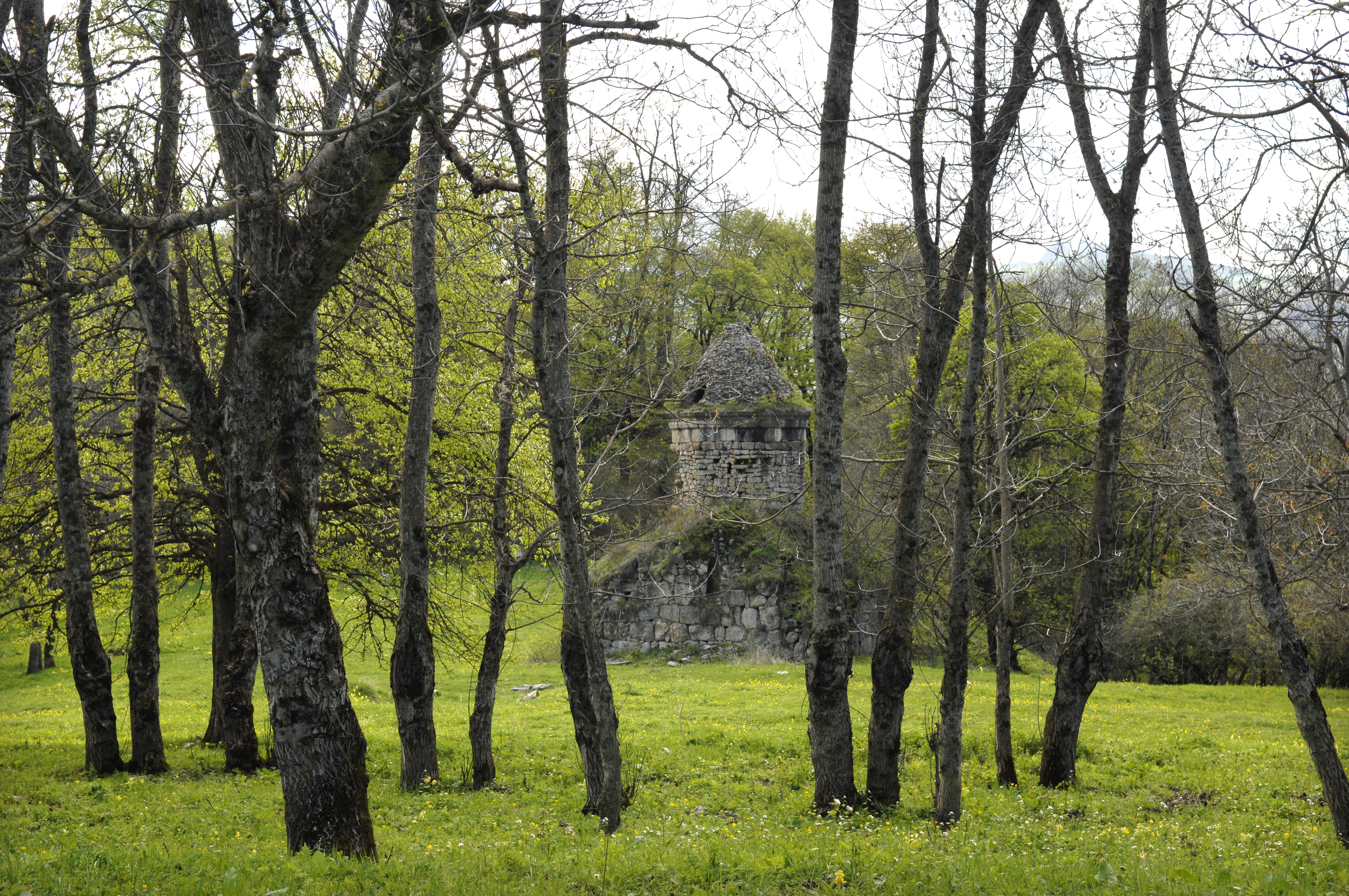
- Nature around Kaptavank Monastery

- Location within Armenia Location within Tavush
- Coordinates: 40°54′42″N 45°21′15″E
- Country: Armenia
- Province: Tavush
- Municipality: Berd
- Elevation: 1,290 m (4,230 ft)

Population (2011)
  - Total: 558
- Time zone: UTC+4 (AMT)

Chinchin (Armenian: Չինչին) is a village in the Berd Municipality of the Tavush Province of Armenia. The 12th-century Kaptavank Monastery (lit. 'Blue monastery') is located near the village.

== Gallery ==
Kaptavank Monastery near Chinchin

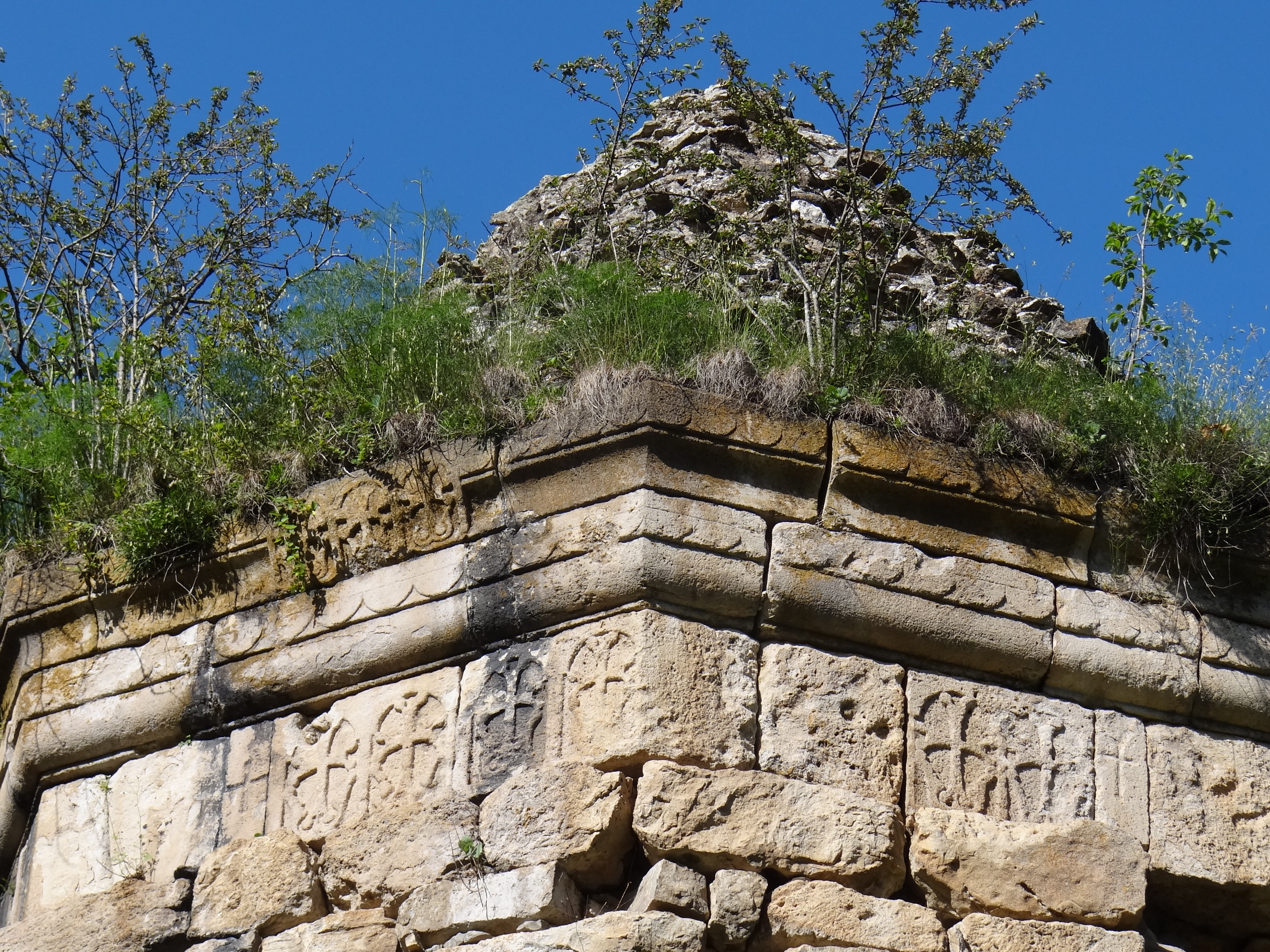

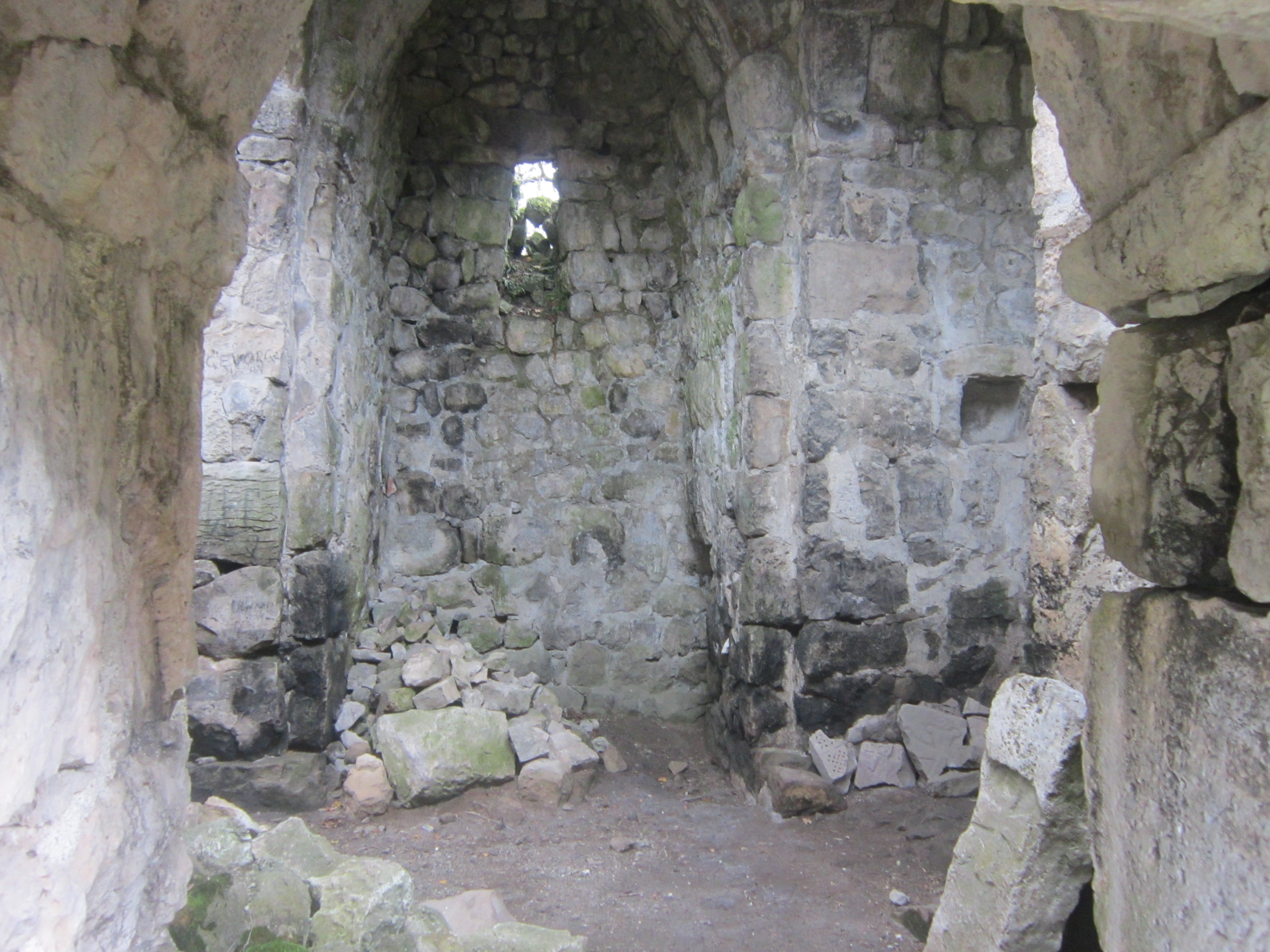

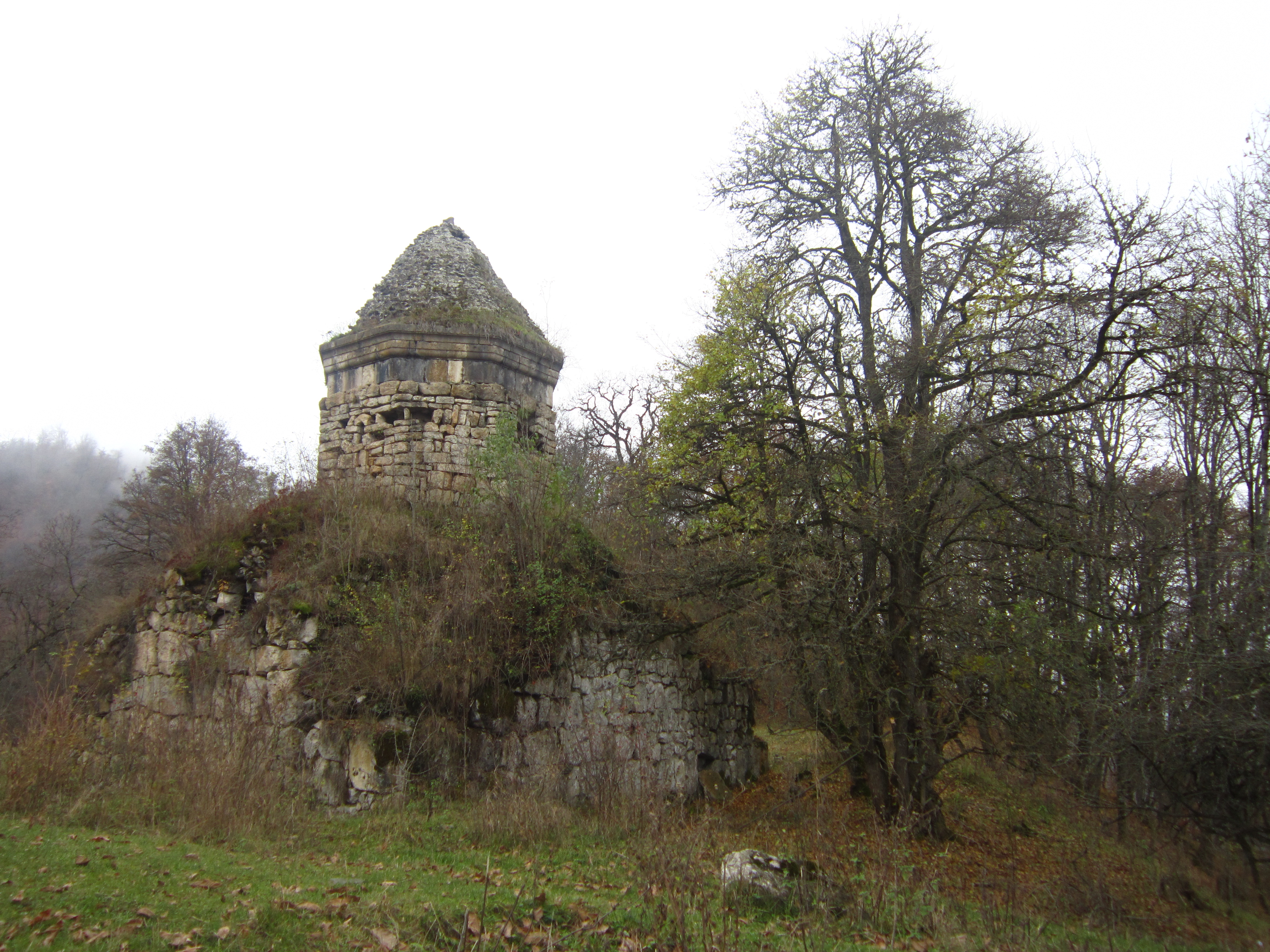

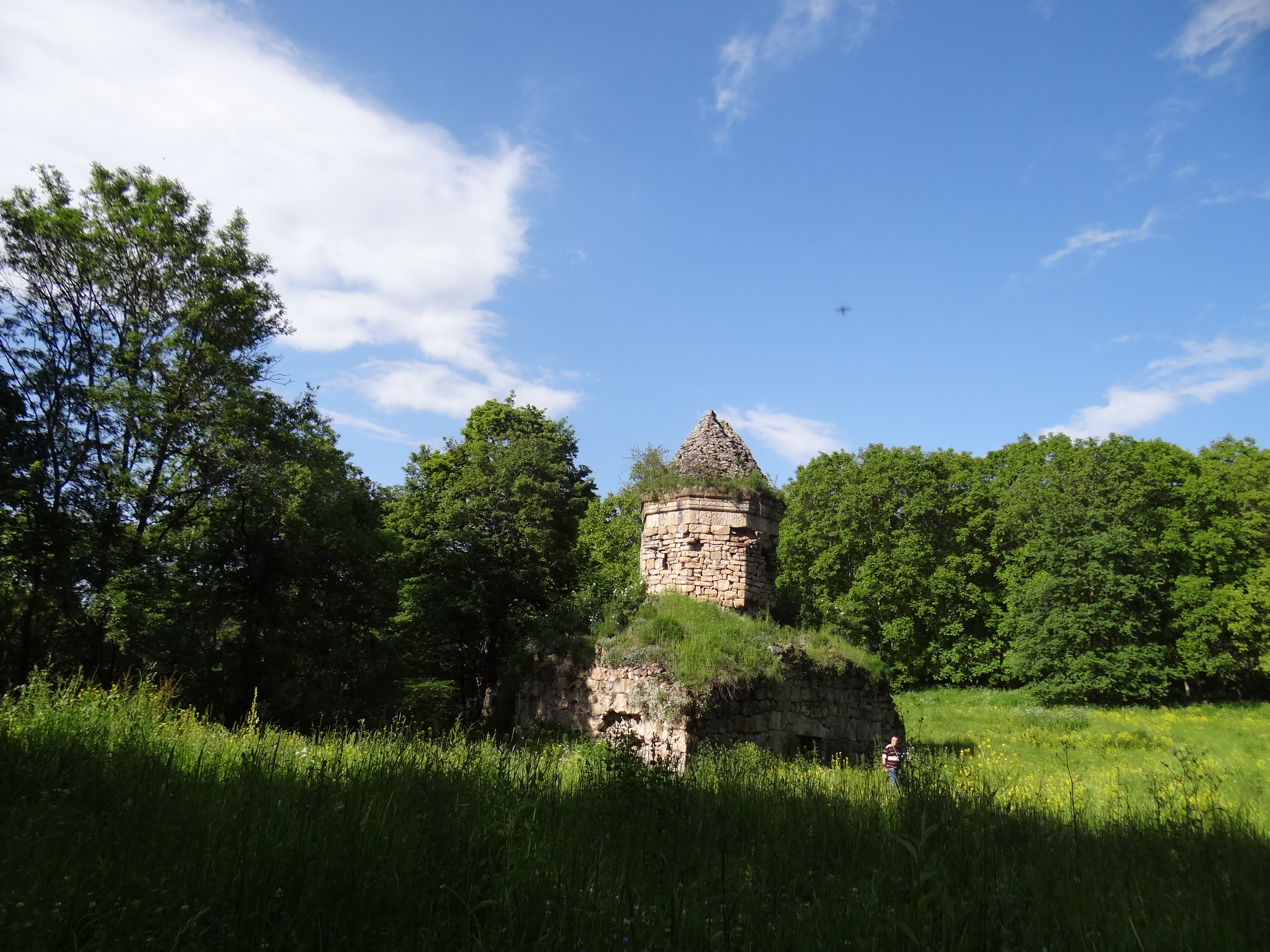
