= Theophilus Cibber =

English actor and playwright (1703–1758)

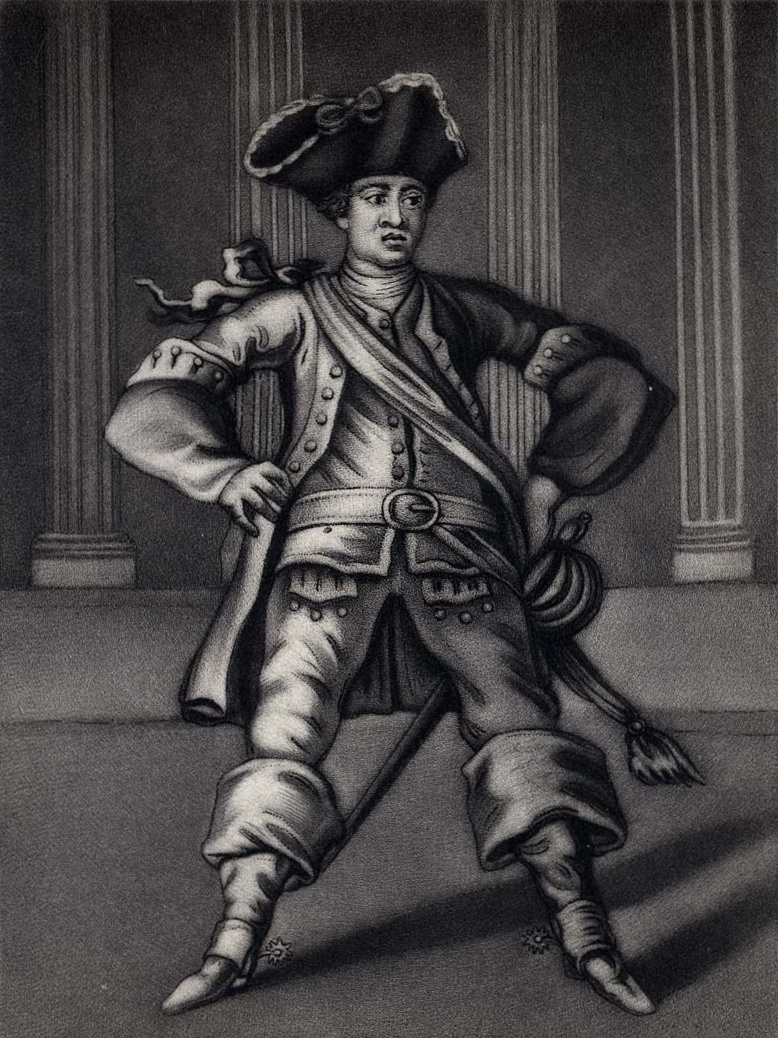
Theophilus Cibber in the role of Ancient Pistol

Theophilus Cibber (25 or 26 November 1703 – October 1758) was an English actor, playwright, writer, and son of the actor-manager Colley Cibber.

He began acting at an early age, and followed his father into theatrical management. In 1727, Alexander Pope satirised Theophilus Cibber in his Dunciad as a youth who "thrusts his person full into your face" (III 132). On the stage, he was famous for playing Pistol in Henry IV, Part 2, and some of the comic roles his father had played when younger, but unsympathetic critics accused him of overemphasis. His private life later led Theophilus into bad reputation and scandal. In October of 1758, Theophilus set sail for Dublin at the behest of Thomas Sheridan, owner of the Theatre Royal. However, his ship was driven off course and Theophilus perished when it was wrecked off the coast of Scotland.

== Early life and career ==
Theophilus Cibber was born during the Great storm of 1703 and began acting in the Drury Lane Theatre at the age of 16 in 1721. As a young man, Cibber was a notorious rake, and associated with young men of a similar mind and reputation, such as the Duke of Wharton.

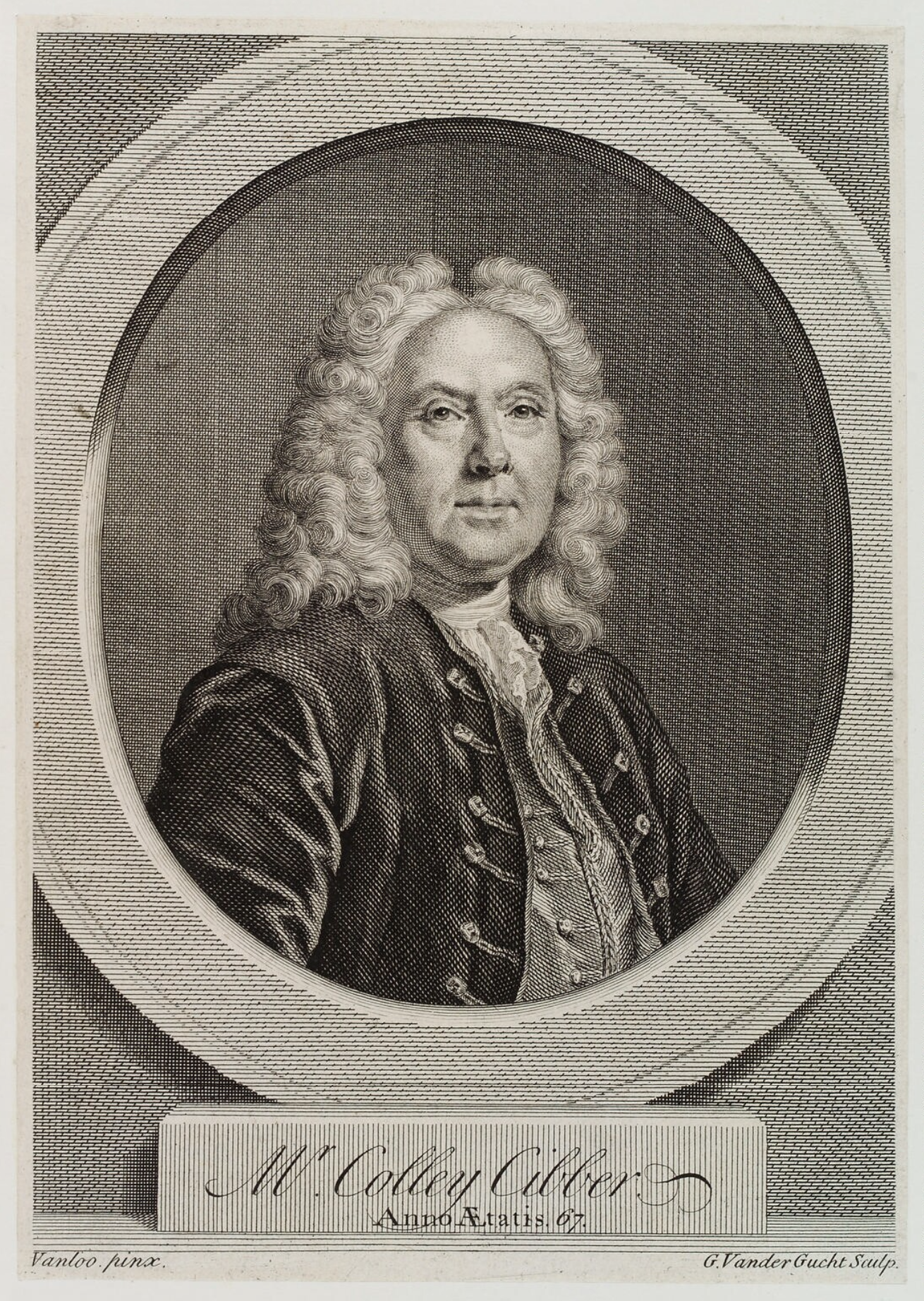
Colley Cibber, Theophilus's father Engraving by Gerard Van der Gucht, after Jean Baptiste van Loo

As the son of Catherine and Colley Cibber, one of the theatre's managers, Theophilus became involved in the management of Drury Lane. In 1723, he became manager of the summer season, and in 1727 became assistant manager during the regular season. In 1732, one of the managers, Barton Booth, sold his share to John Highmore, and another of the managers, Robert Wilks, fell ill and died. Cibber senior became disenchanted by the involvement of Wilks's widow, through her representative John Ellys, in the management of the company. He dropped out of the management and leased his share in the company to his son. Cibber junior took the lead in the management of the theatre during the 1732–33 season, until he fell ill. The actions of Ellys and Highmore in his absence, which appear to have been largely centred on saving or making money, irritated Theophilus and friction grew between them. The other managers approached Cibber senior and offered to buy out his share. Without consulting Theophilus, Colley Cibber sold them his share for 3,000 guineas, and they promptly gave Theophilus his notice. Theophilus led the actors in a walkout and they set themselves up as rival, but informal, company of players in the Haymarket. The Cibbers applied for a letters patent to perform at the Haymarket, but it was refused, and the Drury Lane managers attempted to shut down Cibber by conspiring in the arrest of his leading actor, John Harper, on a charge of vagrancy. Public opinion swung to Theophilus's side, and Harper was released. The Drury Lane managers were defeated, and Theophilus regained control of the company on his own terms.

Theophilus married actress Jane Johnson and they had four children: Colley George in 1726, Catherine in 1727, Jane in 1729, and Elizabeth in 1732. Colley George and Catherine died in infancy, and their mother died at the age of 26 just after the birth of Elizabeth from puerperal fever. Jane and Elizabeth were raised in the house of their grandfather, Colley Cibber.

In 1730, Theophilus adapted Allan Ramsay's Scots pastoral comedy The Gentle Shepherd as Patie & Peggy; or, The Fair Foundling, a one act afterpiece for the London stage. It was performed six times at the Theatre Royal, Drury Lane during the 1730-31 season, with Theophilus playing the part of Roger, and once at Goldman's Fields Theatre in 1735.

In the period 1739–42 Theophilus was associated with a para-masonic group of male and female theatre folk calling itself the Modern Masons that met at Silvester's Gardens in Clerkenwell. This was one of several groups unsympathetic to the Ministry of Prime Minister Robert Walpole that created propaganda in support of the anti-Walpole Patriot Opposition, a.k.a. the Patriot Party.

== Adultery case scandal ==
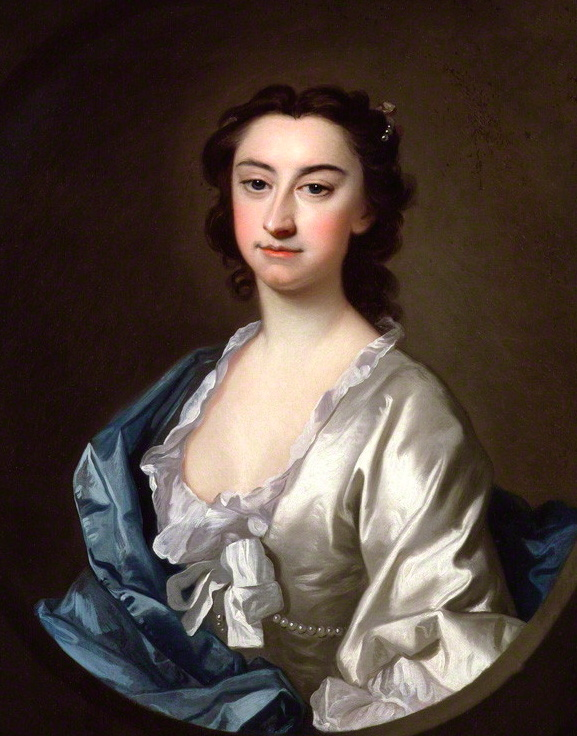
Susannah Maria Cibber, Theophilus's second wife Portrait by Thomas Hudson, 1749

Two years after the death of his first wife, Jane, Cibber married the singer and actress Susannah Maria Arne, the sister of musician Thomas Arne on 21 April 1734. Unusually, Susannah Maria insisted on a prenuptial agreement that protected her own property and income by placing it in the hands of two trustees, who released it to her in small amounts. Theophilus had no access to the money, and the agreement stipulated that if she died without children, then the money was to be inherited by her parents rather than her husband. They had two children, Susannah in 1735 and Caius-Gabriel in 1736, but both died aged less than a year.

Both Theophilus and Susannah Maria were members of the Drury Lane theatre company managed by Cibber. From 1735, Cibber began drawing his wife's earnings from the theatre personally, ignoring the marriage settlement, and by 1737 he was even selling her clothes and personal effects to make money. In 1738, the couple were involved in a notorious lawsuit which drew public attention to Cibber's connivance in his wife's adultery. The Cibbers had established a ménage à trois with John Sloper, a country squire, from whom Theophilus accepted money. The three of them set up house together in Kensington, for which Sloper paid the rent and maintenance, until Cibber slipped away to France to escape his creditors. To his dismay, Susannah Maria wrote him a letter to say that she was leaving him for Sloper.

Cibber returned to England, and began negotiating a settlement with Susannah Maria and Sloper, punctuated by an absurd but successful attempt to abduct Susannah Maria from Sloper's country house that ended with all three of them staying at the same inn, despite Sloper firing a pistol over Cibber's head. Theophilus confined his wife to a house in Wild Court, Great Wild Street, from where she was rescued by her brother Thomas who broke in and knocked out the guard. Theophilus had Thomas imprisoned in Bridewell temporarily, and Susannah Maria returned to Sloper. Becoming greedy, Cibber sued Sloper for £5,000 damages for criminal conversation, which he described as threatening "his peace of mind, his happiness, and his hopes of posterity". The prosecution produced witnesses, lodging house keepers Mr and Mrs Hayes, who admitted to spying on Sloper and Mrs Cibber through a wainscot partition, thus establishing adultery beyond doubt. Sloper's defence counsel rebutted by calling the Kensington housekeeper, Anne Hopson, who testified that Cibber received money from Sloper with full knowledge of his wife's affair. The defence said of Cibber: "He takes his money, lets him maintain his family, resigns his wife to him, and then comes to court for justice, for reparation in damages." Counsel concluded that "there is no denomination in coin small enough to give in damages." The jury concurred, and awarded Cibber a nominal £10.

== Decline ==
Sloper retired to the country, and Susannah gave up performing for a while. When Cibber appeared as Lord Foppington in The Relapse at Drury Lane, he was pelted with fruit and garbage. The following year, 1739, Cibber brought an action against Sloper for £10,000 for "detaining" his wife. This time he was awarded £500. Susannah went to Ireland and a concert season with Handel while the scandal died down, but later returned to have a successful career at Drury Lane, working with David Garrick and becoming famous as a tragic actress. Cibber lost his influence in the theatre and spent his remaining years switching from venue to venue, taking the occasional part. His exaggerated acting style was out of fashion and unpopular, and he drank to excess.

His father died on 11 December 1757, leaving Theophilus just £50 in his will, and the following day Theophilus wrote to the Lord Chamberlain, the Duke of Newcastle, asking for work in a theatre. Theophilus's eulogy to his father, delivered on stage dressed in mourning, was not a success, and he was forced to look for work elsewhere. Thomas Sheridan offered him work at the Smock Alley Theatre (known as the Theatre Royal) in Dublin. On the trip to Ireland, his ship, the Dublin Trader with about 60 passengers on board, foundered in a storm, and was wrecked on the Scottish coast. He was lost at sea.

== Authorship ==
At the age of 17, Cibber adapted Shakespeare's Henry VI, An Historical Tragedy of the Civil Wars in Reign of King Henry VI. Later, he adapted Romeo and Juliet, in which he played Romeo opposite his 14-year-old daughter, Jenny, as Juliet. Theophilus's plays, which include the ballad opera Patie and Peggie, the comedy The Lover, the farce The Auction and the pantomime The Harlot's Progress, are of no great merit. They were published in a modern edition by David Mann in 1981.

Theophilus's authorship of Lives of the Poets of Great Britain and Ireland, to the Time of Dean Swift (1753) is disputed; Samuel Johnson claimed that it was written by Robert Shiels. Most of the text is lifted from earlier works by Gerard Langbaine and Giles Jacob. Other works in Theophilus's name are A Letter from Theophilus Cibber to John Highmore (1733), A Lick at a Liar: or Calumny Detected. Being an Occasional Letter to a Friend (1752), An Epistle from Mr Theophilus Cibber to David Garrick, esq. (1755), and Two Dissertations on the Theatres (1756), which despite the title was in three parts.

In April 1740, Theophilus's father published an autobiography, An Apology for the Life of Colley Cibber, which was a commercial success. Shortly after its release, Theophilus drew up a proposal for his own autobiography and began to collect advances from prospective subscribers. In July, An Apology for the Life of Mr. T[heophilus] C[ibber], Comedian: Being a Proper Sequel to The Apology for the Life of Mr. Colley Cibber, Comedian, with an Historical View of the Stage to the Present Year / Supposed to be Written by Himself in the Style and Manner of the Poet Laureate, was published but Theophilus was not the author. It was an anonymous attack against the Cibbers patterned on Colley Cibber's succès de scandale autobiography. Theophilus claimed he returned the subscriptions and threatened the publishers with a lawsuit, but nothing came of his threats. The author was never discovered, but Henry Fielding was suspected. Fielding's 20th-century biographer Wilbur Lucius Cross thought that Fielding "did not actually write the book, [but] was doubtless in the secret, and may have lent his aid here and there".

== Selected roles ==
- Daniel in The Conscious Lovers by Richard Steele (1722)
- Earl of Somerset in Sir Thomas Overbury by Richard Savage (1723)
- Toywell in A Wife to be Lett by Eliza Haywood (1723)
- Le Beau in Love in a Forest by Charles Johnson (1723)
- Pert in The Impertinent Lovers by Francis Hawling (1723)
- Ptolemy in Caesar in Egypt by Colley Cibber (1724)
- Lord Toupet in The Rival Modes by James Moore Smythe (1727)
- Roger in Patie & Peggy; or, The Fair Foundling (1730)
- Bays in Bayes's Opera by Gabriel Odingsells (1730)
- Philander in The Triumphs of Love and Honour by Thomas Cooke (1731)
- George Barnwell in The London Merchant by George Lillo (1731)
- Gaffer Dunfork in The Devil to Pay by Charles Coffey (1732)
- Captain Bellamant in The Modern Husband by Henry Fielding (1732)
- Jack Stocks in The Lottery by Henry Fielding (1732)
- Squire Chip in The Modish Couple by James Miller (1732)
- Ramilie in The Miser by Henry Fielding (1733)
- Looby Headpiece in The Mother-in-Law by James Miller (1734)
- Messala in Junius Brutus by William Duncombe (1734)
- Amasie in The Christian Hero by George Lillo (1735)
- Martin in The Man of Taste by James Miller (1735)
- Captain Spark in The Universal Gallant by Henry Fielding (1735)
- Nerestan in Zara by Aaron Hill (1736)
- Joculo in The Universal Passion by James Miller (1737)
- Julio in Art and Nature by James Miller (1738)
- Cibber, a Comedian in The Coffee House by James Miller (1738)
- Melisander in Agamemnon by James Thomson (1738)
