= John Harper (actor) =

English actor

John Harper (died 1742) was an English actor. He was known for comic parts.

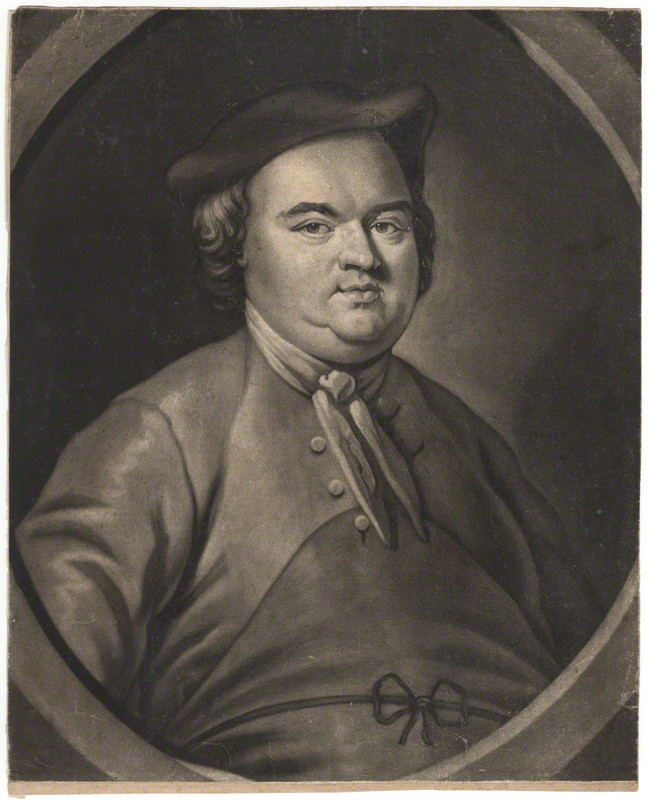
John Harper, 1739 engraving by Andrew Miller. He is in character as Jobson, the Cobbler in The Devil to Pay, or the Wives Metamorphosed by Charles Coffey, in which he supported Kitty Clive as Nell.

== Life ==
Harper originally performed at Bartholomew Fair and Southwark Fair; a performance for his benefit at William Bullock's booth in Birdcage Alley, consisting of The Jew of Venice, songs and dances, and the drunken man by Harper, was announced in The Daily Courant of 24 September 1719.

On 7 November 1719 at Lincoln's Inn Fields Harper was the original Montmorency in Charles Beckingham's Henry IV of France. He remained at Lincoln's Inn Fields until 1721. On 27 October 1721 his name appears as Sir Epicure Mammon in The Alchemist at Drury Lane. Here he remained for eleven years, taking parts for a low comedian. For some years he was the Falstaff of Drury Lane, and was more popular in the part than his rival James Quin. He also played the king in King Henry VIII, and in Virtue Betrayed by John Banks.

Harper was one of the participants in the Actor Rebellion of 1733 and seceded from Drury Lane. John Highmore, the theatre's patentee, made him the target of a test legal action under the Vagrant Act, 12 Queen Anne; and on 12 November 1733 Harper was committed to Bridewell, as a vagabond. On 20 November he came before Lord Hardwicke, Chief Justice of the King's Bench. It was pleaded on his behalf that he paid his debts, was well esteemed by persons of condition, was a freeholder in Surrey, and a householder in Westminster. He was discharged amid acclamations on his own recognisance.

On 21 October 1738 Harper's name appeared in the Drury Lane bills in a favourite part, Cacafogo in Rule a Wife and have a Wife. Soon afterwards he had a stroke of paralysis. He died on 1 January 1742.

== Selected roles ==
- Grogram in Kensington Gardens by John Leigh (1719)
- Montmorency in Henry IV of France by Charles Beckingham (1719)
- Loadham in The Half-Pay Officers by Charles Molloy (1720)
- Sir Roland Heartfree in Whig and Tory by Benjamin Griffin (1720)
- Old Hob in Hob's Wedding (1720)
- Tally in The Artifice by Susanna Centlivre (1722)
- Shamble in A Wife to be Lett by Eliza Haywood (1723)
- Blunt in The Impertinent Lovers by Francis Hawling (1723)
- Sir Oliver Bruin in The Rival Modes by James Moore Smythe (1727)
- Sir Positive Trap in Love in Several Masques by Henry Fielding (1728)
- Aegon in Love in a Riddle by Colley Cibber (1729)
- Sir Nicholas Wiseacre in The Village Opera by Charles Johnson (1729)
- Crispin in Bayes's Opera by Gabriel Odingsells (1730)
- Hobson in The Devil to Pay by Charles Coffey (1732)
- Sir Lubbardly Block in The Modish Couple by James Miller (1732)
- Constable in Caelia by Charles Johnson (1732)
- Ticket Renter in The Lottery by Henry Fielding (1732)
- Woodall in The Modern Husband by Henry Fielding (1732)
- Galleypot in The Mother-in-Law by James Miller (1734)
- Colonel Raffler in The Universal Gallant by Henry Fielding (1735)
- Sir Humphrey Henpeck in The Man of Taste by James Miller (1735)
- Porco in The Universal Passion by James Miller (1737)
- Booswell in The Coffee House by James Miller (1738)

== Notes ==
Attribution

This article incorporates text from a publication now in the public domain: Stephen, Leslie; Lee, Sidney, eds. (1890). "Harper, John (d.1742)". Dictionary of National Biography. Vol. 24. London: Smith, Elder & Co.
