= Mary Heron (actress) =

British stage actress

Mary Heron (died 1736) was a British stage actress.

After making her London debut in a revival The Man of Mode in 1721 she became a regular member of the Drury Lane company until 1734. Although she also did serious parts, she grew to being one of the leading comedy performers of the company. She took part in the Actor Rebellion of 1733 against the management of the theatre.

== Selected roles ==
- Emilia in The Man of Mode by George Etherege (1721)
- Valeria in The Rover by Aphra Behn (1722)
- Farcia in Bayes's Opera by Gabriel Odingsells (1730)
- Lady Modely in The Modish Couple by James Miller (1732)
- Primrose in The Mother-in-Law by James Miller (1734)
- Lucia in Junius Brutus by William Duncombe (1734)
- Mrs Raffler in The Universal Gallant by Henry Fielding (1735)

== Bibliography ==
- Highfill, Philip H, Burnim, Kalman A. & Langhans, Edward A. A Biographical Dictionary of Actors, Actresses, Musicians, Dancers, Managers, and Other Stage Personnel in London, 1660-1800: Garrick to Gyngell. SIU Press, 1978.
