= William Mills (actor) =

British stage actor (1701–1750)

William Mills (1701–1750) was a British stage actor.

The son of veteran stage actor John Mills and his wife Margaret Mills, he was born in London and baptised at St Martin-in-the-Fields on 29 June 1701. Under his father's guidance he made his debut as a child actor in 1712.

Like his father, he was a long-standing member of the Drury Lane theatre company. He took part in the Actor Rebellion of 1733, and left to work at the Haymarket Theatre for a season before returning to Drury Lane. His last appearance was in The Merchant of Venice in February 1750 and he died two months later on 18 April, shortly before a benefit was to be staged for him, and was buried at St Martin-in-the-Fields.

He was married to the actress Theodosia Mills until her death in 1733, after which he married another actress Elizabeth Holliday. With his first wife he had a daughter also called Theodosia who likewise became an actress.

== Selected roles ==
- Diego in Love in a Veil by Richard Savage (1718)
- Mandrocles in The Spartan Dame by Thomas Southerne (1719)
- Auletes in Busiris, King of Egypt by Edward Young (1719)
- Artamas in The Siege of Damascus by John Hughes (1720)
- Idwall in The Briton by Ambrose Philips (1722)
- Duke of Buckingham in Humphrey, Duke of Gloucester by Ambrose Philips (1723)
- Charles in Love in a Forest by Charles Johnson (1723)
- Aegon in Hecuba by Richard West (1726)
- Aegeus in Medea by Charles Johnson (1730)
- Vice Chancellor in The Humours of Oxford by James Miller (1730)
- Olinphus in Timoleon by Benjamin Martyn (1730)
- Trueman in The London Merchant by George Lillo (1731)
- Aristarchus in The Triumphs of Love and Honour by Thomas Cooke (1731)
- Medon in Eurydice by David Mallet (1731)
- Wronglove in Caelia by Charles Johnson (1732)
- Clerimont in The Miser by Henry Fielding (1733)
- Beaumont in The Mother-in-Law by James Miller (1734)
- Caelius in Junius Brutus by William Duncombe (1734)
- Gaylove in The Universal Gallant by Henry Fielding (1735)
- Harcourt in The Man of Taste by James Miller (1735)
- Mahomet in The Christian Hero by George Lillo (1735)
- Bellario in The Universal Passion by James Miller (1737)
- Truemore in Art and Nature by James Miller (1738)
- Artamon in The Fatal Retirement by Anthony Brown (1739)
- Rustan in Mustapha by David Mallet (1739)
- Andrew II in Elmerick by George Lillo (1740)
- Stargaze in The Astrologer by James Ralph (1744)
- Metullus in Regulus by William Havard (1744)
- Gratiano in The Merchant of Venice by William Shakespeare (1750)

== Bibliography ==
- Highfill, Philip H, Burnim, Kalman A. & Langhans, Edward A. A Biographical Dictionary of Actors, Actresses, Musicians, Dancers, Managers, and Other Stage Personnel in London, 1660-1800: Garrick to Gyngell. SIU Press, 1978.
- Straub, Kristina, G. Anderson, Misty and O'Quinn, Daniel . The Routledge Anthology of Restoration and Eighteenth-Century Drama. Taylor & Francis, 2017.
