= Roger Bridgewater =

British stage actor

Roger Bridgewater (died 1754) was a British stage actor of the eighteenth century. He worked as party of the Drury Lane company for many years, specialising in dramatic roles, before switching to Covent Garden in 1734. In later years he frequently played Falstaff.

== Selected roles ==
- Earl of Northumberland in Sir Thomas Overbury by Richard Savage (1723)
- Captain Gaylove in A Wife to be Lett by Eliza Haywood (1723)
- Orbasius in The Captives by John Gay (1724)
- Ulysses in Hecuba by Richard West (1726)
- Count Basset in The Provoked Husband by Colley Cibber (1728)
- Malvil in Love in Several Masques by Henry Fielding (1728)
- Timophanes in Timoleon by Benjamin Martyn (1730)
- Lord Briton in Bayes's Opera by Gabriel Odingsells (1730)
- Shamwell in The Humours of Oxford by James Miller (1730)
- Laelius in Sophonisba by James Thomson (1730)
- Athelwold in Athelwold by Aaron Hill (1731)
- Thorowgood in The London Merchant by George Lillo (1731)
- Leonidas in Eurydice by David Mallet (1731)
- Lovemore in Caelia by Charles Johnson (1732)
- Modern in The Modern Husband by Henry Fielding (1732)
- Pierrot in Timon in Love by John Kelly (1733)
- Frederick in The Miser by Henry Fielding (1733)
- Squire Trelooby in The Cornish Squire by James Ralph (1734)
- Modern in The Rival Widows by Elizabeth Cooper (1735)
- Trueman in The Prodigal Reform’d by Hildebrand Jacob (1738)
- Sir Jasper Fragile in The Trial of Conjugal Love by Hildebrand Jacob (1738)
- Strictland in The Suspicious Husband by Benjamin Hoadly (1747)

== Bibliography ==
- Highfill, Philip H, Burnim, Kalman A. & Langhans, Edward A. A Biographical Dictionary of Actors, Actresses, Musicians, Dancers, Managers, and Other Stage Personnel in London, 1660–1800: Garrick to Gyngell. SIU Press, 1978.
- Straub, Kristina, G. Anderson, Misty and O'Quinn, Daniel . The Routledge Anthology of Restoration and Eighteenth-Century Drama. Taylor & Francis, 2017.
