= Bayes's Opera =

Play by Gabriel Odingsells

- Original language: English
- Written by: Gabriel Odingsells
- Genre: Comedy

Premiere
- Date: 30 March 1730
- Place: Theatre Royal, Drury Lane

Bayes's Opera is a 1730 ballad opera by the British writer Gabriel Odingsells. It was part of a boom in ballad operas that followed in the wake of the success of John Gay's The Beggar's Opera.

The original Drury Lane cast included Theophilus Cibber as Bays, Edward Berry as Pantomine, Roger Bridgewater as Lord Briton, James Oates as Bassoon, James Rosco as Crowdero, Joe Miller as Harlequin, John Harper as Crispin, Kitty Clive as Dulceda, Frances Cross as Belinda, Elizabeth Butler as Arabella and Mary Heron as Farcia.

== Bibliography ==
- Burling, William J. A Checklist of New Plays and Entertainments on the London Stage, 1700-1737. Fairleigh Dickinson Univ Press, 1992.
- Nicoll, Allardyce. A History of Early Eighteenth Century Drama: 1700-1750. CUP Archive, 1927.
