= The Man of Taste =

1735 British play

- Original language: English
- Written by: James Miller
- Genre: Comedy

Premiere
- Date: 6 March 1735
- Place: Theatre Royal, Drury Lane

The Man of Taste is a 1735 comedy play by the British writer James Miller. It was a success and was performed numerous times during the theatre season. It is also known by the longer title The Man Of Taste or, The Guardians.

The original Drury Lane cast included Benjamin Griffin as Sir Positive Bubble, John Mills as Freelove, William Milward as Valentine, John Harper as Sir Humphrey Henpeck, William Mills as Harcourt, Theophilus Cibber as Martin, Richard Cross as Lewis, Joe Miller as Renard, Richard Arne as Almanzor, Frances Cross as Lady Henpeck, Kitty Clive as Maria and Hannah Pritchard as Dorothea and Sarah Thurmond as Dorinda.

== Bibliography ==
- Burling, William J. A Checklist of New Plays and Entertainments on the London Stage, 1700-1737. Fairleigh Dickinson Univ Press, 1992.
- Gilman, Todd. The Theatre Career of Thomas Arne. University of Delaware, 2012.
- Nicoll, Allardyce. A History of Early Eighteenth Century Drama: 1700-1750. CUP Archive, 1927.
