= The Triumphs of Love and Honour =

1731 play

- Original language: English
- Written by: Thomas Cooke
- Genre: Tragedy

Premiere
- Date: 18 August 1731
- Place: Theatre Royal, Drury Lane, London

The Triumphs of Love and Honour is a 1731 tragedy by the British writer Thomas Cooke.

The original Drury Lane cast included William Mills as Aristarchus, Theophilus Cibber as Philander, Kitty Clive as Urania and Charlotte Charke as Thalia.

== Bibliography ==
- Baines, Paul & Ferarro, Julian & Rogers, Pat. The Wiley-Blackwell Encyclopedia of Eighteenth-Century Writers and Writing, 1660-1789. Wiley-Blackwell, 2011.
- Burling, William J. A Checklist of New Plays and Entertainments on the London Stage, 1700-1737. Fairleigh Dickinson Univ Press, 1992.
