= Jane Cibber =

British actress (1704/1706–1733)

Jane Cibber (née Johnson; 1704/1706 — 1733) was a British stage actress.

== Life ==
She was born in 1704 or 1706 as Jane Johnson.

Her guardian was the writer Richard Savage. Originally appearing at Drury Lane Theatre as Jane Johnson, in 1725 she married Theophilus Cibber the son of actor-manager Colley Cibber. She had four children with him while continuing to act on the stage in a mixture of comedies and tragedies. When Elizabeth Younger defected to work for the Lincoln's Inn Fields Theatre company, she took over the roles she had been playing. In 1731, she played the title role in Caelia by Charles Johnson.

She died after childbirth in 1733. Her husband said he would never remarry. He did in 1734.

== Selected roles ==
- Polyxena in Hecuba by Richard West (1726)
- Jenny in The Provoked Husband (1728)
- Ianthe in Love in a Riddle (1729)
- Cleone in Timoleon by Benjamin Martyn (1730)
- Maria in The London Merchant (1731)
- Caelia in Caelia (1732)
- Clarissa in The Modish Couple (1732)
- Lady Charlotte Gaywit in The Modern Husband by Henry Fielding (1732)

== Bibliography ==
- Highfill, Philip H, Burnim, Kalman A. & Langhans, Edward A. A Biographical Dictionary of Actors, Actresses, Musicians, Dancers, Managers, and Other Stage Personnel in London, 1660-1800: Garrick to Gyngell. SIU Press, 1978.
- Koon, Helene. Colley Cibber: A Biography. University Press of Kentucky, 2014.
- Straub, Kristina, G. Anderson, Misty and O'Quinn, Daniel . The Routledge Anthology of Restoration and Eighteenth-Century Drama. Taylor & Francis, 2017.
