= James Oates =

British stage actor

James Oates (died 1751) was a British stage actor.

Possibly of Irish birth, he was a long-standing member of the Drury Lane company from 1718, and also appeared at the summer fairs in London including Southwark and Bartholomew Fair. He specialised in supporting roles, often in comedies. He was with Drury Lane for twenty one seasons, and later also became a tavern-owner alongside his acting duties. Like several actors of the era he was a freemason. His wife and daughter were both actresses.

== Selected roles ==
- Jeremy in The Play is the Plot by John Durant Breval (1718)
- Thracion in The Spartan Dame by Thomas Southerne (1719)
- Courtly in A Wife to be Lett by Eliza Haywood (1723)
- Citizen in Double Falsehood by Lewis Theobald (1727)
- File in The Village Opera by Charles Johnson (writer) (1729)
- Mopsus in Love in a Riddle by Colley Cibber (1729)
- Dash in The Humours of Oxford by James Miller (1730)
- Bassoon in Bayes's Opera by Gabriel Odingsells (1730)
- Doctor in The Devil to Pay by Charles Coffey (1731)
- Keeper of Prison in Caelia by Charles Johnson (1732)
- Decoy in The Miser by Henry Fielding (1733)
- Poet in The Mother-in-Law by James Miller (1734)

== Bibliography ==
- Brean, Hammond (ed.) Double Falsehood. AC & Black, 2010.
- Highfill, Philip H, Burnim, Kalman A. & Langhans, Edward A. A Biographical Dictionary of Actors, Actresses, Musicians, Dancers, Managers, and Other Stage Personnel in London, 1660-1800. Southern Illinois University Press, 1973.
- Peter, Robert. British Freemasonry, 1717-1813 Volume 5: Representations. Routledge, 2016.
