= The Modish Couple =

1732 play

- Original language: English
- Written by: James Miller
- Genre: Comedy

Premiere
- Date: 10 January 1732
- Place: Theatre Royal, Drury Lane

The Modish Couple is a 1732 comedy play by the British writer James Miller, under the pen name Charles Boaden. A virtuous wife reforms her rakish husband.

The original Drury Lane cast included Robert Wilks as Lord Modely, John Mills as Claremont, Colley Cibber as Grinly, John Harper as Sir Lubbardly Block, Theophilus Cibber as Squire Chip, Mary Heron as Lady Modely and Jane Cibber as Clarissa. The epilogue was written by Henry Fielding.

== Bibliography ==
- Battestin, Martin C. A Henry Fielding Companion. Greenwood Publishing Group, 2000.
- Burling, William J. A Checklist of New Plays and Entertainments on the London Stage, 1700-1737. Fairleigh Dickinson Univ Press, 1992.
- Gollapudi, Aparna. Moral Reform in Comedy and Culture, 1696–1747. Ashgate Publishing, 2013.
- Nicoll, Allardyce. A History of Early Eighteenth Century Drama: 1700-1750. CUP Archive, 1927.
