= Caelia (play) =

Play by Charles Johnson

- Original language: English
- Written by: Charles Johnson
- Genre: Comedy

Premiere
- Date: 11 December 1732
- Place: Theatre Royal, Drury Lane

Caelia, or, The Perjur'd Lover is a 1732 comedy play by the British writer Charles Johnson. The play's epilogue was written by Henry Fielding.

The original Drury Lane cast included Jane Cibber as Caelia, John Mills as Meanwell, Thomas Hallam as Bellamy, Roger Bridgewater as Lovemore, William Mills as Wronglove, James Oates as Keeper of Prison, Edward Berry as Gentleman, John Harper as the Constable, Frances Cross as Wag and Charlotte Charke as Mrs Lupine.

== Bibliography ==
- Burling, William J. A Checklist of New Plays and Entertainments on the London Stage, 1700-1737. Fairleigh Dickinson Univ Press, 1992.
- Cleary, Thomas R. Henry Fielding, Political Writer: A Political Writer. Wilfrid Laurier Univ. Press, 1984.
- Koon, Helene. Colley Cibber: A Biography. University Press of Kentucky, 2014.
