= Sir Thomas Overbury (play) =

1723 play

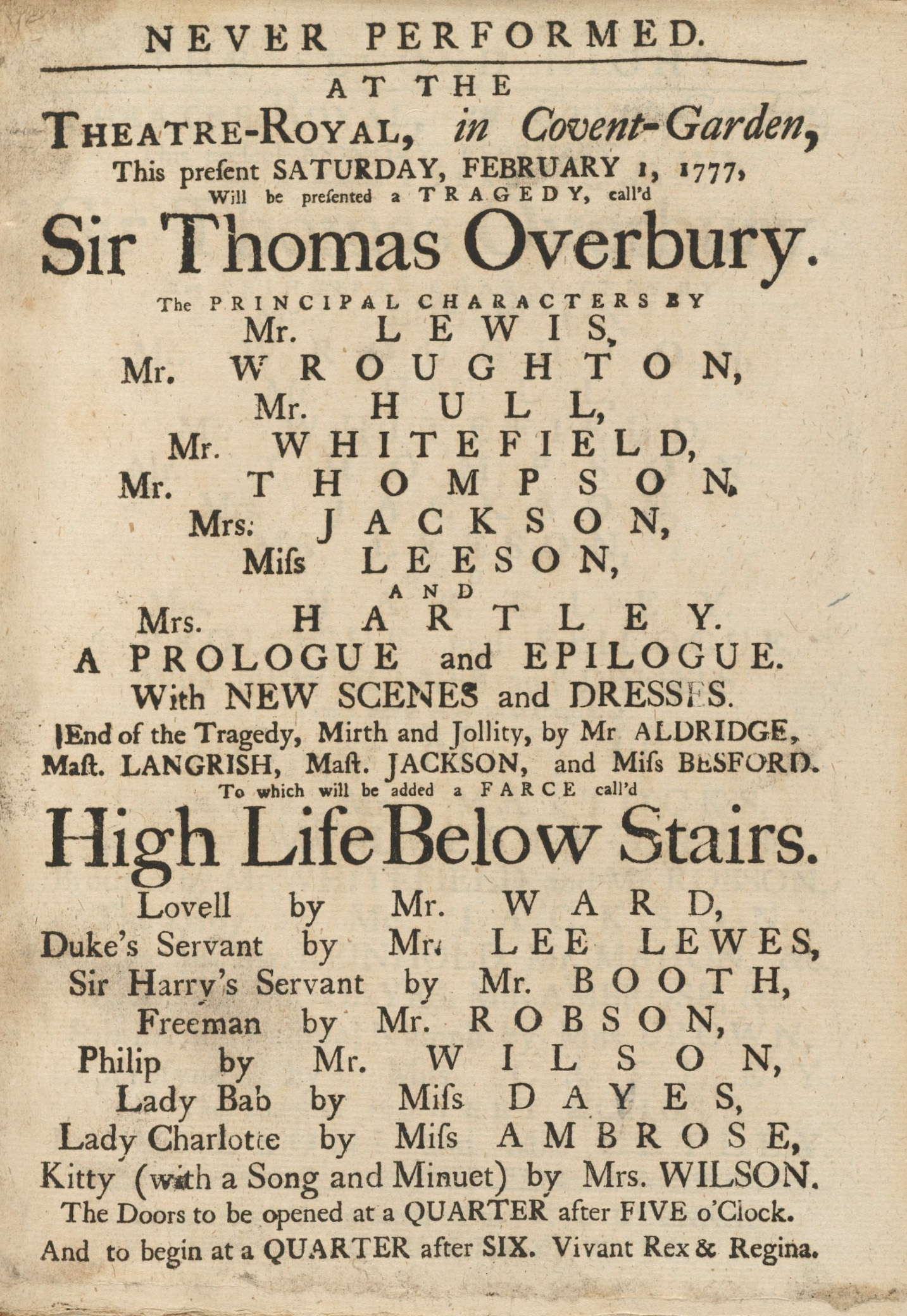
- 1777 playbill
- Written by: Richard Savage
- Original language: English
- Genre: Tragedy

Premiere
- Date premiered: 12 June 1723
- Place premiered: Drury Lane Theatre

Sir Thomas Overbury is a 1723 tragedy by the British writer Richard Savage. It is based on the life of Thomas Overbury an associate of the Jacobean royal favourite Robert Carr whose apparent murder while incarcerated in the Tower of London provoked a trial and major scandal.

Savage played the title role himself when it was staged at the Drury Lane Theatre. Other cast members included Roger Bridgewater as the Earl of Northampton, Theophilus Cibber as the Earl of Somerset and a Mrs. Bret as Isabella. Aaron Hill produced and revised the text of the play. It was published in October 1723. Historian Richard Holmes said the work is "clumsy, sub-Shakespearean, historical melodrama". (Whether any historical play from that period is not "sub-Shakespearean" is, of course, debatable.)

Before his death, Savage completed a new version of Sir Thomas Overbury. In his Life of Mr Richard Savage (1744) Samuel Johnson described this version of the play as preserving only "a few lines" of the original, as having "a total alteration of the plan"—with "new incidents, and introduc[ing] new characters; so that it was a new tragedy". This revised version of Sir Thomas Overbury was first produced and published in 1777.

== Bibliography ==
- Bellany, Alastair. The Politics of Court Scandal in Early Modern England: News Culture and the Overbury Affair, 1603-1660. Cambridge University Press, 2007.
- Burling, William J. A Checklist of New Plays and Entertainments on the London Stage, 1700-1737. Fairleigh Dickinson Univ Press, 1992.
- Erwin, Timothy, "Sir John Hawkins on Richard Savage and the Profession of Authorship" in Reconsidering Biography: Contexts, Controversies, and Sir John Hawkins's Life of Johnson, ed. Martine W. Brownley (Lanham, MA: Bucknell University Press, 2011), 101–114.
- Gerrard, Christine. Aaron Hill: The Muses' Projector, 1685-1750. Oxford University Press, 2003.
