= Timon in Love =

1733 play

- Original language: English
- Written by: John Kelly
- Genre: Comedy

Premiere
- Date: 5 December 1733
- Place: Theatre Royal, Drury Lane

Timon in Love is a 1733 comedy play by John Kelly. It is an adaptation of a French play based on Timon of Athens and is not related to Shakespeare's Timon of Athens.

The original Drury Lane cast included Roger Bridgewater as Pierrot, Kitty Clive as Mercury, Henry Norris as Plutus and Christiana Horton as Eucharis.

== Bibliography ==
- Burling, William J. A Checklist of New Plays and Entertainments on the London Stage, 1700-1737. Fairleigh Dickinson Univ Press, 1992.
- Nicoll, Allardyce. A History of Early Eighteenth Century Drama: 1700-1750. CUP Archive, 1927.
