= The Coffee House (play) =

Play by James Miller

- Original language: English
- Written by: James Miller
- Genre: Comedy

Premiere
- Date: 26 January 1738
- Place: Theatre Royal, Drury Lane

The Coffee House is a 1738 comedy play by the British writer James Miller, written as an afterpiece. After being performed at Drury Lane, it was published later that year with some alterations to the play's original text.

The original Drury Lane cast included Benjamin Griffin as Harpie, Charles Macklin as Bays, John Harper as Booswell, William Havard as Hartly, Richard Winstone as Gaylove, Theophilus Cibber as Cibber, a Comedian and Kitty Clive as Miss Kitty. The role of the poet played by Macklin was apparently intended as a caricature of Richard Savage.

== Bibliography ==
- Baines, Paul & Ferarro, Julian & Rogers, Pat. The Wiley-Blackwell Encyclopedia of Eighteenth-Century Writers and Writing, 1660-1789. Wiley-Blackwell, 2011.
- Nicoll, Allardyce. History of English Drama, 1660-1900, Volume 2. Cambridge University Press, 2009.
- Swindells, Julia & Taylor, David Francis. The Oxford Handbook of the Georgian Theatre 1737-1832. OUP, 2014.
