= A Wife to be Let =

1723 play

A Wife to be Lett
- Written by: Eliza Haywood
- Original language: English
- Genre: Comedy

Premiere
- Date premiered: 12 August 1723
- Place premiered: Theatre Royal, Drury Lane

A Wife to be Lett is a 1723 comedy play by the British writer Eliza Haywood. Better known for her novels, it was Haywood's first theatrical play.

Staged at the Drury Lane Theatre the cast included Theophilus Cibber as Toywell, William Wilks as Sir Harry Beaumont, Roger Bridgewater as Captain Gaylove, James Oates as Courtly and John Harper as Shamble. Haywood herself played the part of the wife Mrs. Graspall, due to an illness of the original actress.

== Bibliography ==
- Burling, William J. A Checklist of New Plays and Entertainments on the London Stage, 1700-1737. Fairleigh Dickinson Univ Press, 1992.
- Nicoll, Allardyce. History of English Drama, 1660-1900, Volume 2. Cambridge University Press, 2009.
