= Junius Brutus (play) =

1734 play

- Original language: English
- Written by: William Duncombe
- Genre: Tragedy

Premiere
- Date: 25 November 1734
- Place: Theatre Royal, Drury Lane

Junius Brutus is a 1734 tragedy by the British writer William Duncombe. It was one of a number of plays based on the life of the Roman Republican Lucius Junius Brutus.

The original Drury Lane cast included John Mills as Junius Brutus, Edward Berry as Valeius Publicola, William Milward as Titus, William Mills as Caelius, Theophilus Cibber as Messala, Richard Winstone as Silvus and Mary Heron as Lucia and Hannah Pritchard as Hortensia.

== Bibliography ==
- Burling, William J. A Checklist of New Plays and Entertainments on the London Stage, 1700-1737. Fairleigh Dickinson Univ Press, 1992.
- Ellison, Julie. Cato's Tears and the Making of Anglo-American Emotion. University of Chicago Press, 1999.
