= Hecuba (West play) =

1726 play

- Written by: Richard West
- Original language: English
- Genre: Tragedy

Premiere
- Date premiered: 2 February 1726
- Place premiered: Theatre Royal, Drury Lane

Hecuba is a 1726 tragedy by the British writer Richard West. It is named after Hecuba, a figure in Greek Mythology from the time of the Trojan War.

The original Drury Lane cast included Mary Porter as Hecuba, Barton Booth as Polymnestor, John Mills as Agamemnon, Roger Bridgewater as Ulysses, John Roberts as Talythibius, William Mills as Aegon, John Thurmond as Maelaines, Jane Cibber as Polyxena and Anne Brett as Iphis.

== Bibliography ==
- Burling, William J. A Checklist of New Plays and Entertainments on the London Stage, 1700-1737. Fairleigh Dickinson Univ Press, 1992.
- Nicoll, Allardyce. A History of Early Eighteenth Century Drama: 1700-1750. CUP Archive, 1927.
