= The Impertinent Lovers =

1723 play

- Original language: English
- Written by: Francis Hawling
- Genre: Comedy

Premiere
- Date: 16 September 1723
- Place: Theatre Royal, Drury Lane

The Impertinent Lovers: or, A Coquet at her Wit's End is a 1723 comedy play by the British writer Francis Hawling. It was submitted to Sir Richard Steele and three gentlemen as patentees and sold by J. Roberts in Warwick Lane, A. Dodd at the Peacock without Temple Bar, and the booksellers of London and Westminster.

The original Drury Lane cast included Thomas Chapman as Meanwell, William Wilks as Freelove, Theophilus Cibber as Pert, John Harper as Blunt, Elizabeth Willis as Abigail. The play is set in Greenwich.

== Bibliography ==
- Burling, William J. A Checklist of New Plays and Entertainments on the London Stage, 1700-1737. Fairleigh Dickinson Univ Press, 1992.
- Nicoll, Allardyce. History of English Drama, 1660-1900, Volume 2. Cambridge University Press, 2009.
