= Eurydice (Mallet play) =

Play by David Mallet

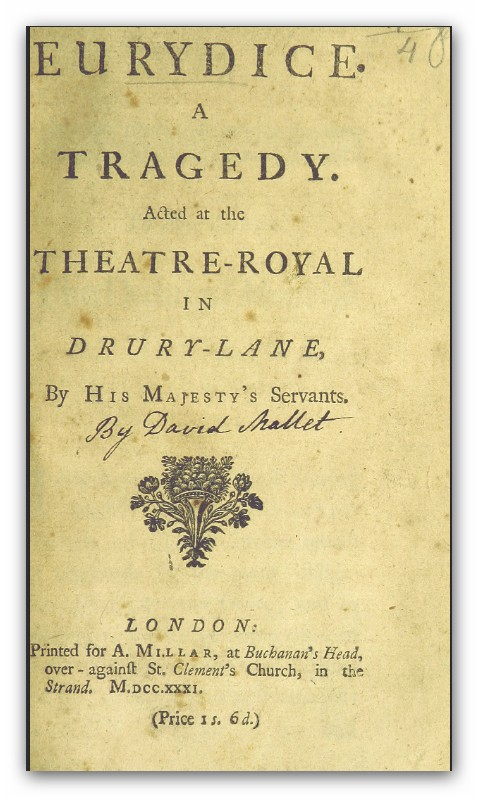
- Original language: English
- Written by: David Mallet
- Genre: Tragedy

Premiere
- Date: 22 February 1731
- Place: Theatre Royal, Drury Lane

Eurydice is a 1731 tragedy by the Scottish writer David Mallet. It is one of a number of plays and operas to be based on the story of Orpheus and Eurydice from Greek Mythology.

The original Drury Lane cast included Mary Porter as Eurydice, Elizabeth Butler as Melissa, Roger Bridgewater as Leonidas, William Mills as Medon, Thomas Hallam as Polydore, John Mills as Periander and John Corey as Ariston. The prologue was written by Aaron Hill and spoken by Robert Wilks.

== Bibliography ==
- Nicoll, Allardyce. A History of Early Eighteenth Century Drama: 1700-1750. CUP Archive, 1927.
