= The Rival Modes =

1727 play

- Original language: English
- Written by: James Moore Smythe
- Genre: Comedy

Premiere
- Date: 27 January 1727
- Place: Theatre Royal, Drury Lane

The Rival Modes is a 1727 comedy play by the British writer James Moore Smythe.

The original Drury Lane cast included Colley Cibber as the Earl of Late Airs, Theophilus Cibber as Lord Toupet, John Harper as Sir Oliver Bruin, Robert Wilks as Ballamine, John Mills as Sagely, Henry Norris as Henry, Joe Miller as George, Anne Oldfield as Amoret, Mary Porter as Melissa and Christiana Horton as Clary.

== Bibliography ==
- Burling, William J. A Checklist of New Plays and Entertainments on the London Stage, 1700-1737. Fairleigh Dickinson Univ Press, 1992.
- Nicoll, Allardyce. History of English Drama, 1660-1900, Volume 2. Cambridge University Press, 2009.
