= Paymaster of the Honourable Corps of Gentlemen at Arms =

The office of Paymaster of the Honourable Corps of Gentlemen at Arms and the office of Co-Paymaster of the Honourable Corps of Gentlemen at Arms, were offices created under the Great Seal of the Realm. These offices were appointed under letters patent, which were mostly for the life of the officeholder. The first appointment was on 30 October 1660.

== List of officers ==
- 30 October 1660: Sir Lewis Kirk
- 1 September 1664: John Kirk
- 1 December 1685: Sir William Thomas, 1st Baronet
- 4 April 1689: William Smythe, esq.
- 31 May 1718: William Moore, MP, Co-Paymaster
- 31 May 1718: James Moore Smythe, Co-Paymaster
- 31 May 1718: Arthur Moore Smythe, Co-Paymaster
- 1 May 1735: Sir Salisbury Cade
- 12 March 1761: C. Lloyd
- 29 June 1765: P. Cade
- 17 June 1799: R. Hunn
- 21 December 1803: William Gifford
- 2 May 1827: Sir William Boothby, 8th Baronet
