= Art and Nature =

Play by James Miller

- Original language: English
- Written by: James Miller
- Genre: Comedy

Premiere
- Date: 16 February 1738
- Place: Theatre Royal, Drury Lane

Art and Nature is a 1738 comedy play by the British writer James Miller. The play received a rough reception from what Miller described a "faction" in the Drury Lane audience, and its run was not extended beyond a single night. He described its subsequent publication as an attempt to vindicate himself.

The original Drury Lane cast included Benjamin Griffin as Sir Simon Dupe, William Mills as Truemore, James Quin as Outside, Theophilus Cibber as Julio, Joe Miller as Jeffrey, Richard Winstone as Constable, Margaret Mills as Flaminia and Kitty Clive as Violetta.

== Bibliography ==
- Baines, Paul & Ferarro, Julian & Rogers, Pat. The Wiley-Blackwell Encyclopedia of Eighteenth-Century Writers and Writing, 1660-1789. Wiley-Blackwell, 2011.
- Nicoll, Allardyce. History of English Drama, 1660-1900, Volume 2. Cambridge University Press, 2009.
- Swindells, Julia & Taylor, David Francis. The Oxford Handbook of the Georgian Theatre 1737-1832. OUP, 2014.
