= The Mother-in-Law =

1734 play

- Original language: English
- Written by: James Miller
- Genre: Comedy

Premiere
- Date: 12 February 1734
- Place: Haymarket Theatre

The Mother-in-Law is a 1734 comedy play by the British writer James Miller. Also known by the longer title The Mother-in-Law, or the Doctor the Disease it debuted at the Haymarket Theatre in London.

The original Haymarket cast included Benjamin Griffin as Sir Credulous Hippish, John Mills as Heartwell, William Mills as Beaumont, Benjamin Johnson as Doctor Mummy, Joe Miller as Doctor Discordiam, Theophilus Cibber as Looby Headpiece, John Harper as Galleypot, James Oates as Poet, Hannah Pritchard as Belina and Mary Heron as Primrose.

== Bibliography ==
- Baines, Paul & Ferarro, Julian & Rogers, Pat. The Wiley-Blackwell Encyclopedia of Eighteenth-Century Writers and Writing, 1660-1789. Wiley-Blackwell, 2011.
- Nicoll, Allardyce. History of English Drama, 1660-1900, Volume 2. Cambridge University Press, 2009.
