= Kitty Clive =

English actress (1711–1785)

Catherine Clive
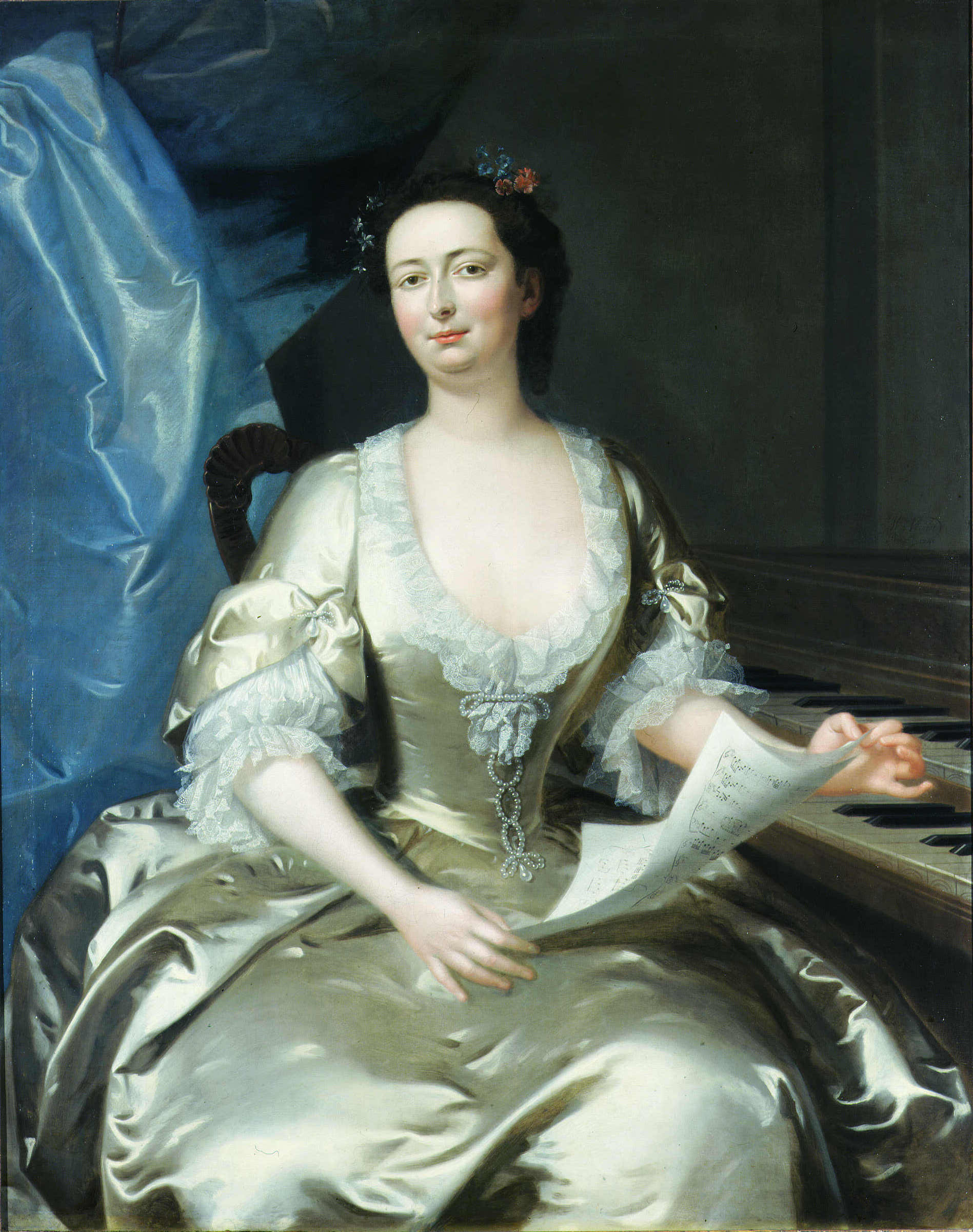
- Portrait by William Verelst, 1740.
- Born: Catherine Raftor ca. 1711
- Died: 6 December 1785

Catherine "Kitty" Clive (née Raftor; ca. 1711 – 6 December 1785, active 1728–1769) was a first songster and star comedienne of British playhouse entertainment. Clive led and created new forms of English musical theatre. She was celebrated both in high-style parts – singing, for instance, Handel’s music for her in Messiah, Samson, and The Way of the World – and in low-style ballad opera roles. Her likeness was printed and traded in unprecedented volume. She championed women’s rights throughout her career.

An image crisis in the late 1740s forced Clive to quit serious song and instead lampoon herself on stage. Though this self-ridicule won Clive public favour back, and she reigned as first comedienne until her retirement in 1769, the strategy’s very success caused her musical legacy to be slighted and forgotten. A definitive biography of Clive by Berta Joncus appeared in 2019.

== Background ==
Clive was the daughter of William Raftor (variant spelling: Rafter), a dispossessed Jacobite Catholic landowner from Kilkenny, Ireland who emigrated to London and married Elizabeth Daniell, a leather-seller’s daughter. The precise date of Clive’s birth and her baptismal name are unclear: historians have noted the baptismal record of 'Ellenor Raftor,' 15 July 1711, in the Registers of St Paul’s Covent Garden, and proposed that her name had been changed from Ellenor to Catherine. However it has been more recently discovered that Eleanor, daughter of William Rafter, was buried 30 January 1713/14, as recorded in the burial register of St Giles in the Fields. Clive wrote late in life that she had been born on 15 November 1711. She may have been born one or two years earlier, as the marriage allegation for her marriage to George Clive in 1731 stated she was a "spinster aged upwards of twenty one years."

Clive’s earliest biographer, Drury Lane prompter William Chetwood, relates how she first came to perform at that theatre. The wild popularity of Lincoln’s Inn Fields’ The Beggar’s Opera and its 17-year-old star Lavinia Fenton from January 1728 inspired Drury Lane manager Colley Cibber to hire his own 17-year-old soprano-actress. Clive auditioned for Cibber at the instigation of both his son, Theophilus, and of Chetwood, who was the younger Cibber’s housemate. Clive’s singing master, Henry Carey, who created her earliest vehicles, may also have had a hand in the audition: he had been Drury Lane’s composer from 1714 to 1717, and from 1723 had begun again to supply it with music.

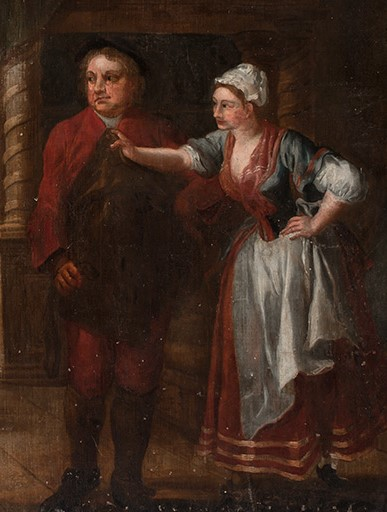
Francis Hayman and studio, A Scene in ‘The Devil to Pay’, 1730s. Oil on canvas. By permission of the owner.

Unlike Fenton, Clive was a gifted and professionally trained musician. For her official debut (2 January 1729) she played Dorinda in The Tempest, singing the Purcellian air ‘Dear pretty Youth’. English airs, in masques especially, quickly became central to Clive’s repertory. Later that month. Cibber launched his own form of ballad opera, a ‘pastoral’ which, with Clive leading its comic subplot, was meant to compete with The Beggar’s Opera. Titled Love in a Riddle, it came close to being hissed off the boards on its first night – a fate it avoided, by report, only because of the charm of Clive’s singing.

Clive’s popular breakthrough in ballad opera would not come until two and a half years later, when she first played Nell in The Devil to Pay (6 August 1731). This was a production of the Drury Lane Summer Company, an ad hoc group performing after the regular season and run by Theophilus Cibber. The Irish player Charles Coffey helped ‘operatize’ an old farce called The Devil of a Wife (1686), which extolled wife-beating. It was almost certainly Coffey who both chose the piece’s polite common tunes and wrote its spirited verses for Clive. Through her performance of these numbers, Clive transformed her role – in the playbook an abused, submissive cobbler’s wife – into that of a sprightly heroine who enraptured audiences. To showcase ‘Nell’ during the 1731-32 regular season, The Devil to Pay was swiftly cut down into a sentimental afterpiece with a climactic duet, arranged from a Handel aria, for Clive and Irish tenor Charles Stoppelaer. During the 1730s, Francis Hayman painted Clive in performance Nell; this huge oil, which was engraved several times, hung in the supper boxes at Vauxhall Pleasure Gardens. The Clive-centred afterpiece version of The Devil to Pay was later translated and exported to Paris and Leipzig, where it seeded the new genres of opéra comique and Singspiel.

== Successes and image wars ==
In the wake of Clive’s acclaim as Nell, the Cibbers father and son duo began from 1732 to mount a series of Clive comic vehicles written by Henry Fielding, whose 1730 ballad opera The Author’s Farce at a fringe theatre had made a splash. Fielding’s Clive vehicles departed sharply from the vocal and stage lines Carey had until then helped create for his former pupil. Instead of Anglicized high-style airs, Fielding reset low common tunes, rich in sexual innuendo. Instead of sprightly, upright heroines, Fielding’s dramatis personae for Clive lost their maidenheads, their morals, and their minds. However, the partnership did not start well, as Fielding botched Clive’s first-ever spoken principal part in The Covent Garden Tragedy (1 June 1732). Fielding set this mock-tragedy in the Rose Tavern, an infamous brothel whose real-life personnel he lightly fictionalized, with Clive as the chief doxy. Audiences recoiled, and the show closed. Fielding, backed by summer manager Theophilus, had then to scramble to replace it with The Mock Doctor (23 June 1732), an ‘operatized’ version of Molière’s Le Médecin malgré lui, whose wife-beating scenes were co-extensive with the action of The Devil to Pay. A hit, The Mock Doctor ushered in Clive’s new line of smart female protagonists in translated French comedies. This stage type was to be mined throughout her career by Fielding, later Clive vehicle writers, and Clive herself. In his adaptations of Molière’s The Miser (1733) and Regnard’s The Intriguing Chambermaid (1734), Fielding cemented Clive’s ownership of precocious chambermaid roles. From 1733, several engravers printed Clive’s actual likeness; previously the only available image of ‘Miss Rafter’ had been a mezzotint of a half-naked nymph from a seventeenth-century oil.

In the spring of 1733, Clive became embroiled in her first clash with theatre managers. Theophilus Cibber, angered not to have inherited the management of Drury Lane from his father, persuaded most of its players to quit and join his rival company. Clive stayed on at Drury Lane – possibly to gain new parts, particularly those formerly owned by the recently-deceased star comedienne Anne Oldfield – as did Fielding, who continued to write Clive vehicles. In the ensuing court battle, Chief Justice Philip Yorke sided with Theophilus Cibber, who returned with his company in March 1734 to co-manage Drury Lane alongside a new investor, Charles Fleetwood. During the rebellion, Clive had been attacked in the press as ‘Miss Prudely Crotchet’, a scheming songster who pretended to modesty while arrogantly advancing her ambition. Fielding had defended Clive, praising her real and imagined qualities in his playbook introductions.

Appearing on a theatre bill dated 5 October 1733 for the first time as 'Mrs. Clive,' she was assumed to have married in 1733 the non-practicing barrister George Clive, scion of Shropshire landed gentry and uncle of the later Major-General Robert Clive (‘Clive of India’). The marriage actually took place on 30 March 1731 at the church of St Mary le Savoy. This marriage was almost certainly a sham, from Kitty’s side to win a respectable name while shielding her earnings from any husband, from George’s side to disguise his passionate interest in men; George Clive went on to live with an older barrister who left him a considerable inheritance.

In 1734, the Molière translator James Miller supplanted Fielding as Drury Lane’s writer of Clive vehicles. Miller wrote French-sourced parts and witty epilogues for her; these included The Coffee House (1738, after Jean-Baptiste Rousseau), whose ‘Life of a Beau’ – Carey wrote the music, Miller the words – became one of Clive’s, and the era’s, most celebrated songs.

In November 1736 Clive again opposed Theophilus Cibber, who wished to give his new wife Susannah (house composer Thomas Arne’s sister) roles understood to belong to Clive, starting with Polly in The Beggar’s Opera. For weeks Clive fought Cibber in the press; an ad hominem stage burlesque of the conflict was published, in two versions to keep up with unfolding events. Clive ultimately prevailed, winning over a hostile Drury Lane audience on 31 December 1736 with an extemporized stage speech, an event which testifies to her compelling presence as a performer.

From 1738 to 1743, Clive was at the zenith of her stardom as Britain’s premier songster. Her song and vehicles circulated nationally in print. Comus (1738) – a music vehicle for Clive as Euphrosyne, and a spoken one for Susannah Cibber, and Irish tragedienne James Quin – took London by storm, and toured to Dublin in summer of 1741. While in Dublin, Clive trained up a song in Irish Gaelic, and subsequently delivered the first-ever performance of this then-forbidden language on a licensed British stage. From 1738, Clive established herself in London as a leading Shakespearean comedienne (often with song) in revivals often instigated by the Shakespeare Ladies Club. Clive’s Portia opposite Charles Macklin’s Shylock in The Merchant of Venice (14 February 1741) entered stage lore. Handel gifted Clive an air for her 1740 season benefit – the only such composition of his career – setting for her ‘Love’s but a Frailty’ from Congreve’s The Way of the World. Handel then engaged Clive to lead his 1743 oratorio company. Handel wrote the role of Delilah in Samson to Clive’s stage line and reputation, and gave her a brief bespoke solo in Messiah.

Clive added ‘Life of a Beau’ to her parts seemingly at will. This air captures her public profile. Sung originally in propria persona (‘Miss Kitty’) in Miller’s The Coffee House, the air profiles Clive as a pert, rational, propitious female patriot calling for war against Spain. ‘Life of a Beau’ identifies the enemy at home as queer opera connoisseurs who lament the departure of the castrato Farinelli, who had in fact quit London for the Spanish court. Apart from their popularity, Clive’s repeated, self-instigated staging of homophobia may have helped screen the irregularity of her arrangement with George Clive.

== Image crisis ==
By the early 1740s, Clive was the Drury Lane company’s top-paid player, and this precipitated her gravest career crisis. Charles Fleetwood, by now manager, was a gambling addict who began diverting the wages of company members to pay his debts.

By 1743, Clive was desperate. She, Macklin, and rising star David Garrick incited their fellow players to quit. However, due to the Licensing Act 1737, which banned all but the two licensed playhouses, and to collusion between the managers of these two playhouses, the rebel players become homeless. Fleetwood had struck a deal with Covent Garden manager John Rich to either refuse employment to the rebels or hire them at lower salaries. Clive and her followers, who included her singing partner John Beard and her protégée Mary Edwards, crossed over to Covent Garden only to find themselves doubly victimized: not only was Rich offering less than Fleetwood, but he refused to pay them at all.

A press war raged, particularly after Garrick returned to Drury Lane after having vowed (according to Macklin) to act only in concert with the other rebel players. Clive defended herself in the pamphlet The Case of Mrs. Clive (1744). In response, Fleetwood charged Clive and Garrick with earning above their social station, and published Clive’s annual income of about £700 (around £140,000 today). With this disclosure, earlier assertions that Clive was greedy, vain, and jealous gained new currency, and overshadowed her eventual return to Drury Lane. An illustrated ballad of 1746 pretended to report on a ‘Scuffle’ in the green room between the male supporters of Clive and rival comedienne Peg Woffington, and that same year Susannah Cibber published subtly insulting reports about Clive. By 1747, according to Samuel Foote, Clive’s once-storied ‘Popularity’ seemed now ‘of Little Consequence’.

== Caricatures, stage writings and post-1750 career ==
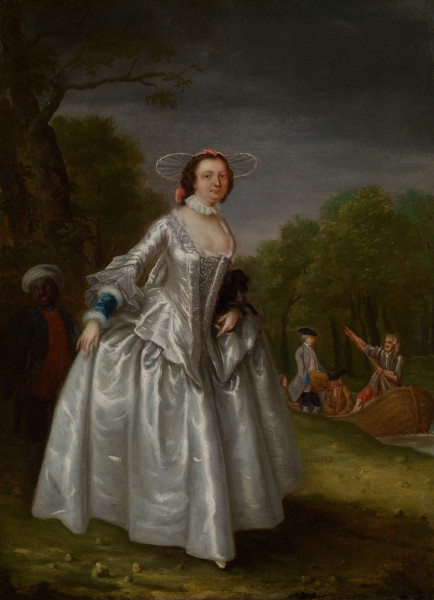
Kitty Clive as Mrs Riot by Peter Van Bleeck c. 1750

David Garrick, now co-manager of Drury Lane, strove to recover Clive’s following. Revising his 1740 Clive vehicle Lethe, in 1749 Garrick created the character of ‘Mrs Riot’ – an in propria persona role for Clive, with songs by Arne, that mocked Clive’s alleged foibles and perhaps also hinted at the same-sex desire suggested by Clive’s vitriol against men in epilogues, her declarations of love to her protégée Jane Pope in post-retirement letters, and posthumous claims that Clive was a ‘Sapphist’. As Garrick’s Mrs. Riot, a mannish gambler untethered from spousal control, Clive was formidable; helped by lots of puffing from Garrick, Lethe became a stage staple. Clive quickly found a new popularity in self-wounding roles, typically as a blousy, aged Fine Lady in plays such as Catharine and Petruchio (1754), High Life Below Stairs (1759) and The Clandestine Marriage (1766).

Since 1740, Clive had protested publicly against anti-female bias, especially the bias against women writers. Clive’s first self-authored afterpiece, The Rehearsal, or Bayes in Petticoats (1750), championed female playwrights, and she occasionally led new comedies written by women, such as Frances Sheridan's The Dupe (1763) and Elizabeth Griffith’s The Platonick Wife (1765) and The School for Rakes (1769). Clive channeled her musicianship after 1750 into burlesque, either baiting herself (as in the 1749 mock-pastoral The Chaplet and its 1751 sequel The Shepherd’s Lottery and the 1754 London ‘Prentice, an ‘operetta’ with music by Willem de Fesch) or ‘taking off’ reigning Italian prima donne – as she had first done in Fielding’s Miss Lucy in Town (1742) – in mock musical numbers for which she earned separate billing in advertisements.

Clive’s writings contain crucial evidence about her career, her reliance on Irish theatre personnel in London, and the 18th century British playhouse generally. In addition to her 1744 pamphlet and her earlier letters to the press, from 1750 she added her own afterpieces to her season benefits. In The Rehearsal, she re-versified a c.1740 masque by Boyce to tie off her career as a serious singer. Her other afterpieces – Every Woman in her Humour (1760) and Sketch of a Fine Lady’s Return from a Rout (1763) – are not easily available, nor is her extant correspondence.

Clive retired from the stage in 1769. By 1754. she had taken up residence at Little Strawberry Hill, a cottage provided for her by her friend Horace Walpole, who named it "Clive's Den" or Cliveden. In a letter written Sept. 7, 1782 to Earl Harcourt, Walpole remarked, "Dame Cliveden is the only heroine amongst all us old dowagers; she is so much recovered that she ventures to go out cruising on all the neighbours, and has made a miraculous draught of fishes." In a letter to his friend George Montagu, he wrote "Strawberry is in perfection...the orange-trees are loaded with blossoms, the Gallery all sun and gold, Mrs. Clive all sun and vermilion." Clive was in great demand at card parties and conversational soirees. Boswell quoted his friend Samuel Johnson who said of her, "Clive, Sir, is a good thing to sit by; she always understands what you say." She died on December 6, 1785, and was buried in the churchyard at St Mary's Church, Twickenham. A plaque to her memory is affixed to the outside wall of the church with a poem written by her friend, the actress Jane Pope.

In 1796. it was reported burial was sought for her in Westminster Abbey but Samuel Horsley, its then Dean, was said to have tartly refused the request, stating:

if we do not draw some line in this theatrical ambition to mortuary fame, we shall soon make Westminster Abbey little better than a Gothic Green Room!

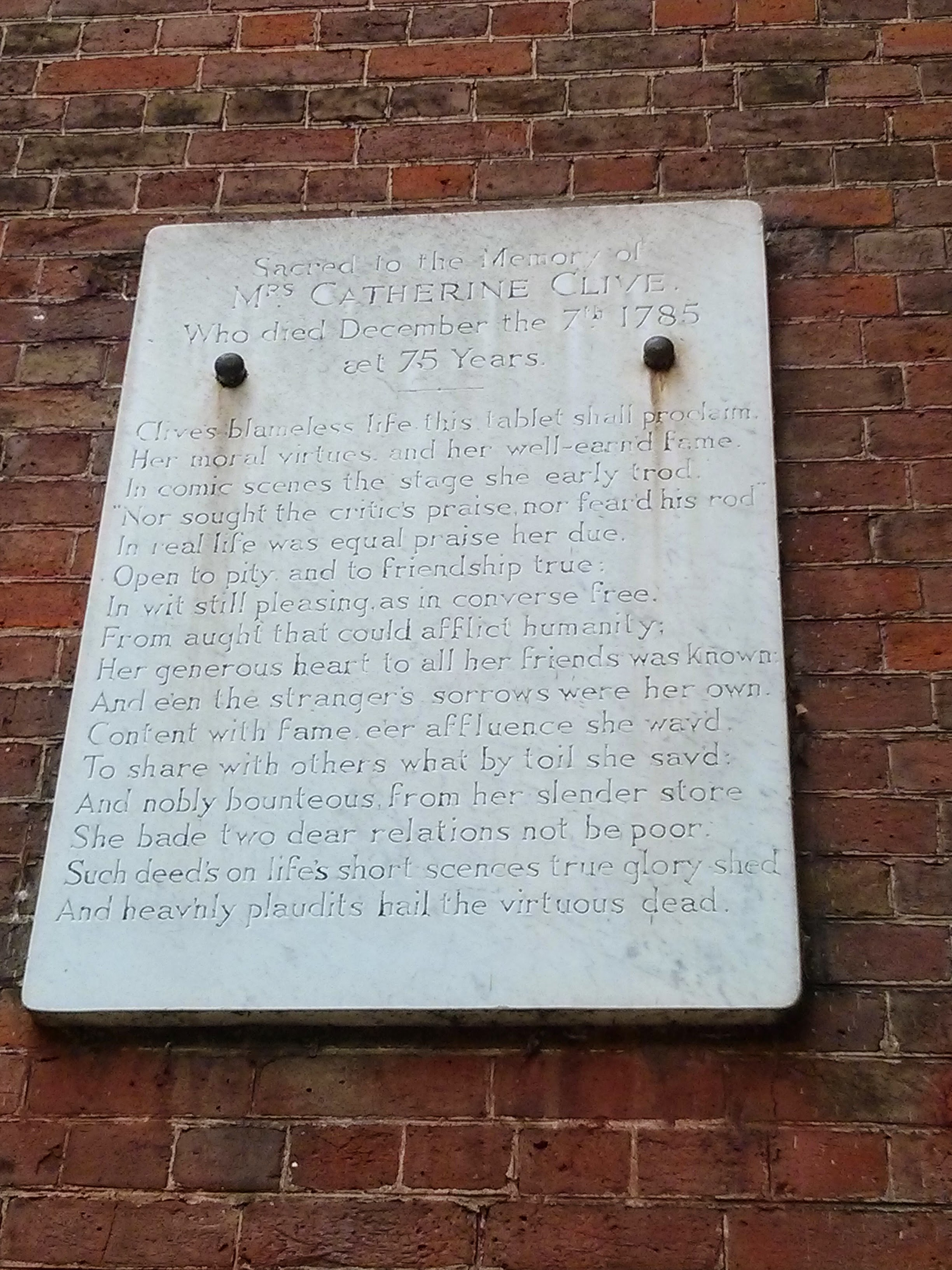
Catherine Clive commemorative plaque

== Selected performances ==
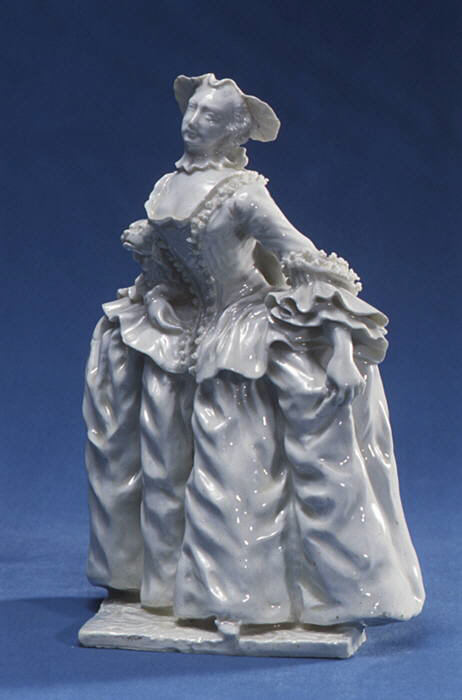
Figure in Bow porcelain, c. 1750, as Mrs Riot. With its pair of Henry Woodward, perhaps the earliest English porcelain figures.

- Rosella in The Village Opera by Charles Johnson (1729)
- Phillida in Love in a Riddle by Colley Cibber (1729)
- Kitty in The Humours of Oxford by James Miller (1730)
- Dulceda in Bayes's Opera by Gabriel Odingsells (1730)
- Nell in The Devil to Pay by Charles Coffey (1731)
- Chlose in The Lottery by Henry Fielding (1732)
- Mercury in Timon in Love by John Kelly 1733)
- Maria in The Man of Taste by James Miller (1735)
- Liberia in The Universal Passion by James Miller (1737)
- Violetta in Art and Nature by James Miller (1738)
- Miss Kitty in The Coffee House by James Miller (1738)
- Rosamond in Rosamond by Thomas Arne (1740)
- Tag in Miss in Her Teens by David Garrick (1747)
- Mrs. Riot in Lethe by David Garrick (1749)
- Kitty in High Life Below Stairs by James Townley (1759)
- Muslin in The Way to Keep Him by Arthur Murphy (1760)
- Lady Freelove in The Jealous Wife by George Coleman the Elder (1761)
- Lady Beverly in The School for Lovers by William Whitehead (1762)
- Mrs. Heidelberg in The Clandestine Marriage by George Coleman the Elder (1766)
- Sift in The Widowed Wife by William Kenrick (1767)
- Mrs Winifred in The School for Rakes by Elizabeth Griffith (1769)

== References and sources ==
References
