= Whig and Tory =

1720 play

- Original language: English
- Written by: Benjamin Griffin
- Genre: Comedy

Premiere
- Date: 26 January 1720
- Place: Lincoln's Inn Fields Theatre

Whig and Tory is a 1720 comedy play by the British writer and actor Benjamin Griffin. Griffin himself starred as Sir John Indolent with Mrs Gulick as Charlotte. John Harper played Sir Roland Heartfree, Christopher Bullock was Ned Indolent, Lacy Ryan was Reynard and William Bullock was Coblecause.

It was revived at the Drury Lane Theatre in 1729.

== Bibliography ==
- Burling, William J. A Checklist of New Plays and Entertainments on the London Stage, 1700-1737. Fairleigh Dickinson Univ Press, 1992.
- Highfill, Philip H, Burnim, Kalman A. & Langhans, Edward A. A Biographical Dictionary of Actors, Actresses, Musicians, Dancers, Managers, and Other Stage Personnel in London, 1660-1800: Garrick to Gyngell. SIU Press, 1978.
- Kearn, Jean B. Dramatic Satire in the Age of Walpole, 1720-1750. Iowa State University Press, 1976.
