= The Universal Gallant =

1735 play

- Original language: English
- Written by: Henry Fielding
- Genre: Comedy

Premiere
- Date: 10 February 1735
- Place: Theatre Royal, Drury Lane

The Universal Gallant, or The Different Husbands is a 1735 comedy play by the British writer Henry Fielding.

The original Drury Lane cast included James Quin as Mondish, William Mills as Gaylove, Theophilus Cibber as Captain Spark, Benjamin Griffin as Sir Simon Raffler, John Harper as Colonel Raffler and Mary Heron as Mrs Raffler.

Fielding dedicated the work to Charles Spencer, 3rd Duke of Marlborough. It was not a success and met a hostile reception its opening night, and lasted for only three performances.

== Bibliography ==
- Burling, William J. A Checklist of New Plays and Entertainments on the London Stage, 1700-1737. Fairleigh Dickinson Univ Press, 1992.
- Cleary, Thomas R. Henry Fielding: A Political Writer. Wilfrid Laurier Univ. Press, 2006.
- Nicoll, Allardyce. A History of Early Eighteenth Century Drama: 1700-1750. CUP Archive, 1927.

== See also ==
The Journal of a Voyage to Lisbon
