= Frances Cross =

British stage actress (1707–1781)

Frances Cross (1707–1781) was a British stage actress.

From 1727 as Frances Shireburn she appeared at the Drury Lane Theatre. During her early years she established herself in a number of roles that she played repeatedly throughout her career including in Lady Darling in The Constant Couple, Mademoiselle D'Epingle in The Funeral, Mademoiselle in The Provoked Wife and Regan in King Lear, Lady Bountiful in The Beaux' Stratagem and Mrs Motherly in The Provoked Husband. She also appeared at Bartholomew Fair during the summer months. From 1735 she became involved in with fellow actor Richard Cross and began styling herself as Mrs Cross, although she did not formally marry him until 1751. She was widowed in 1760, and had a son also named Richard Cross who appeared alongside her at Drury Lane.

Apart from during the Actor Rebellion of 1733 when she briefly moved to the Haymarket Theatre and two seasons at Covent Garden from 1739 and 1741, she spent the remainder of her career as an established part of the Drury Lane company. She has been described as a "workhorse" of the company playing numerous new roles as well as established ones each year, "rarely getting leading roles, but seldom being assigned tiny ones".

Cross died on 29 June 1781 in Hart Street, Bloomsbury.

== Bibliography ==
- Highfill, Philip H, Burnim, Kalman A. & Langhans, Edward A. A Biographical Dictionary of Actors, Actresses, Musicians, Dancers, Managers, and Other Stage Personnel in London, 1660-1800: West to Zwingman. SIU Press, 1973.
