= The Provoked Husband =

1728 play

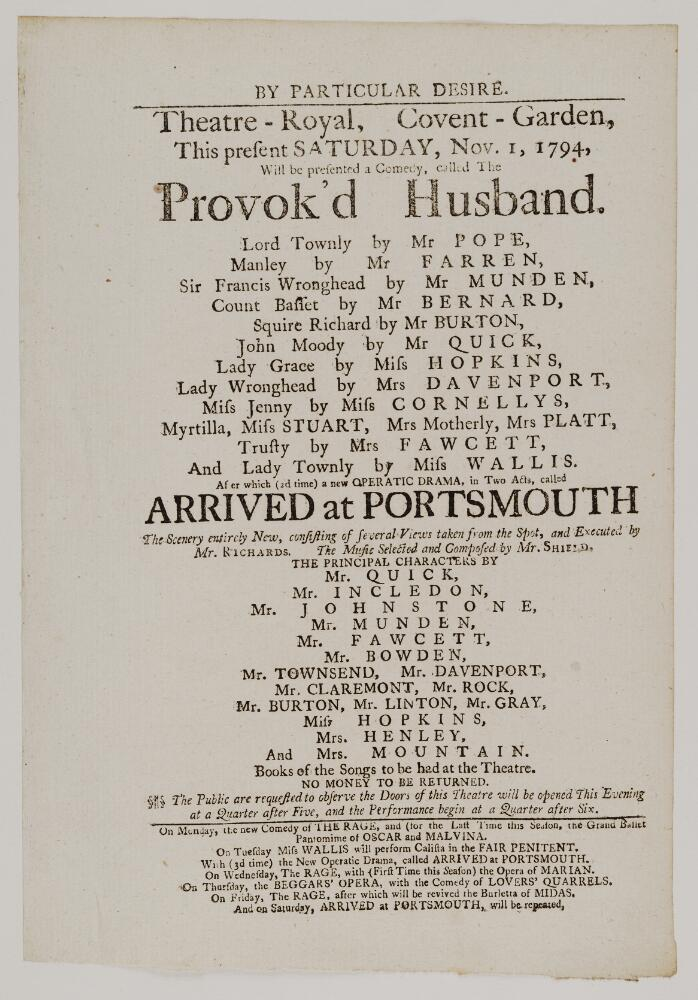
- 1794 Covent Garden playbill
- Original language: English
- Written by: Colley Cibber; John Vanbrugh
- Genre: Comedy

Premiere
- Date: 10 January 1728
- Place: Theatre Royal, Drury Lane

The Provoked Husband is a 1728 comedy play by the British writer and actor Colley Cibber, based on a fragment of play written by John Vanbrugh. It is also known by the longer title The Provok'd Husband: or, a Journey to London.

Vanbrugh had worked on a projected play A Journey to London for Cibber, a sharp comedy in the Restoration-style. Unfinished at his death in 1726, Vanbrugh left the manuscript to him. In need of a new play for the Drury Lane Theatre where he was a manager, Cibber finished it under a new title The Provoked Husband which echoed one of Vanbrugh's most popular works The Provoked Wife. He reworked it substantially, softening the character of Lady Loverule who was renamed Lady Townly, and adding a more conventional happy ending than Vanbrugh had intended.

The original cast included Robert Wilks as Lord Townly, Anne Oldfield as Lady Townly, Mary Porter as Lady Grace, John Mills as Manly, Colley Cibber as Sir Francis Wronghead, Sarah Thurmond as Lady Wronghead, Jane Cibber as Jenny, Joe Miller as Moody and Roger Bridgewater as Count Basset.

The play was a huge success and enjoyed a lengthy run at the theatre, boosting the finances of the struggling Drury Lane. It appeared to be the hit of the season, only to be eclipsed by the even more dramatic success of John Gay's The Beggar's Opera which opened three weeks later at the rival Lincoln's Inn Fields Theatre. The Provoked Husband was revived frequently over the following century, become a staple part of the repertory in many theatres.

== Bibliography ==
- Burling, William J. A Checklist of New Plays and Entertainments on the London Stage, 1700-1737. Fairleigh Dickinson Univ Press, 1992.
- Koon, Helene. Colley Cibber: A Biography. University Press of Kentucky, 2014.
- Nicoll, Allardyce. History of English Drama, 1660-1900, Volume 2. Cambridge University Press, 2009.
