= James Moore Smythe =

English writer (1702–1734)

James Moore Smythe (/smaɪð/; 1702 – 18 October 1734) was an English playwright and fop.

== Biography ==
James Moore's Name and William Smythe's Estate Act 1728
- Act of Parliament
- Parliament of Great Britain
- Long title: An Act to enable James Moore, and his Issue Male, to take the Surname of Smythe, according to the Will of William Smythe Esquire, deceased; and for vesting in Trustees Two Thousand Three Hundred and Sixteen Pounds, Sixteen Shillings, and Ten Pence, South Sea Annuities, Part of the Estate of the said William Smythe, to be sold, for the Purposes therein mentioned.
- Citation: 2 Geo. 2. c. 26 Pr.
- Territorial extent: Great Britain

Dates
- Royal assent: 14 May 1729
- Commencement: 21 January 1729 (Note: Start of session.)

Status: Current legislation

Smythe was appointed by the King to the office of Co-Paymaster of the Honourable Corps of Gentlemen at Arms. He was born James Moore. He was the son of Arthur Moore (c. 1660 – 4 May 1730), MP for Great Grimsby, and his second wife Theophila Smythe, dau. of William Smythe Esq., Paymaster of the Band of Pensioners, now known as the Honourable Corps of Gentlemen at Arms, and Lady Elizabeth Berkeley. His mother's maternal grandfather was George Berkeley, 1st Earl of Berkeley and his mother carried the last name Smythe. Moore graduated from All Souls College, Oxford with a Bachelor of Arts in 1722. During his college years, he had a reputation for wittiness and a great attention to fashion. He was referred to by the informal name "Jemmy." When his grandfather (William Smythe) died in 1720, he left estates to Moore on condition that he change his name to Smythe, which he did by a private act of Parliament, James Moore's Name and William Smythe's Estate Act 1728 (2 Geo. 2. c. 26 Pr.).

Moore Smythe was profligate, and even with inherited estates ran up substantial debts. Furthermore, he had offended several persons in society, and particularly tories. In 1727, he wrote his only play, The Rival Modes, and the Drury Lane company under the direction of Colley Cibber and Robert Wilks acted it. Smythe packed the audience in hopes of raising money, but the play was not well received. The opening night audience included many to whom Smythe owed money. The play ran for six nights, which was a mediocre run. However, Smythe received £300 for the author's benefit night.

Smythe's place in Alexander Pope's The Dunciad comes primarily from this play. In the second act, Smythe quoted eight lines of Pope's poetry. It appears that Pope had given and then revoked permission for the use of the lines, but Smythe went ahead anyway. This earned him Pope's wrath, and he was already despised by the other Tory wits. In The Dunciad of 1727, Pope presents Moore as a "phantom poet" whom all the book sellers are desperate to court. This is partially because of the piracy (Moore does not indicate his source or credit Pope), but it is more because Bernard Lintot offered Moore Smythe the incredible sum of £130 for the publication rights to the play. (In contrast, Leonard Welsted had had a much greater theatrical success in 1726 with The Dissembled Woman and had received only £30 for the publication rights.) Lintot probably suspected that the controversy would mean sales and that Moore was a new Whig hero. On the last score, at least, he would have been correct.

Edward Cooke, in his Battel of the Poets of 1729, proclaimed Moore a "new Dryden." Other "dunces" from The Dunciad began to support and collaborate with Moore, and Leonard Welsted joined with Moore in writing One Letter to Mr Pope in 1730. Moore, despite having no poetic career before the play and virtually no career after it, was being lauded, and this despite what Edward Young called "a very bad" play. Moore Smythe appeared to be a nobleman, a man of fashion, and an anti-Tory, and in The Dunciad he is presented as a great, vacuous nothing whose jingling coat and supposedly jingling pockets induce the mercenary book sellers into a frenzy. When they reach Moore, they find that he has nothing of his own, including his clothes.

In 1730, Pope renewed this characterisation of Moore Smythe. In The Grub-Street Journal for May and June, Pope wrote:

A Gold watch found on a Cinder Whore,
Or a good verse on J--my M-re,
Proves but what either shou'd conceal,
Not that they're rich, but that they steal.

In each attack, Pope characterises Moore primarily as a plagiarist. When the book sellers reach their "Phantom Moore" in The Dunciad, all the poetry in his collection flies back to the poets it was stolen from. Pope indicates that Moore stole not only from him, but from Dryden, from John Arbuthnot, and from others. In the context of The Dunciad, Moore stands not just for the generally degraded fop, nor for the imprudent heir of a fortune, but for the avarice and stupidity of book sellers (exemplified by Edmund Curll) who would publish anything at all, regardless of value, if it looked like it would sell. Thus, Moore Smythe's calculated gesture of using his notoriety to sell seats in the playhouse and the book sellers who would count upon that notoriety to sell copies of the play were mirrored sides of a critique of an emergent mass market for literature, and Pope's primary target is the abandonment of standards of quality.

After his quarrel with Pope, Moore Smythe continued in his debts and insolvency. He died unmarried and in poverty on 18 October 1734. The next year, in Epistle to Dr. Arbuthnot, Pope again attacked Moore Smythe as a plagiarist. Since his day, Moore Smythe has been remembered almost exclusively as Pope presented him, as a noble-born dunce.

== Bibliography ==
- Carter, Philip. "James Moore Smythe". In Matthew, H. C. G., and Brian Harrison, eds. The Oxford Dictionary of National Biography. vol. 51, 461. London: Oxford University Press, 2004.
