= The Miser (Fielding play) =

1733 play

- Original language: English
- Written by: Henry Fielding
- Based on: The Miser by Moliere
- Genre: Comedy

Premiere
- Date: 17 February 1733
- Place: Theatre Royal, Drury Lane

The Miser is a 1733 comedy play by the British writer Henry Fielding. It is an English-language adaptation of Molière's The Miser. It was a success, running for twenty five performances by May 1733.

The original Drury Lane cast included Benjamin Griffin as Lovegold, Roger Bridgewater as Frederick, William Mills as Clerimont, Theophilus Cibber Ramilie, James Oates as Decoy, Edward Berry as Sparke and Christiana Horton as Mariana.

== Bibliography ==
- Downie, J.A. A Political Biography of Henry Fielding. Routledge, 2015.
