= William Duncombe =

British translator (1690–1769)

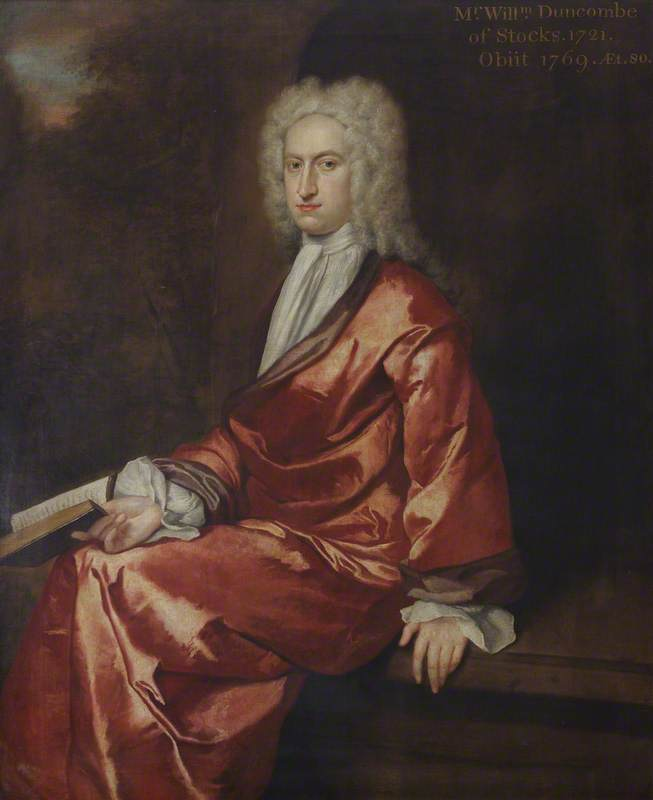
William Duncombe (1690–1769), Translator and Playwright, painting by Joseph Highmore, 1721

William Duncombe (19 January 1690 – 26 February 1769) was a British writer and playwright.

== Life ==
Duncombe worked in the Navy Office from 1706 until 1725. That year, he and Elizabeth Hughes won a very large lottery sum on a joint ticket. He married Elizabeth in 1726 and "retired into literary leisure". The nature of their match is unknown, but the two did have a son together, John, later a clergyman, writer and antiquary. Elizabeth died in 1736, leaving Duncombe a widower for 33 years.

== Works ==
Duncombe's literary work was generally in translation from Latin. He translated Horace in 1721 and translated Racine's Athalie as Athaliah in 1722. His sole successful play was Junius Brutus in 1734, which ran for six nights at Theatre Royal, Drury Lane. His competition was Farinelli singing at the Little Theatre, Haymarket, and Duncombe said that the "quivering Italian eunuch" was too much for the stiff Roman statesman. All the same, six nights was a respectable run, and the play went to a second edition in the first year it was in print, 1735. The play makes frequent appeals to "liberty," in keeping with the Patriot plays of disaffected Whigs. Duncombe, however, had apparently intended a more traditional Whig play, along the lines of Addison's Cato, for he was aligned squarely against the "Tory" Scriblerians.

Duncombe published in both the Whitehall Evening Post and the London Journal. Alexander Pope satirized the London Journal by name in The Dunciad, and Duncombe had written a letter to it criticizing John Gay's The Beggar's Opera for its vitiating effects on public morals. He had, in the letter, counterposed the sermons of Thomas Herring on Jonathan Wild and thievery. Herring, who would later become the Archbishop of Canterbury under the Hanoverians, became a friend of Duncombe's.

Duncombe wrote on education in 1744, and his The Choice of Hercules was included in Robert Dodsley's Miscellanies of 1748. Between 1757 and 1759, he and his son, John Duncombe (who married the daughter of Joseph and Susanna Highmore), published The Works of Horace in English Verse. His likeness was painted by Joseph Highmore.
