= The Modern Husband =

Play by Henry Fielding

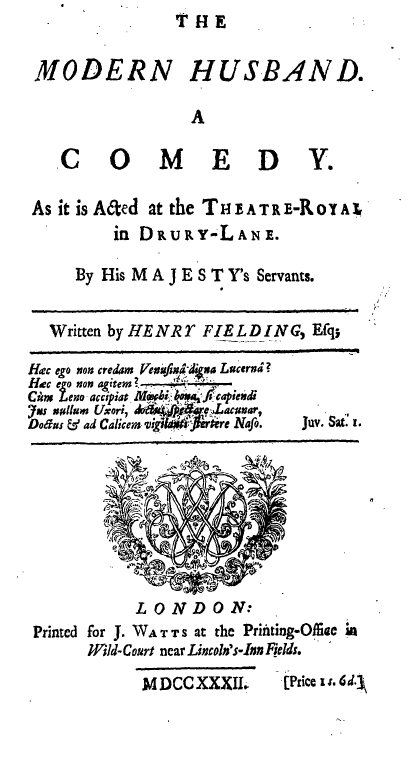
Titlepage to The Modern Husband: a Comedy

The Modern Husband is a play by Henry Fielding. It first ran on 14 February 1732 at the Royal Theatre, Drury Lane. The plot focuses on a man who sells his wife for money, but then sues for damages by adultery when the money is insufficient. The play also covers the stories of other couples and affairs and romantic pursuits.

The play criticises vice and society, but also criticised the law allowing a husband to sue for damages when his wife committed adultery. This view of marriage later served as the theme for Fielding's novel Amelia. The play was well-met when it first ran, though there were some imperfections. Later critics found the characters lacking and the plot faulty, and believed that 18th century spectators would agree. They also believed The Modern Husband to be one of the most serious of the plays written by Fielding.

== Background ==
The Modern Husband first ran on 14 February 1732. Fielding put a lot of effort into crafting The Modern Husband and, as he admits in the prologue, sought to come up with something new. He first drafted the play in September 1730 and sent it to Lady Mary Montagu for her opinion. The play was produced on stage for 13 nights, which only The Provoked Husband and Zara ran for as long during that time at Drury Lane. Although early 20th century critics believed that the play could not be popular, it did make money and even put on a benefit show on 2 March 1732. The play was not revived later, possibly because the principal actors of the play died soon after and that the plot of the play discouraged new actors from wanting to play the parts.

== Cast ==
The original text included the following cast:

- Mr. Modern
- Mrs. Modern
- Lord Richly
- Mr Bellamant
- Mrs Bellamant
- Captain Bellamant – Son of the Bellamants, played by Theophilus Cibber
- Emilia Bellamant – Daughter of the Bellamants
- Mr Gaywit – Lord Richly's nephew

== Plot ==
To make money, Mr Modern decides to trade his wife for money from Captain Bellamant. The money was not enough to satisfy Mr Modern, so he sues Lord Richly for damages by adultery. A witness is found to reveal that Mr Modern originally sold his wife to Lord Richly, which undermines his case and he is unable to gain the extra money. During this time, another couple, the Bellamants, are paralleled to the Moderns. Mr Bellamant is involved in an affair with Mrs Modern until Mr Modern catches them. Mrs Bellamant forgives Mr Bellamant for his actions. Other characters through the play are involved with their own romantic pursuits, including the Bellamants' son, Captain Bellamant, who pursues and marries Lady Charlotte Gaywit, and their daughter, Emilia, who marries Mr Gaywit, another of Mrs Modern's lovers.

== Themes ==
As the epigraph to the print edition from Juvenal reinforces, the play criticises vice and society. In particular, Fielding criticises a law that allowed a husband to sue for damages when his wife commits adultery. Such incidents occurred regularly during the 18th century, and even Theophilus Cibber, who played Captain Bellamant, sued William Sloper through the very law. However, Cibber followed the role of Mr. Modern in his actions. Fielding's view of marriage in The Modern Husband was a theme later picked up in his novel Amelia.

== Critical response ==
The Daily Post on 3 March 1732 described a benefit run of the play: "Last Night their Majesties, his Royal Highness the Prince of Wales, their Highnesses the Princesses, and the whole Royal Family, were to see the new Comedy, call'd the Modern Husband, acted to a splendid Crowded Audience, for the Benefit of Mrs. Porter. This play has been performed thirteen Nights with Applause, to very good Audiences, but is now discontinued, on account of the Indisposition of a principal Actress." Not every response was as kind, and the Grub-street Journal on 30 March 1732 criticises the play, the plot, and attacks the character of Lady Charlotte as unrealistic. However, Fielding alludes that Lady Mary Montagu believed that the character of Lady Charlotte was true to life. Furthermore, even the 30 March 1732 Grub-street Journal stated that the play was viewed favourably by audiences, and 29 June 1731 piece in the journal says that the play was met with encouragement. In June 1732, Thomas Cooke, in his play The Comedian, supported his friend against the critique on 30 March saying that there is great wit and comedy within the play even if there were some imperfections caused by hastily writing the play.

Later critics, Wilbur Cross and F. H. Dudden, believe that the characters were lacking and the plot was faulty. It is uncertain as to if 18th century spectators agree, but Cross and Dudden believe that the audiences would have agreed with their assessment, with Cross claiming that the audience hissed during the first night. Likewise, H. K. Banerji believed that the play was "a complete failure". Robert Hume characterises the play as a "genuine satire (a rarity in English comedy), and it offers one of the darkest comic visions of society since Otway's bitter Friendship in Fashion (1678)." However, he later states that "the play itself is badly flawed". Hume attributes the popularity of the play to Fielding himself, and that the passing of its main actors and the problems with plot discouraged it from being produced again. Like other critics, Hume believes that most critics support the 30 March 1732 criticism of the play that reveals many of the problems within the play. However, the play was dedicated to Walpole and Fielding was working with Colley Cibber, two aspects that encouraged some early criticism of the play by those like the Grub-street Journal. Regardless of the draw backs, Tiffany Potter declared The Modern Husband as "Fielding's most serious attempt at social commentary within the five-act comedic form, with situations, characters, and social states resembling those to come in Amelia."
