= James Miller (playwright) =

English playwright, poet, librettist, and minister

James Miller (1704–1744) was an English playwright, poet, librettist, and minister.

== Biography ==
Miller was born in Bridport, Dorset on 11 August 1704, the son of a clergyman who possessed two considerable livings in the county. He studied at Wadham College, Oxford, and while there wrote part of his famous comedy, The Humours of Oxford, which contained music by Richard Charke and was first performed on 9 January 1730, to great success.

Miller's family was somewhat unsupportive of his theatrical endeavors. They had wanted him to pursue a career in business, but Miller showed a revulsion to such a path. He therefore was persuaded to follow in his father's profession as a minister, taking holy orders soon after he left Wadham. Miller became a lecturer at Trinity College, Conduit Street and a preacher at Roehampton Chapel. The livings for these positions however did not provide for the lifestyle that Miller was accustomed to, so he continued to write for the stage to supplement his income. This decision was met by some hostility by his colleagues in the church and his career as a clergyman suffered to some extent. Regardless, he went on to write eight more plays, many of which were premièred at the Theatre Royal, Drury Lane, and contained incidental music by Thomas Arne.

Miller died in Chelsea on 27 April 1744 a few days after his adaptation of Voltaire's tragedy Mahomet opened in London. He was married and had one son.

== Works ==
Miller wrote mostly comedies for the stage and he was known for his use of intelligent parody and wry wit. His known dramatic works include: The Humours of Oxford (1730), The Mother-in-Law (1734), The Man of Taste (1735), The Universal Passion (1737), The Coffee House (1737), Art and Nature (1738), An Hospital for Fools (1739), The Picture, or Cuckold in Conceit (1745), and Mahomet the Imposter (1744, completed by John Hoadly). He also wrote the libretto to George Frideric Handel's Joseph and his Brethren (1744) and translated Molière's comedies for their first publication into the English language.

Miller was also a celebrated and prolific poet, of which the satirical poem Harlequin Horace is his most well known work. Miller dedicated the poem to its subject, Mr. Rich, who was the manager of the Covent Garden Theatre at that time. The poem, an ironic portrait and arch mockery of Rich, was payback to a man who had offended Miller. Several of his poems were published in Gentleman's Magazine.

Miller also contributed some religious writings, publishing a volume of his sermons. His sermons display an air of distinguished piety, and a zeal for the interest of what Miller called 'true religion'.
