= A Narrative of the Life of Mrs. Charlotte Charke =

1755 autobiography of Charlotte Charke

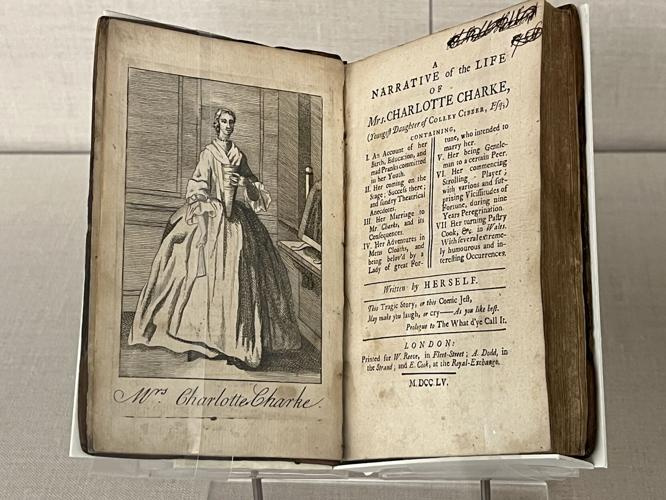
- Author: Charlotte Charke
- Genre: Autobiography
- Publication date: 1755
- Publication place: England
- Media type: Paperback
- ISBN: 1-85196-267-0

A Narrative of the Life of Mrs. Charlotte Charke is a 1755 autobiography by English actress Charlotte Charke. Her autobiography sheds light on the experiences and difficulties she faced as a woman in the public eye, providing insight into the gender dynamics of 18th-century England and her own economic struggles. Originally published as a serial, Charke claims that the narrative is an attempt to reconcile with her father, who at the time of writing had disowned her. The book sold well and was republished several times.

Charke was the daughter of the famous actor and playwright Colley Cibber and followed in his footsteps, spending much of her own life in the theater. Her narrative uses dramatic language and themes, allowing the sense of the theatre to be present in her autobiography as she takes on the role of different identities. However, much of her autobiography illustrates Charke's life off the stage, including her crossdressing. While she portrayed many breeches roles throughout her career in the theater, she often chose to cross dress under male identities in her daily life. Her autobiography documents the various occupations -sometimes male- that she assumed while crossdressing, her consistent economic deficiencies, multiple marriages, and the estrangement from her family and complications of her own.

A notable aspect of the narrative style is its episodic format, which Charke claims to have chosen for specific entertainment and to gain public opinion on the episodes of her life that are implied to be the reason for Cibber's disownment of his daughter. Through modern perspectives, this narrative can be viewed as something akin to a tell-all. Charke’s autobiography was infamous in her time for her striking, somewhat chaotic prose as she jumped from subject to subject and from job to job.

Charke's autobiographical narrative has maintained weight in many forms of modern literary criticism, most of which involve speculation around the consistent usage of crossdressing throughout her life. In the field of literature and gender studies, Charke's narrative has inspired work of to further understanding of English women's experiences in the 18th century. Patricia Meyer Spacks, Susan Paterson Glover, and Misty G. Anderson are just a few of the scholars who have delved into Charke's life and work, shedding light on the complexities of gender, performance, and identity in the 18th century.

== Synopsis ==
The Narrative of the Life of Mrs. Charlotte Charke begins with a letter written by Charke to herself. The memoir covers Charke's childhood, which was largely comfortable. She also describes her fascination with pranks at a young age.

At the beginning of Charke's acting career at Drury Lane, her father's theatre, she meets her first husband, Richard Charke. They have a daughter, Catherine, but their romance is short-lived. Due to his infidelity and gambling addiction, they separate shortly after Catherine is born. Mr. Charke flees to Jamaica with his mistress and dies shortly thereafter. This leaves Charlotte as a single parent with accumulated debt, which even lands her in jail for some time.

Charke begins to take breeches roles in her acting career as well as cross-dressing in her day-to-day life. Because of this, and reasons not stated in the memoir, Charke has a falling out with her father and is estranged from her family. She seeks his validation and forgiveness countless times and even mails him a letter in hopes of reconciliation. He sends back a blank sheet of paper, making his decision clear to her.

Charke takes on the name Charles Brown and continues to take up space in male-dominated establishments. She also faces hardships at this time, as her debt and struggle to find acting roles, leads her to jump from job to job. She lands various jobs, being a valet, a sausage maker, a farmer, a waiter, a chef, and more.

For some time, she and a close friend, Mrs. Brown, pass as a married couple and raise her daughter together. Charke eventually settles back in London. She visits her daughter and disapproves of her son-in-law. She ends her memoir with a summary of the novel's purpose, to entertain and amuse her audience or readership but states that her cross-dressing concerns no one other than herself.

== Historical context ==
=== Politics and society ===
During the early to mid eighteenth century, Great Britain was in a fairly prosperous period as it had various colonies in North America and India drawing in resources and wealth. However, this would eventually come to an end after the American Revolution in the late 1700s. The country was also undergoing significant social and cultural changes. The Enlightenment brought about a shift in intellectual thought, questioning established beliefs and promoting individualism and reason. It was a time when gender roles were strictly defined, with the expectation women would adhere to societal norms of femininity and domesticity, however, Charke defied these expectations, choosing to pursue a career in the male-dominated world of theater.

=== Literature ===
Prior to Charke's time in the mid-1700s, the autobiography was still not quite popularized. In fact, the modern autobiography did not become common, or popular, until the nineteenth century. Finding the existence of such narratives before the eighteenth century is nearly impossible and even the modern autobiography is considered to still be fairly new. Despite the autobiography becoming more common during Charke's time, it is said there are around “four hundred in total” published in the 1700s. Moreover, of those published, many women who wrote their own narratives tended to be preachers or actresses like Charke. In narratives such as these, women were said “constructing the selves they are, or want their audience to believe they are, often in opposition to received opinions”

Additionally, Great Britain at this time, the country was entering an important period of literature, culture, and the arts that continue to be important for the modern day. Some of these novels include Gulliver’s Travels, and Robinson Crusoe which detail a fictional character's individual adventures. As these novels became popular during the time period, Charlotte Charke's narration builds on this sense of individual adventure and the public's taste for such stories.

=== Key historical figures ===
As the daughter of the famous playwright Colley Cibber, Charke grew up surrounded by the theatrical world. Despite her father's disapproval, she embarked on a career as an actress, facing challenges and discrimination due to her gender. Charke's autobiography sheds light on the struggles she faced as a woman trying to navigate the male-dominated world of theater, providing a unique insight into the gender dynamics of 18th-century England. One of the key figures in Charke's life was her father, Colley Cibber who played a significant role in shaping her career and personal life. His disapproval of Charke's chosen profession as an actress highlights the societal attitudes towards women in the 18th century. His reluctance to support his daughter's career aspirations reflects the pervasive gender bias that existed during that time. Another influential figure in Charke's life was her husband, Richard Charke, a musician who struggled with his own demons and addictions. Their tumultuous relationship and eventual separation added another layer of complexity to Charke's narrative, showcasing the challenges faced by women in maintaining personal autonomy and independence during a time when marriage and family were considered the ultimate goals for women.

== Themes ==
=== Gender ===
Charke’s gender fluidity is one of the most prominent themes throughout the autobiography. Charke begins bending her gender through her attire from as young as four years old, when she puts on an adolescent performance by strolling around her neighborhood in her father’s stolen clothing. This is something she continues doing as she grows up and becomes more involved in the theater. The varying attire throughout her autobiography allows Charke to “use clothing to bend her gender, sex, social status, and identity” and by doing so as frequently as she does, “her body becomes a manifestation of gender fluidity.” Additionally, Charke uses objects and props as tools for her gender expression. Returning to the previous example of her dressing up at age four, Charke’s use of both broom and sword are phallic symbols that help her present masculinely. The broom is what she uses to actually gain access to Cibber’s clothes and wig, giving her the opportunity “to enter into the performance of her desired gender.” Then, she swaps the broom for a sword, which hinders her ability to move around freely, yet is the finishing touch on her performance. The way in which Charke picks and disgards these phallic symbols “emphasize the fluidity in her performance... as well as the awkwardness of a gender binary.” Charke is never truly ashamed of her cross-dressing and gender fluidity (except, perhaps, when it comes to the strenuous relationship she has with her father). She crossdresses liberally and repeatedly to gain new economic opportunities and escape tricky situations whenever and wherever she could. Despite this continuous use of cross-dressing, Charke never openly reveals her motivations for doing so. Rather than give readers an explanation, Charke’s audience is forced to face the “awkwardness one can feel when confronted with genders that move beyond the binarized matrix” of male and female.

=== Sexuality ===
Through Charke’s cross-dressing and embracement of both feminine and masculine identities, Charke’s sexuality is critically debated. There are some critics who believe that Charke’s cross-dressing has nothing to do with her sexuality at all, and that her cross-dressing and embracing masculine ideals is motivated more so by her need to subvert her father. Other critics' perspectives largely view Charke’s transgressive actions of cross-dressing and taking on typical male roles as something that aligns more with her gender identity rather than her sexuality, especially when considering that Charke never explicitly acknowledges her cross-dressing is due to her sexuality (though she does state it is not anyone’s business other than her own). Other critics call upon other women’s attraction to Charke while she is in disguise in order to suggest that “Charke’s self-representation displaces gendered norms from centrality and attempts instead to construct a specifically sexual identity inconsistent with gender’s binary codes.” These critics acknowledge her gender and sexuality as being linked, and that in the record of her life, she does call attention to how other women find her sexually attractive when she is passing as a man. Charke finds joy in how she is able to “keep up to the well-bred Gentlemen.” While the text does not contain many implications of sexuality outside of her two husbands, critics argue there is implicit reference of Charke’s sexual preference towards women.

=== Performance ===
Charlotte Charke’s father was Colley Cibber, a playwright and theater owner, and therefore she grew up acting in a multitude of plays. Because of Charke’s prolific career as an actress, many critics discuss how the theater and performance are intertwined into the narrative. Her attachment to the theater is also indicated by her numerous references to popular plays of the time in her narrative, as well as her consistent return to the stage throughout her life. Thus, it makes sense that her autobiography itself could be seen as a performance. This becomes evident at the very beginning of A Narrative, when Charke writes and addresses a letter to herself. Immediately, her identity is destabilized as she splits into “herself as the autobiographer and the subject of her autobiography." The splintering of her identity makes it become something that she can perform, making Charke both the playwright and the starring actress of her own story.

The theme of performance also ties back into Charke's gender identity and expression as she navigates societal expectations and challenges traditional gender norms through her various roles on and off the stage. Because of the shift in gender perceptions of the eighteenth century, a theatrical performance by an actor was closely associated to the true character of the person playing the role; instead of an actor embodying a role only for the stage, the audience's perception of such character performance became recognized as the identity of the performer themselves. Charke toyed with this idea as she “flits between the many different positions of identity that she takes on both onstage and off... Charlotte never really lets the reader know when her performance as a ‘man’ has stopped and when that of a ‘woman’ has begun." Through her performance of gender, she twists the norms of the time and manages to exist in a space between the binary of male and female. Charke also performs gender throughout her life through her cross-dressing and varying jobs. Some scholars argue that “as [Charke] flits between the many different positions of identity that she takes on both onstage and off Charlotte never really lets the reader know when her performance as a ‘man’ has stopped and when that of a ‘woman’ has begun." However, through her use of clothing, wigs, and objects, Charke reveals the seams of her performance of different genders. By bringing attention to such material objects, Charke “invites the audience... to take part in active reading and interpretation—and to pay attention to her performance." By performing gender, Charke is able to exist between the binary of male and female. As Higa argues, “[Charke’s] gender performances are neither definitively male nor definitively female, and we cannot argue that she moves back and forth between polarities if she is constantly residing between or beyond them."

=== Comedy ===
Throughout Charke’s narrative there is a continuous theme of humor and comedy. She begins the narrative by dedicating the author’s statement to herself, then proceeds to exaggerate and poke fun at her own writing ability, “Tho’ flattery is universally known to be the Spring from which Dedications frequently flow, I hope I shall escape that Odium so justly thrown on poetical Petitioners, notwithstanding my Attempt to illustrate those wonderful qualifications by which you have so eminently distinguished yourself, and gives you claim to the title of a non-pareil of the age” and “I am certain, there is no one in the World more fit than myself to be laughed at." Charke’s sense of humor is maintained throughout the entire piece as she weaves and incorporates it throughout both her melancholy and joyous moments of her life. However, critics of her time often overlooked this comedic theme, considering Charke’s humor to be a miserable yearning to appease her father and an attempt to enter into his good graces once again. Other critics, such as Sue Churchill, argue Charke’s clear use of comedy defies her supposed misery. She states that though Charke lived an obviously turbulent lifestyle, Charke continually undercut her sadness with laughter. For example, when Charke dresses in her father’s clothes as a child, rather than enjoying the clothes just for herself, she ventures out into the crowd, choosing to entertain the masses rather than to shy away from attention. She delights in the joy and laughter of the crowd, only becoming upset when she is removed from their watch. Churchill suggests that previous critics miss the jokes Charke wrote, and did not understand the knowledge and interpretations Charke exhibits both on literary form and the theater culture of the time.
