= Charke =

Charke is a surname. Notable people with the surname include:

- Charlotte Charke, (1713–1760), English actress
- Derek Charke (born 1974), Canadian classical composer and flutist
- Richard Charke (c. 1709–c. 1738), English violinist, composer, operatic baritone, and playwright
