= Richard III (1699 play) =

Play by Colley Cibber

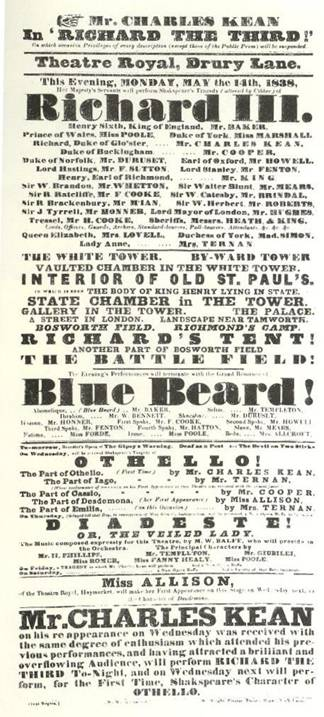
Pamphlet promoting the performance of Richard III at Drury Lane Theatre on 14 May 1838.

The Tragical History of King Richard III, Alter'd From Shakespeare (1699) is a history play written by Colley Cibber. It is based on William Shakespeare's Richard III, but reworked for Williamite audiences.

Cibber, a prominent theatre manager, first attempted to stage his version in 1699, but the performance was a disaster. The Master of the Revels censored the entire first act and the production was a popular and commercial failure. Cibber published the script in 1700, including the problematic act, with a short note on its suppression. Ensuing performances from 1704 eventually risked the entire play in Cibber's new form. The play became a success with leading actors such as David Garrick playing Richard III.

== Plot summary ==
The play opens in the reign of King Edward IV before it represents the reign of King Richard III during the Wars of the Roses. The end of the play reflects the accession to the throne of the Earl of Richmond, descendant of the Tudor family and future King Henry VII.

Shakespeare's play summarises events around the year 1485, although the actual historical events of the play proceeded over a much longer period. In Cibber's version the years 1471–1485, during which Richard gained power and was able to rise to the throne of England, are presented to the audience in five acts. The main events take place in London, mostly in the Tower, and in the camp and battlefield at Bosworth Field. The play does not reflect the time frame in an obvious manner: it's not clear which actions take place at what specific time or how much time actually passes during the play.

Shakespeare's first act begins with Richard secretly aspiring to the throne—during which process he decides to kill anyone he has to become king. In order to gain the throne he tricks Lady Anne into marrying him, even though she knows he murdered her first husband and her father-in-law.

The reigning king (King Edward IV) dies, passing the throne to his eldest son (King Edward V). The third act sees Richard, then the Duke of Gloucester, left in charge until Edward comes of age. Richard has powerful kinsmen of Edward's wife, the Queen consort Elizabeth Woodville, arrested and executed, which leaves the two young princes unprotected. In the fourth act, Richard has his political allies, particularly his right-hand man, Lord Buckingham, campaign to have himself crowned king. Richard then imprisons the young princes in the Tower and sends hired killers to murder both children. Rumours spread that a challenger to the throne is gathering forces in France.

While Richard still tries to consolidate his power, his fellows are ready to welcome a new ruler. Richard has his wife Anne murdered, so that he can marry young Elizabeth, the daughter of the former Queen Elizabeth and the dead King Edward. Richmond and Richard finally meet in battle at Bosworth Field. The night before the fight Richard is haunted by ghosts of all the people he has killed. In the battle on the following morning, Richard is killed, and Richmond is crowned King Henry VII, which concludes the fifth act.

== Cibber's changes ==
Even though Cibber takes fewer than 800 lines from Shakespeare, he stays for the most part with the original design, mainly adapting the plot to make it more suitable for the Orange stage, as well as performable in less than two hours. Cibber adds aspects and scenes and extends the plot, and leaves out several Shakespearean characters and passages.

Cibber contrives a completely new opening act, including the murder of King Henry VI taken from Henry VI, Part 3; that is not in Shakespeare's version. However, parts from the original first act are mentioned in the course of the play. One example is the conversation between Lady Anne and Richard in the second act, after the death of King Henry VI, in St. Paul's Cathedral. Another is Tressel's lines, "Your Queen yet Lives, and many of your Friends, / But for my Lord your Son---", dealing with the report to King Henry VI of his son's death, are also taken from Henry VI, Part 3. There is a new scene between Lady Ann and Richard, after marriage, during which they have an argument; and seven newly designed soliloquies for Richard III. (Note: The new soliloquies were created for Samuel Sandford, but as Sandford was not part of Drury Lane actors' repertory, he was not able to perform the role of Richard, and Cibber himself played the part in the first performance.)

The character of Queen Margaret is ignored completely. In the original she appears in I.iii and in IV.iv.

Both versions include the appearance of the ghosts of the murdered King Henry, Lady Ann, and the two princes. However, Cibber reduces the interplay between the dead and still living characters by allowing the ghosts to appear only before Richard and not Richmond. With only Richard seeing the ghosts, the King is referred to as being a little wicked. Unlike Shakespeare's version, the ghosts of Rivers, Grey, Vaughan, Hastings—servants to the Queen—and Richard's brother George Plantagenet, Duke of Clarence, do not emerge on stage.

While Shakespeare keeps violent scenes mainly off stage, Cibber includes more violent action, giving a more brutal picture of Richard as well as a more dramatic performance. Shakespeare never brings the two Princes in the Tower back to the stage after they have been guided to the Tower of London. He points out Richard's intent to kill his nephews by having the Duke talk to Sir James Tyrrell about the murders. Tyrrell is willing to kill the princes and leaves the stage. He reappears after the deed is done and gives an account of the deaths. The actual murder is not referred to and Tyrrell only mentions that he has seen the dead bodies. Cibber shows the murder. The Duke orders Tyrrell to make sure that Edward and Clarence are killed. A scene in the Tower shows the two princes scared to death in their chamber awaiting their fate. Tyrrell assigned Dighton and Forest to fulfil the killing and the two are shown entering the room of the princes. Even though they hesitate, they still murder both with daggers. Tyrrell makes sure that everything goes well and the dead bodies are thrown into the river Thames on Richard's demand. Cibber shows the tyrannical personality of King Richard, whereas Shakespeare does not present bloody deeds on stage.

== Censorship ==
The adaptation started with a scandal. The entire first act of the play was censored and consequently not performed on stage. However, this censorship only applied to events presented on stage and not to the written text. The script of Richard III was printed in full and included all censored lines and words. The depiction on stage was thought to create parallels to actual life in England. The audience might become too deeply involved in the action due to the contemporary costumes which made scenes look like real life. Furthermore, the depiction of brutality might bewilder the audience. Another reason for the censorship lies in the fear that the rewritten first act might show parallels to James II and might create sympathy for him. The political fear behind this accusation is very clear, but the idea that Cibber used the play to strengthen Jacobite ideas is far-fetched.

In An Apology for the Life of Colley Cibber, Cibber wrote regarding censorship:

But the Master of the Revels, who then licensed all plays for the Stage, assisted this reformation with a more zealous severity than ever. He would strike out whole scenes of a vicious or immoral character, though it were visibly shewn to be reformed, or punished; a severe instance of this kind falling upon my self, may be an excuse for my relating it: when Richard the Third (as I altered it from Shakespeare) came from his hands to the Stage, he expunged the whole first act, without sparing a line of it. This extraordinary stroke of a Sic volo occasioned my applying to him for the small indulgence of a speech or two, that the other four acts might limp on, with a little less absurdity! No! he had no leisure to consider what might be separately inoffensive.

The audience did not protest the methods of the Master of Revels. Audiences were used to accept that someone would decide on what they were allowed to see and what would better remain in the dark. The plot which was allowed to be staged may have been cut short by the Master of Revels, but the playwrights were at least able to publish their work in writing.

The prohibition to stage the play entirely caused its commercial failure, as well as a financial disaster for Drury Lane Theatre in the first years after the premier. However, the adaptation did not suffer of being a failure for too long: only about a decade later the play became a tremendous success.

== Reception ==
The date of the first performance is not known, but the dedication of the play (dated February 1699/1700) and the Term Catalogues and advertisements, which all appeared in February and March 1699/1700, show that the latest possible month for the production would have been January 1700. As Lincoln's Inn Fields was performing 1 Henry IV in December 1699, it is very likely that Richard III was also performed in the last month of 1699 to offer an equivalent.

What is known for sure is that Cibber's play was first staged at Drury Lane. After the première the play was staged again in February and March 1700 before its performance was discontinued. Cibber's version was not staged again for the next four years. It made its first reappearance on the stage in 1704 and then had to wait for another six years before being taken back into the performance circuit in 1710. There was a large increase of the number of performances of this play from the year 1710. The popularity of the play is also reflected by the presence of the Prince and Princess at the performance on 27 January 1715 in Drury Lane Theatre. The adaptation therefore did not suffer of being a failure for too long: only a few years later the play became a huge success, which it remained for nearly two hundred years up to the nineteenth century. This is also reflected in the editions of the play published in the eighteenth century. After 1731 the play was frequently reprinted and published, reflecting a significant demand. In 1714–1749 it was performed at least 170 times in different theatres. The quantity of performances rose even further after 1749. According to Frances M. Kavenik, who concentrated on collecting information on Restoration Drama, Richard III was staged 241 times in 1747–1779.

Most performances were based on Cibber's adaptation, but in the 18th century, some directors tried to return to the original version. Their attempts were greeted with an outcry from audiences. Macready attempted to reintroduce more of the original text into the play in 1821 but was unsuccessful. The disappointment of the audience forced him to return to Cibber's more familiar version of the play. Twenty-three years later, Samuel Phelps launched a similar attempt at Sadler's Well, but was equally unsuccessful. The public's opinion did not change until as late as the turn of the eighteenth century, and even then Samuel French called Cibber's version of the play the "acting version" of the plot.

That Cibber's adaptation was performed on stages up to the latter half of the nineteenth century underlines this. In the later part of the century a gradual shift back to the original Shakespearean version took place, probably due to audiences' increasing interest in original texts. From this point on Cibber's adaptation vanished from the stages.

It took two centuries to change critical and popular opinion and to make a staging of the original script possible again. The once discredited original now rules the stage unchallenged. Cibber's version, which was the most oft-produced "Shakespeare" play in nineteenth century America, cannot be found on stage any longer. Some directors thought it a good idea to preserve some of Cibber's most famous lines, such as "Off with his head! So much for Buckingham.", which fit well in the original version.

== Famous actors ==
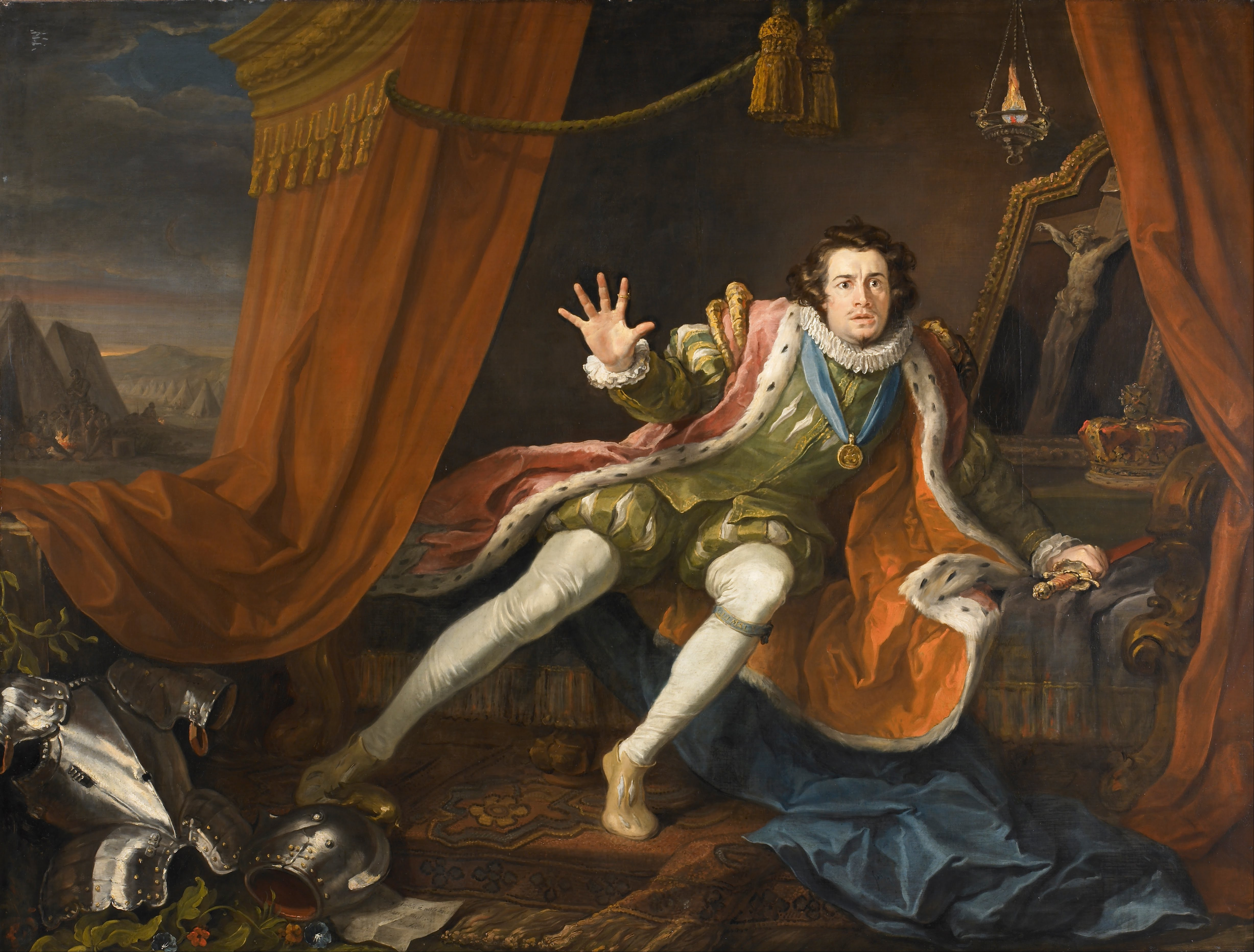
David Garrick as Richard III, oil on canvas by William Hogarth (1745). The painting depicts a scene from Colley Cibber's adaptation of the William Shakespeare play. The king has just awakened from a nightmare. The painting was made in 1745, but based on Garrick's appearance in 1743.

Around the middle of the eighteenth century, David Garrick began to establish himself at the London stages, and eventually became one of the most widely known actors for the role of Richard III. In 1745, William Hogarth, generally considered the most influential painter of his generation, painted Garrick in his role as Richard III. The role became the one Garrick was most famous for, and the painting one of the best known images of the 18th-century theatrical world.

The painting shows Richard III in the tent scene, in which he is haunted by the ghosts of people he has killed on his path to the throne. The night before the decisive battle at Bosworth Field is presented on stage in a luxurious tent in which Richard tries to find some peace and quiet. Instead of resting he is haunted and not even his comfortable bed can change the situation. He cries out:

Give me another horse! bind up my wounds!
Have mercy, Heaven! Ha!--- Soft!---'T was but a dream.
But then so terrible it shakes my Soul!

(Act V, Scene 2)

The painting has had a significant impact on history painting ever since its creation.

Hogarth painted the picture in commission for Mr. Duncombe of Duncombe Park who paid the then immense sum of £200 for the work. This scene has become one of the most famous 18th-century dramatic images. In the same way that Garrick's performance marked an important step in the eighteenth-century revival of Shakespeare, so Hogarth's work represents a crucial development in the evolution of history painting during the period. Hogarth's portrayal, which draws on Charles Le Brun's celebrated version of Family of Darius before Alexander the Great, shows the halting steps by both actors and artists to achieve an historically exact rendering of the past. Though such an accessory as armour, specially loaned from the Tower of London, is included in the left foreground, and Garrick is shown without his wig, his vaguely Elizabethan costume points to the relatively approximate sense of period which still dominated the British stage. Famed for his naturalistic acting style, Garrick is displayed frozen with fear in a pose familiar from pictorial manuals on gesture and expression, a source widely used by Georgian actors to achieve appropriate dramatic effect. Midway between a theatrical portrait and an historical rendering of an episode from the nation's past, Hogarth's work offers insight into 18th-century stagecraft. At the same time, it represents an important episode in the pictorial reconstruction of British history which so preoccupied both Hogarth's contemporaries and his successors.

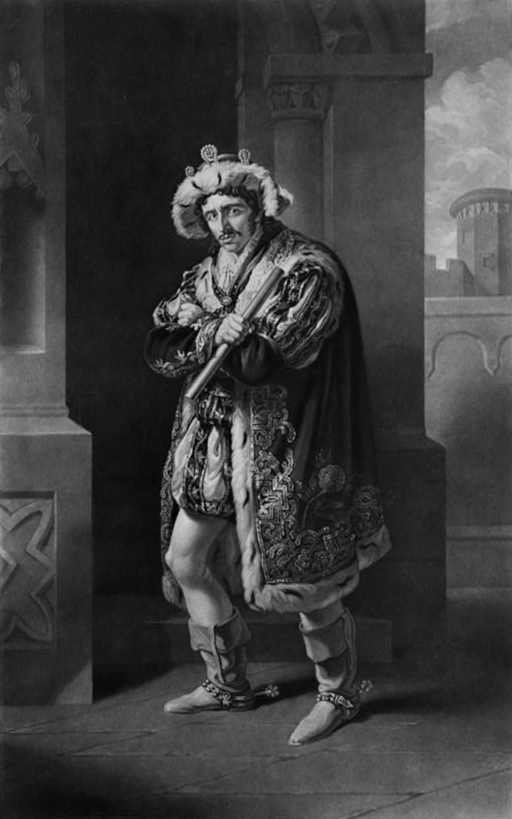
Edmund Kean (1787-1833) as Richard III. Engraving by Charles Turner (1774-1857) after John James Halls (1776-1834). "Mr. Kean in Richard the Third Act IV Scene 4". Mezzotint.

Edmund Kean (1787–1833) was also celebrated for the role of Richard III. A frenetic and lively manner characterised Kean's style of performance, but his tendency to drink too much before coming to work caused rumour and criticism. Nevertheless, the audience adored him for creating entertaining theatre. He mostly played villains such as Richard III. Moreover, Kean performed this role outside Britain. On 29 November 1820 he played Richard III in New York.

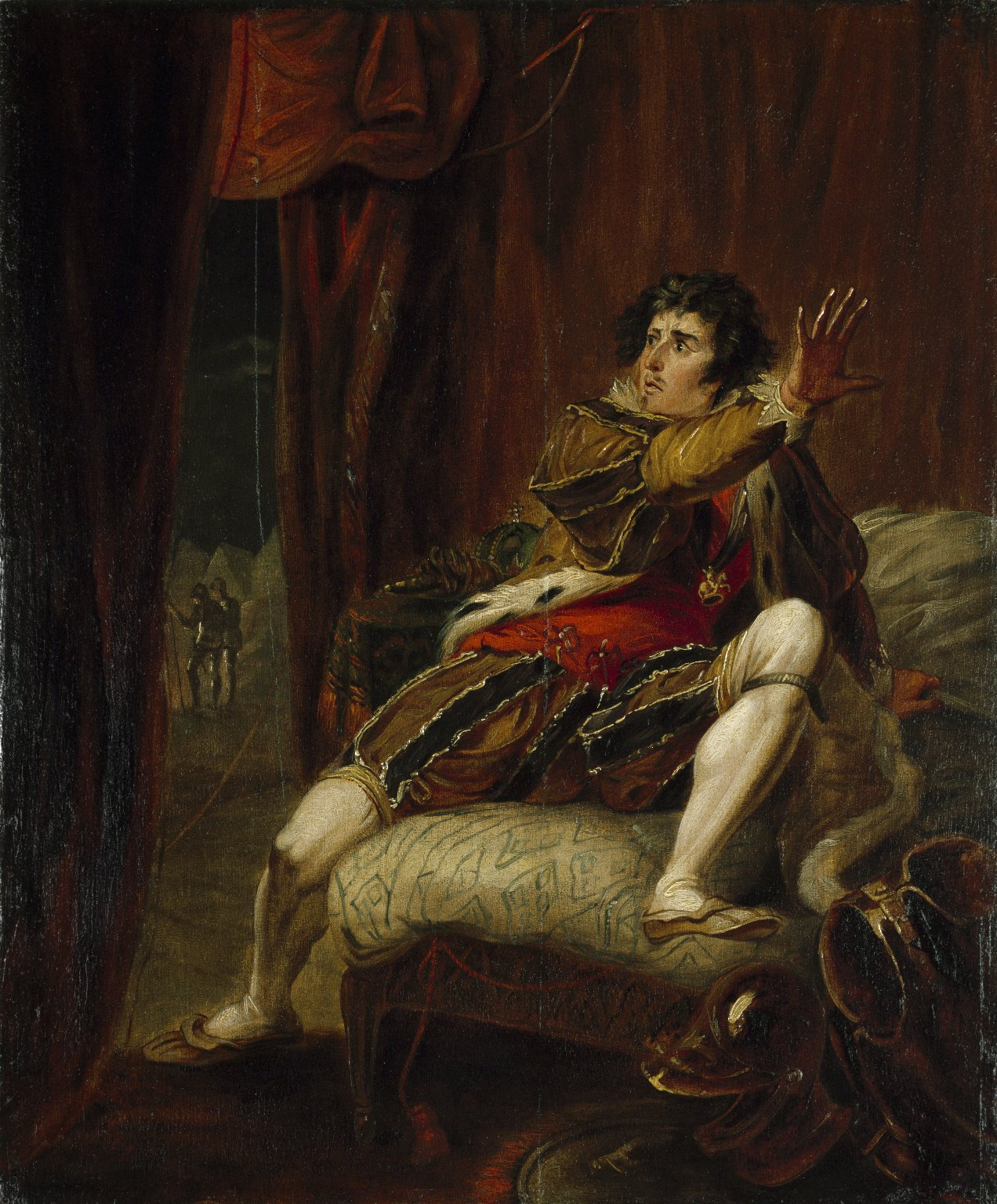
John Philip Kemble as Richard III, from Act V, Scene 3 of William Shakespeare's Richard III.

John Philip Kemble (1757–1823) played a large number of Shakespearian characters. Before he began to establish himself on the London stages he earned his living on the roads as a strolling actor, similar to the life his parents had led. In Hull he appeared for the first time as Macbeth on 30 September 1783. The picture above shows him in the role of Richard III. In contradiction to David Garrick, Kemble's style was a return to a rather motionless performance. Kemble dominated the London stage for three decades both as an actor and a manager.

== Printing history ==
(Source: English Short Title Catalogue http://www.rlg.org/index.php, 27 November 2006)
Year	Location	Imprint
1700	London	printed for B. Lintott at the Middle Temple-Gate, in Eleet-street [sic], and A. Bettesworth at the Red-Lyon on London-Bridge 1700
1718	London	printed for W. Mears, and J. Browne, and W. Chetwood, 1718
1731	Dublin	printed by A. Rhames, for R. Gunne, 1731
1734	London	printed for W. Feales; R. Wellington; J. Wellington; and A. Bettesworth and F. Clay, in trust for B. Wellington, 1734
1735?	Dublin	printed by M. Rhames; for R. Gunne, 1735?
1735	London	printed for W. Feales; and the book-sellers of London and Westminster, 1735
1736	London	printed for J. Tonson, and J. Watts, and sold by W. Feales, 1736
1736	London	printed for W. Feales, R. Wellington, J. Wellington; and A. Bettesworth, and F. Clay, in trust for B. Wellington, 1736
1745	London	printed for J. and R. Tonson and S. Draper, and J. Watts, 1745
1750	Dublin	printed for James Dalton, 1750
1751	London	printed for J. and R. Tonson, and J. Watts, 1751
1753	London	printed for J. and R. Tonson, and J. Watts, 1753
1753	Dublin	printed for James [D]alton, 1753
1754	[London?]	Printed in the year, 1754
1755?	Dublin	printed for Thomas Wilkinson, 1755?
1756	Dublin	printed for Brice Edmond, 1756
1756	Dublin	printed for William Williamson, 1756
1756	London	printed for W. Feales, and the booksellers of London and Westminster, 1756
1757	London	printed for the proprietors, and sold by the booksellers in town and country, 1757
1757	London	printed for J. and R. Tonson, 1757
1757	London	printed for J. and R. Tonson, 1757
1762	Dublin	printed by Cusack Greene, 1762
1766	Edinburgh	printed in the year, 1766
1766	London	printed for J. and R. Tonson, 1766
1769	London	printed for the proprietors, and sold by the booksellers in town and country, 1769
1769	London	printed for T. Lowndes, T. Caslon, W. Nicoll, and S. Bladon, 1769
1774	London	printed for T. Lowndes, T. Caslon, W. Nicoll, and S. Bladon, 1774
1775	London	printed and sold by W. Oxlade, 1775
1784	London	printed for T. and W. Lowndes, W. Nicoll, and S. Bladon, 1784
1785?	London	printed by H. Whitworth, 1785?
1787	London	printed for the proprietors, and sold by Rachael Randall; and all booksellers in England, Scotland and Ireland, 1787
1790	Dublin	printed for P. Wogan, 1790
1793	London	printed for W. Lowndes and S. Bladon, 1793

== Performance history ==
(Source: The London Stage 1660–1800, part 2, 1700–1729)
Date	Theatre	Comment
4 April 1704	Drury Lane	At the Desire of several Persons of Quality. Mainpiece: With the Famous Battle of Bosworth Field, between him and the Earl of Richmond, afterwards King Henry the Seventh. Written Originally by Shakespear, who in the true and lively Character of Richard has shewn his most Masterly Strokes of Nature.
31 March 1705	Drury Lane	At this date Aesop was performed. But in the Daily Courant of 30 March 1705 Richard III had been announced.
28 January 1710	Queen's	At the Desire of several Persons of Quality.
27 March 1710	Queen's	Benefit Mrs Porter. At the Desire of several Ladies of Quality.
13 May 1710	Queen's	Containing Distresses and Death of King Henry the Sixth, the Murther of young King Deuard the Fifth and his Brother in the Tower, with the Landing of the Earl of Richmond, and the Memorable and Decisive Battle in Bosworth Field.
14 February 1713	Drury Lane	
26 February 1713	Drury Lane	
27 April 1713	Drury Lane	Benefit Mrs Bicknell
1 February 1714	Drury Lane	
27 February 1714	Drury Lane	
27 April 1714	Drury Lane	
15 October 1714	Drury Lane	
27 January 1715	Drury Lane	By His Royal Highness's Command (Prince and Princess present)
6 December 1715	Drury Lane	
1 January 1717	Drury Lane / Lincoln Inn Fields	

== Sources ==
- Cibber, Colley (1756) [first published 1740]. An apology for the life of Colley Cibber, comedian, and late patentee of the Theatre-Royal. With an historical view of the stage during his own time. Written by himself (4th ed.). London: R. and J. Dodsley. hdl:2027/njp.32101067567899. OL 23416731M.
- Clark, Sandra (2013). "Shakespeare and Other Adaptations". In Owen, Susan J. (ed.). A Companion to Restoration Drama. Oxford: Blackwell Publishing. pp. 274–290. doi:10.1002/9781118663400.ch16. ISBN 9781118663400.
- Hughes, Derek (1996). English Drama 1660–1700. Oxford: Clarendon Press. doi:10.1093/acprof:oso/9780198119746.001.0001. ISBN 9780198119746 – via Oxford Scholarship Online.
- Hughes, Derek (2006). "Restoration and settlement". In Fisk, Deborah Payne (ed.). The Cambridge Companion to English Restoration Theatre. Cambridge Companions to Literature. Cambridge: Cambridge University Press. pp. 127–141. doi:10.1017/CCOL0521582156.008. ISBN 9780511999369 – via Cambridge Core.
- Hume, Robert D. (1983). The Rakish Stage: Studies in English Drama, 1660–1800. Carbondale and Edwardsville: Southern Illinois University Press. ISBN 9780809311002.
- Kalson, Albert E. (1963). "The Chronicles in Cibber's Richard III". SEL: Studies in English Literature 1500–1900. 3 (2, Elizabethan and Jacobean Drama). Rice University: 253–267. doi:10.2307/449298. eISSN 1522-9270. ISSN 0039-3657. JSTOR 449298.
- Kavenik, Frances M. (1995). British drama, 1660-1779: a critical history. Twayne's critical history of British drama. Twayne Publishers. ISBN 9780805745337.
- McWilliam, Neil (n.d.). "Welcome to William Hogarth's Realm". William Hogarth's Realm.
- Theatre Museum (7 October 2007). "Edmund Kean as Richard III". PeoplePlay UK: Theatre History Online.
- Theatre Museum (10 October 2007). "John Philip Kemble". PeoplePlay UK: Theatre History Online.
