= The Refusal (play) =

1721 play

- Original language: English
- Written by: Colley Cibber
- Genre: Comedy

Premiere
- Date: 14 February 1721
- Place: Theatre Royal, Drury Lane

The Refusal, Or, The Ladies Philosophy is a 1721 comedy play by the British writer Colley Cibber. It is a reworking of the 1672 farce Les Femmes Savantes by Molière, with reference to the recent South Sea Bubble.

The original Drury Lane Theatre cast included Cibber himself as Witling, William Penkethman as Sir Gilbert Wangle, Barton Booth as Granger, Robert Wilks as Frankly, Margaret Bicknell as Lady Wrangle, Anne Oldfield as Sophronia and Hester Santlow as Charlotte.

To counter Cibber's production, John Rich manager at the rival Lincoln's Inn Fields Theatre put on a revival of another English-language version of Molière's play The Female Virtuosos by Thomas Wright. Added problems for Cibber came on the first night of the production when political opponents of his (most probably over his association with the Whig leader Robert Walpole) began heckling and drowning out the performance. The play managed to last for six performances in total, a respectable amount for a comedy during the period. It was not performed again in Cibber's lifetime, but then became a standard part of the repertory until the end of the eighteenth century.

== Plot ==
Two young woman both have men they wish to marry, but their father has given first refusal to a fop. Together they try and work their way around the obstacle.

== Bibliography ==
- Burling, William J. A Checklist of New Plays and Entertainments on the London Stage, 1700–1737. Fairleigh Dickinson Univ Press, 1992.
- Koon, Helene. Colley Cibber: A Biography. University Press of Kentucky, 2014.
- Nicoll, Allardyce. History of English Drama, 1660–1900, Volume 2. Cambridge University Press, 2009.
