= Love in a Riddle =

1729 play

- Original language: English
- Written by: Colley Cibber
- Genre: Comedy

Premiere
- Date: 7 January 1729
- Place: Theatre Royal, Drury Lane

Love in a Riddle is a 1729 ballad opera by the British actor-manager Colley Cibber. It was part of a boom in ballad operas inspired by the enormous success of John Gay's The Beggar's Opera the previous year.

The original Drury Lane cast included John Mills as Arcas, John Harper as Aegon, Charles Williams as Amyntas, Sarah Thurmond as Iphis, Colley Cibber as Philautus, Benjamin Griffin as Corydon, James Oates as Mopsus, Joe Miller as Cimon, Jane Cibber as Ianthe and Kitty Clive as Phillida. The prologue was spoken by Robert Wilks.

== Bibliography ==
- Avery, Emmett Langdon . The London Stage, Volume II: A Calendar Of Plays, Entertainments And Afterpieces, Together With Casts, Box Receipts And Contemporary Comment. Southern Illinois University Press, 1960.
- Burling, William J. A Checklist of New Plays and Entertainments on the London Stage, 1700-1737. Fairleigh Dickinson Univ Press, 1992.
- Nicoll, Allardyce. A History of Early Eighteenth Century Drama: 1700-1750. CUP Archive, 1927.
