= The Rival Fools =

1709 play

- Original language: English
- Written by: Colley Cibber
- Genre: Comedy

Premiere
- Date: 11 January 1709
- Place: Theatre Royal, Drury Lane

The Rival Fools is a 1709 comedy play by the British writer Colley Cibber. It drew inspiration from the earlier play Wit at Several Weapons. Despite Cibber's previous record of turning out hits, it was not a great success.

The original Drury Lane cast featured William Pinkethman as Sir Oliver Outwit, Robert Wilks as Young Outwit, Barton Booth as Cunningham, William Bullock as Sir Gregory Goose, Colley Cibber as Samuel Simpson, George Pack as Sir Threadbare, Theophilus Keene as Priscian, Anne Oldfield as Lucinda, Mary Porter as Mirabel and Elizabeth Willis as Governess.

== Bibliography ==
- Burling, William J. A Checklist of New Plays and Entertainments on the London Stage, 1700-1737. Fairleigh Dickinson Univ Press, 1992.
- Koon, Helene. Colley Cibber: A Biography. University Press of Kentucky, 2014.
- McGirr, Elaine M. Partial Histories: A Reappraisal of Colley Cibber. Springer, 2016.
- Nicoll, Allardyce. History of English Drama, 1660-1900, Volume 2. Cambridge University Press, 2009.
- Van Lennep, W. The London Stage, 1660-1800: Volume Two, 1700-1729. Southern Illinois University Press, 1960.
