= Catherine Cibber =

British singer and actor (1669–1734)

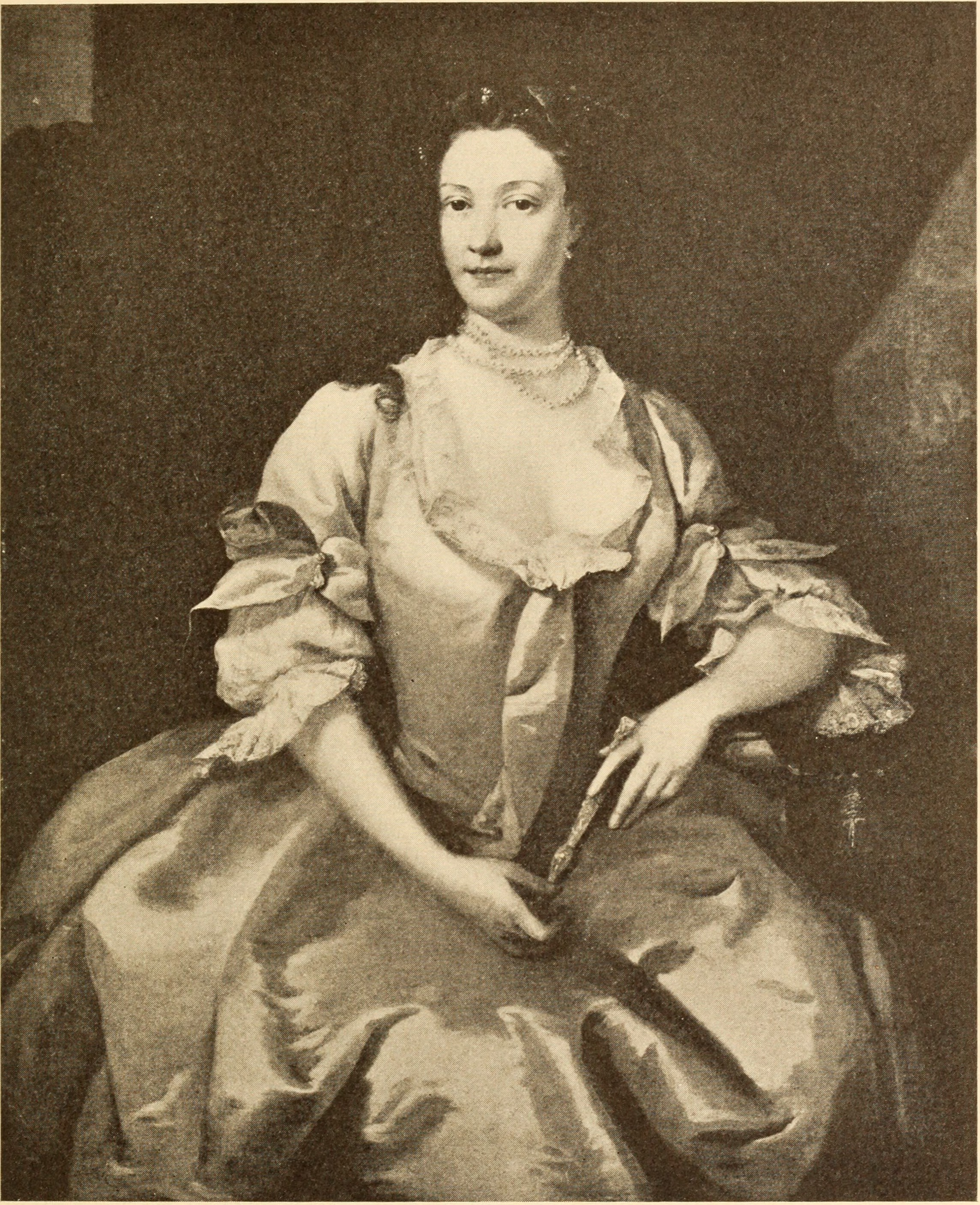
- Portrait from the Ehrich Galleries collection
- Born: Katherine Shore; 1669; London
- Died: 17 January 1734 (aged 64–65); Knightsbridge
- Other name: Mrs Colley Cibber
- Occupations: singer and actor
- Known for: acting
- Spouse: Colley Cibber
- Children: 12, including Theophilus Cibber and Charlotte Charke

Catherine Cibber, born Katherine Shore (baptised 1669 – 17 January 1734), was a British soprano and actress. She was called Mrs Colley Cibber and the "greatest English actress of her time".

== Life ==
Cibber was born in London and baptised in 1669. Her mother was Ann Shore and her father, Matthias and eventually two of her brothers (William and John) were sergeant-trumpeters to the King. Cibber was said to have been taught to sing and play the harpsichord by Henry Purcell.

On 6 May 1693 Cibber married the actor Colley Cibber despite his poor prospects and insecure, socially inferior job.

She was painted by leading portrait painter Thomas Hudson as "Mrs Colley Cibber", with red lips, brown eyes, mauve hair ribbons, a greenish gray satin dress and surrounded by red cushions and drapes. She was called the "greatest English actress of her time".

Cibber and Katherine had twelve children between 1694 and 1713. Theophilus Cibber was born during the Great Storm of 1703. Six died in infancy; Catherine, the eldest surviving daughter, married Colonel James Brown and seems to have been the dutiful one who looked after her father in his old age following his wife's death in 1734. She was duly rewarded at his death with most of his estate. His middle daughters, Anne and Elizabeth, went into business. Anne had a shop that sold fine wares and foods, and married John Boultby. Elizabeth had a restaurant near Gray's Inn, and married firstly Dawson Brett, and secondly (after Brett's death) Joseph Marples. His only son to reach adulthood, Theophilus, became an actor at Drury Lane Theatre at the age of 16 in 1721. Theophilus became an embarrassment because of his scandalous life. Their other son to survive infancy, James, died in or after 1717 before reaching adulthood. Colley's youngest daughter Charlotte followed in her father's theatrical footsteps, but she fell out with him and her sister Catherine, and she was cut off by the family.

Cibber died in Knightsbridge in 1734 of asthma and she was buried three days later at St Martin-in-the-Fields.
