= The Non-Juror =

1717 play

- Original language: English
- Written by: Colley Cibber
- Genre: Comedy

Premiere
- Date: 6 December 1717
- Place: Theatre Royal, Drury Lane

The Non-Juror is a 1717 comedy play by the British writer Colley Cibber. It is inspired by Molière's 1664 work Tartuffe.

The original Drury Lane Theatre cast featured John Mills as Sir John Woodvil, Barton Booth as Colonel Woodvil, Robert Wilks as Hearty, Cibber himself as Doctor Wolf, Thomas Walker as Charles, Mary Porter as Lady Woodvil and Anne Oldfield as Maria.

Produced three years after the Hanoverian Succession and two after the outbreak of the 1715 Rebellion, the play was sharply critical of Jacobites and their Tory allies. It mockingly exaggerated the position of those who refused to swear allegiance to George I. Cibber himself played the title role of Doctor Wolf, a nonjuring Church of England clergyman who claims that "a Protestant Church can never be secure, till it has a Popish Prince to defend it".

The play was a hit, and George I himself commended Cibber with a reward of two hundred pounds. The anti-Catholic tone of the work offended Alexander Pope, himself a nonjuring Catholic, who lamented "the great success of so damn'd a play". It contributed to the growing rivalry between the two writers. The prologue by Nicholas Rowe contained jibes against Catholics currently buying up property in Urbino, the Italian residence of the Jacobite pretender James III. When it was published in 1718, Cibber dedicated the play to King George.

In 1768 a rewritten version The Hypocrite by Isaac Bickerstaffe appeared at Drury Lane. This removed many of the political caricatures of Cibber's play which had by now lost their relevance in the changed context, and the principal character was changed to be a Methodist.

== Bibliography ==
- Nicoll, Allardyce. History of English Drama, 1660-1900, Volume 2. Cambridge University Press, 2009.
- Baines, Paul & Ferarro, Julian & Rogers, Pat. The Wiley-Blackwell Encyclopedia of Eighteenth-Century Writers and Writing, 1660-1789. Wiley-Blackwell, 2011.
- Burling, William J. A Checklist of New Plays and Entertainments on the London Stage, 1700-1737. Fairleigh Dickinson Univ Press, 1992.
- Koon, Helene. Colley Cibber: A Biography. University Press of Kentucky, 2014.
- Rosslyn, Felicity. Alexander Pope: A Literary Life. Springer, 2016.
- Streete, Adrian. Apocalypse and Anti-Catholicism in Seventeenth-Century English Drama. Cambridge University Press, 2017.
