= Wit at Several Weapons =

Comedy of uncertain date and authorship

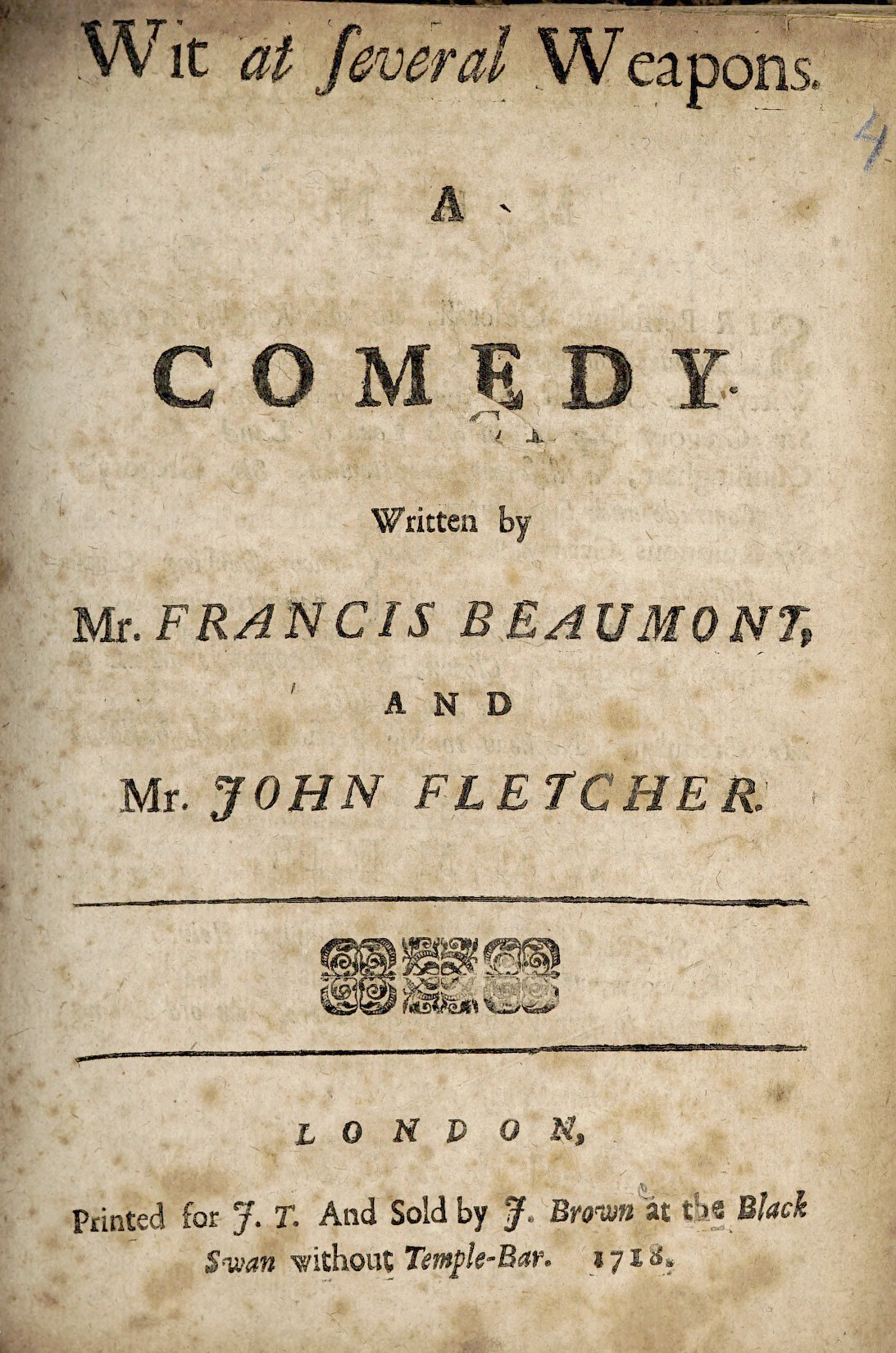
Title page of the 1718 edition of Wit at Several Weapons

Wit at Several Weapons is a seventeenth-century comedy of uncertain date and authorship.

== Authorship and date ==
Wit at Several Weapons was first printed in the two Beaumont and Fletcher folios of 1647 and 1679, and was entered into the Stationers' Register on 29 June 1660, where it is also attributed to Beaumont and Fletcher. In its present form, however, it is usually considered by modern scholars to be a collaboration between Thomas Middleton and William Rowley. The Epilogue to the play in the folios refers to Fletcher's limited role in its authorship ("if he but writ / An act, or two"), although the text itself suggests that Fletcher's contribution may have been even less than that, since his highly characteristic pattern of linguistic preferences (ye for you, 'em for them, etc.) is lacking in the play. David Lake confirms the presence of Middleton and Rowley that earlier scholars like Cyrus Hoy had detected. Where other critics had dated the play anywhere from 1609 to 1620, Lake favors a date in the later part of 1613 based on topical allusions.

Lake's analysis of the play's internal evidence yielded the following division of shares of authorship:

Middleton – Act I, scene 1; Act II, 1; Act III; Act IV;
Rowley – Act I, scene 2; Act II, 2–4; Act V.

The overall division is one typical of Middleton/Rowley collaborations, in which Middleton took primary responsibility for the main plot, and Rowley for the comic subplot. References in the text indicate that the clown character Pompey Doodle is a fat clown, a kind of part that Rowley repeatedly wrote for himself to play.

== Influence ==
No data on the drama's stage premiere or pre-1642 productions has survived. The play is thought to have influenced Sir William Davenant when he wrote his The Wits (published 1636), and John Dryden borrowed from it for his first play, The Wild Gallant (1663). Wit at Several Weapons was adapted and revived by Colley Cibber as The Rival Fools, acted and printed in 1709. Reportedly, it was not a success.

== Synopsis ==
Sir Perfidious Oldcraft is a self-described practitioner and admirer of "wit". (In the English Renaissance, the word covered everything from prodigious intellect to cleverness, street smarts to practical jokes.) He is so dedicated to the concept that when his son Wittypate Oldcraft turns twenty-one, Sir Perfidious kicks him out of the family manse with no income, to live by his wits. The son decides to fulfill his father's dictates with a vengeance, by making his father his wits' target.

The old knight is also the guardian of a Niece (otherwise unnamed, as is Middleton's recurrent practice in his plays). Sir Perfidious has arranged a marriage between his Niece and a local knight, Sir Gregory Fop. His name clues the audience that the intended bridegroom is a fool. Sir Gregory comes to meet his intended bride with a witty friend named Cunningham (the play text pronounces his name "cunning game"). As a practical joke – his idea of a witticism – Sir Perfidious lets his Niece believe that Cunningham is her future husband, before introducing her to the real Sir Gregory.

But the Niece and Cunningham instantly feel a powerful attraction to each other, much to the old knight's displeasure. The Niece is repelled by the idea of accepting Fop in Cunningham's place; but her uncle's threats to isolate her force her to conceal her real feelings and appear to comply – while ruthlessly berating, ridiculing, and manipulating Sir Gregory in private. She also flirts with Sir Gregory's clown, Pompey Doodle – so blatantly that Cunningham's jealousy is aroused, proving that he loves her. He then collaborates in her scheme. In the end, Fop's spirit is so beaten down that he marries a poor woman who treats him with respect and consideration, rather than the wealthy Niece who scorns and belittles him at every turn. This leaves the Niece free to marry the poor but desirable Cunningham.

Wittypate Oldcraft falls in with a group of cheats and con men: Sir Ruinous Gentry is a "decayed knight", and Priscian is a "poor scholar". The knight's wife, Lady Ruinous, is the fourth member of the crew. The quartet pursue an escalating series of cons against Sir Perfidious that deprive him of more than two hundred pounds of his cash. Cunningham joins and cooperates with the cheaters.

In the end, Sir Perfidious realizes that Wittypate has cheated him repeatedly. Conceding that his son has done an excellent job of living by his wits, the old knight gives Wittypate the yearly income of £200 that he'd requested in the first place.

== Characters ==
(Character descriptions derive from the 1679 folio.)

- Sir Perfidious Oldcraft, an old knight, a great admirer of wit.
- Wittypate Oldcraft, his father's own son.
- Sir Gregory Fop, a witless lord of land.
- Cunningame, a discreet gentleman, Sir Gregory's comrade and supplanter.
- Sir Ruinous Gentry, a decayed knight.
- Lady Ruinous, wife to Sir Ruinous.
- Priscian, a poor scholar.
- Pompey Doodle, a clown, Sir Gregory's man.
- Mr. Credulous, nephew to Sir Perfidious, a shallow-brained scholar.
- Boy, a singer.
- Servant to the Gentrys.
- Servant to Sir Perfidious Oldcraft.
- 2 Servants at a tavern.
- Niece to Sir Perfidious, a rich and witty heiress.
- Guardianess to Sir Perfidious's Niece, an old doting crone.
- Mirabell, the Guardianess's niece.
