= Charlotte Charke =

British actor and writer

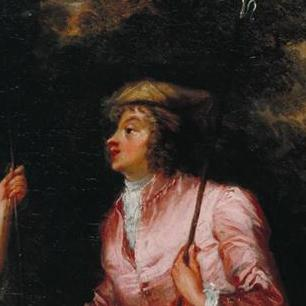
- Detail from "Damon and Phillida Reconciled: A Scene from Colley Cibber's 'Damon and Phillida'" in which Charke portrayed the character Damon. Painted by William Jones in 1740.
- Born: 13 January 1713; London, England, United Kingdom
- Died: 6 April 1760 (aged 47); London, England, United Kingdom
- Occupation: Actress
- Parents: Colley Cibber (father); Catherine Cibber (mother)
- Relatives: Caius Gabriel Cibber (grandfather); Theophilus Cibber (brother)

Charlotte Charke, née Cibber, also Charlotte Secheverell, aka Charles Brown (13 January 1713 - 6 April 1760) was an English actress, playwright, novelist, and autobiographer. She began acting at the age of seventeen in breeches roles, and took to wearing male clothing off stage as well, performing and being publicly known as "Charles Brown" from 1741. Her later career and her writings were conducted under her own name, "Mrs. Charlotte Charke", and identified her as the daughter of Colley Cibber. After being unsuccessful in a series of jobs associated with men at the time, such as valet, sausage maker, farmer, and tavern owner, she succeeded in her career as a writer and continued her work as a novelist and memoirist until her death in 1760.

== Early life ==
Charke was born on January 13, 1713, in London, England, the youngest of twelve children. Her father was actor, playwright, and poet laureate Colley Cibber, and her mother was musician and actress Katherine Shore. Most of her siblings passed away before the age of one, and Shore, who was forty-five when she gave birth to Charke, saw Charke as "an unwelcome guest to the family." Charke's siblings resented her when she was young and many remained distant from her for the rest of her life.

Like her brothers and sisters, she took an interest in the theatre, and often spent time at the Theatre Royal of Drury Lane, which her father managed.

Family members and friends say Charke began to show an "addiction" to manly activities at a young age. Since her father was often absent due to business endeavors and her mother was frequently sick, Charke became independent at a young age.

Between 1719 and 1721, she attended Mrs. Draper's School for Girls in Park Street, Westminster, where she studied the liberal arts, Latin, Italian, and geography. Following this, she lived with her mother in Middlesex and continued her studies at home – including dance under the "celebrated Mr. Grosconet." She described her education as a "genteel one", and she never took an interest in embroidery or table dressing, instead preferring to learn about science and language. She suggested that her identification with the male gender began early in her life, and recalled impersonating her father as a small child. When she moved in with her mother, she taught herself traditionally male activities such as shooting, gardening, and horse racing. In 1724, Charke and her mother moved to Hertfordshire, where she continued her pursuit of traditionally male subjects and hobbies. According to her anecdotes, she studied medicine there and, in 1726, at the age of 13, tried to establish herself as a doctor. She was not successful, and in 1729, she returned to London to live with her father.

== Early acting career ==
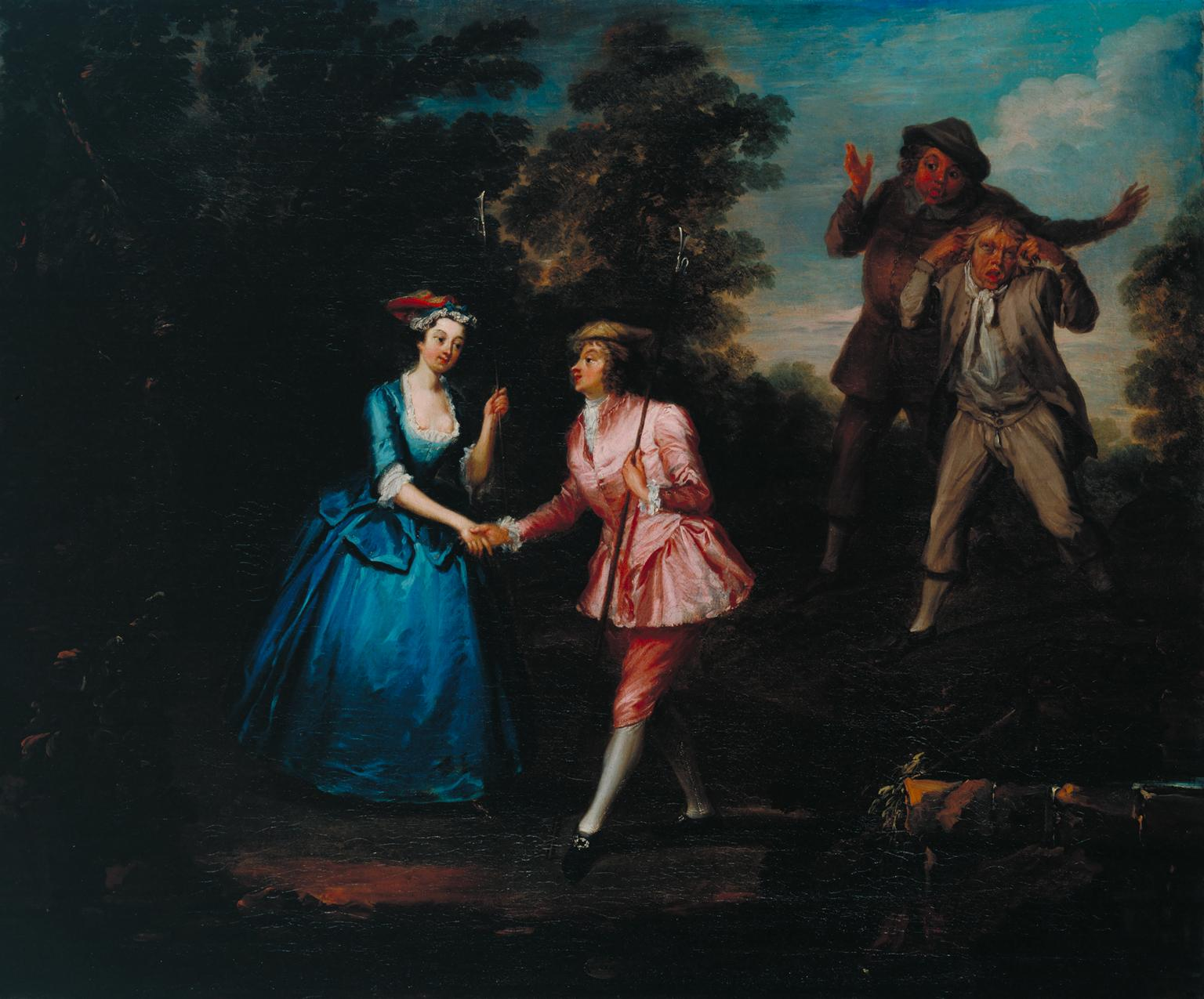
Charlotte Charke, in pink, plays Damon as a breeches role in her father Colley Cibber's pastoral farce Damon and Phillida.

Upon her return to London, she was courted by composer and violinist Richard Charke, and the two were married six months after meeting, on February 4, 1730. The marriage was short-lived, as Charke believed her husband had been motivated by his own poor finances and her father's wealthy status. Once married, Charke, no longer in the care of her parents, began to appear on stage.

In her memoirs, she speaks of her admiration for the "perfect" Mrs. Anne Oldfield, who encouraged her "hopes of success". On April 8, 1730, at the age of seventeen, Charke made her stage debut at Drury Lane in The Provok'd Wife, by John Vanbrugh, playing the stereotypically ultra-feminine minor role of Mademoiselle. However, she stopped performing after discovering she was pregnant. She gave birth to a daughter, Catherine (also known as Kitty), in December 1730. By June 1731, Charke returned to the stage as Lucy in The London Merchant by George Lillo. The following month, she made her first appearance in a breeches role as Tragedo in the same play, and followed that by Roderigo in Othello in 1732. Charke became interested in travesty roles, or male roles played by women. She would later appear as Mrs. Slammerkin in The Beggar's Opera and the tomboyish Hoyden in The Relapse. Around this time, Charke began intermittently wearing male clothing off the stage.

In 1733, Cibber sold his controlling interest in the Drury Lane Theatre to John Highmore, which upset Charke, who felt that it should have been passed on to her and her brother,Theophilus Cibber. It is likely that the sale was a scheme by Cibber to alleviate his debt by selling the interest at a vastly inflated price to make a profit. Theophilus, who likely knew of the scheme, used the opportunity of new leadership without his father to make greater demands of the theatre and organized an actors' revolt. The revolt led to the tumultuous leadership of Charles Fleetwood, and after several loyal years at Drury Lane, Charke was fired from the company for quarreling with Fleetwood and for boisterous behavior, which was also described as "private misconduct."

Despite her father's request to reinstate her position, Charke chose to pursue other endeavors. She was denied entry to many theatres once she left Drury Lane. In 1735, she created her own company, located at Lincoln's Inn Fields, where she wrote and performed her first play, The Art of Management. The play was a direct attack on Fleetwood, who attempted to buy up all printed copies of the play to prevent it circulating.

In 1736, she joined Henry Fielding's company at the Haymarket Theatre. There, she appeared as Lord Place, a parody of her father, in Fielding's Pasquin. The play was a powerful attack on Robert Walpole and his government. Colley Cibber was satirized for his attachment to Walpole and his undeserved status as poet laureate. In response to the play, Walpole led Parliament into passing the Licensing Act 1737, which closed all non-patent theatres and forbade the acting of any play that had not passed official censors. Charke's antagonistic relationship with both of London's government-recognized patent theatres meant that she would have great difficulty finding legitimate employment as an actress.

Charke had become estranged from her husband Richard, who had remained with the acting company at Drury Lane, upset by his costly gambling habits and frequent affairs. In 1737, he fled to Jamaica to escape his debts, and died shortly afterward, leaving Charke a widowed mother, with no income and a strained relationship with her powerful father. By this point, Charke frequently wore male clothes, even off-stage.

== Poverty, cross-dressing, and later acting career ==
In 1738, Charke was granted the uncommon privilege of a license to run Punch's Theatre at St. James's. It was a puppet theatre, and she used a cast of wooden dolls to perform several satirical plays. Many stringed figures were caricatured after current politicians and actors, including her father. Her puppet shows were popular, and fell outside the government's censorship laws, as no human actors appeared on stage. A national tour of her shows was planned, but canceled after Charke fell seriously ill. According to her autobiography, medical bills cost her the theatre, and she was forced to sell her puppets at a severe loss. She sent young Catherine off with begging notes to her friends and relatives, but no one in her family was willing or able to help her monetarily. Her father remained furious with her for the Drury Lane actors' revolt, as well as her unflattering impression of him in Pasquin, which had been conceived by his old enemy Fielding.

Charke received some financial support from fellow actors, and when she was eventually arrested and imprisoned for her debt, coffee-house keepers and prostitutes from Covent Garden banded together to pay her bail.

At this point, Charke almost exclusively appeared as male in public. In 1741, she joined Jockey Adams' touring company outside of London under the name Mr. Charles Brown. She passed so well as a man that she received romantic attention from an unnamed orphan heiress, speculated to be Mary Harlowe. After being invited to tea by the heiress, Charke ultimately revealed her true gender to the suitor, who was "absolutely struck speechless for some little Time." Unable to earn a living in the sanctioned theatres, Charke began to work any job she could to support herself and Catherine. She continued to work as a man and served as a sausage maker as well as a valet to Richard Annesley, the sixth Earl of Anglesey. Anglesey was famous as a bigamist and libertine and lived with a paramour during Charke's employ. Charke claimed that when Anglesey was not entertaining guests, the trio would dine together as friendly equals. As a valet's service would indeed be personal, usually including dressing one's master for the day, the entire arrangement would have been quite unusual. (Anglesey was soon a significant party to an infamous scandal after a court discovered he had sold James Annesley, with a strong claim to the inheritance, into slavery. He was dispossessed of his lands, but allowed to keep his title.)

In 1742, Charke joined a new acting company in the New Theatre in St. James's and produced her second play, Tit for Tat, or, Comedy and Tragedy at War. In the flush of early success, she borrowed money from her uncle and opened the Charlotte Charke Tavern in Drury Lane. This failed due to her customers' thieving and her generosity, and she ultimately sold it for a loss. That summer, she appeared in a series of male roles, and appeared as Charles Brown in public every day. She joined her brother, Theophilus, at the Haymarket in 1744, before joining William Hallam's company. She married John Sacheverell in 1746, though little is known about their relationship. They remained married until his passing.

Charke remained in severe poverty after the opening and closure of her theatre. She was offered the leading male role of Punch (of Punch & Judy fame) in a new puppet theatre, which was an artistic and financial success for Charke. The show was held by John Russell, who recognized her abilities as a comic performer and a proven manipulator of complex stringed marionettes. After one short season, the theatre's founder was arrested for debts and imprisoned in Newgate Prison, where he went mad and eventually died. Charke attempted to buy the theatre's puppets from Russell's landlord, but she could not meet his asking price, and the little company passed out of existence. Creditors also retained an unproduced script by Russell as collateral, preventing Charke from staging it as she had planned to do.

Sometime in 1747, Charke travelled the West Country with her daughter, performing as a strolling player. In 1750, Catherine married an actor named John Harman, despite her mother's aversion to him.

During these peripatetic years, Charke was once imprisoned alongside men as a vagabond actor, worked as a male pastry chef, and set herself up as a farmer. She also briefly ran a grocery store. Her work and business ventures often ended in failure. Between 1752 and 1753, she wrote for the Bristol Weekly Intelligencer, and in 1754, she worked as a prompter in Bath, under her own name but in men's clothing. She found many of the players difficult and untalented compared to those she had known in her privileged youth. At the end of the year, she moved back to London to make a living as a writer.

In 1758, Charke found herself alone again when her daughter, Catherine, and her husband moved to America. She attempted to return to the stage in 1759, in the breeches role of Marplot in Susanna Centlivre's The Busybody.

In April 1760, at the age of forty-seven, Charke fell ill with a "winter disease" and was never able to recover from it. She died later that year at her lodgings in Haymarket, London, with only the remembrance of being "the celebrated Mrs. Charlotte Charke, Daughter of the late Colley Cibber, Esq., Poet Laureat; a Gentlewoman remarkable for her Adventures and Misfortunes."

== Writing ==
The final chapter of Charke's life was defined by her writing, in which she saw a path to repairing her relationship with her father. In 1754, Charke wrote her first novel, The History of Mr. Henry Dumont, Esq; and Miss Charlotte Evelyn and sold it for only ten guineas. It was published in 1755, but sold poorly. However, Charke was an infamous public figure due to her father's stature and her own career. She began writing her autobiography, A Narrative of the Life of Mrs. Charlotte Charke which was published in well-received installments and then as two full editions. An abridged form appeared in the Gentleman's Magazine. This was one of the first autobiographies ever written by a woman.

Charke's tone is described as like her father's; chatty, witty, relaxed, and intimate. It is a mixture of honesty and self-flattery, but without the self-aggrandizement of her father's style. She wrote the autobiography, she said, to reconcile herself with her father, although it was not successful. He refused to communicate with her, returning letters unopened. When he died on December 12, 1757, he left Charke a token £5, despite being very wealthy. In response, Charke wrote The Lover's Treat, or, Unnatural Hatred, a novel about families at war with themselves. She also published the short stories The Mercer, and The History of Charley and Patty sometime between the years of 1757 and 1759.

== Reception ==
Charke's reception tends to be skewed based on the audience of her works. She has received mixed reactions from contemporary literary authors and critics, modern scholars, and her own family.

Charke's family, particularly her father, respected her early work as an actress, when she performed traditional and feminine characters, and supported her early marriage to Richard Charke. However, they disapproved of the breeches' roles and male jobs that she later pursued to support herself and her daughter. Charke was financially cut off from the family and effectively disowned, with her father refusing to speak to her or even read her work.

In her time, Charke successfully performed as a female in male roles. These breeches roles were popular with the public. Henry Fielding specifically produced plays, including Eurydice Hiss'd and The Historical Register featuring women in disguise with Charke as a leading actor. This success allowed Charke to support herself and her child, and brought her notoriety by differentiating herself from women who became famous in traditional ways, like writing or acting in women's roles.

Her autobiography, A Narrative of the Life of Mrs. Charlotte Charke was her most critically acclaimed literary work. This work received great reviews and recommendations in addition to harshly critical views. Some authors found her work compelling and justified, while the majority found it scandalous. When it was first published, people took it as a "humorous odyssey," reading it for pure entertainment. Her life, as written in her autobiography, was seen more as a joke or a story than something that should be read for educational value. Scholars of both the eighteenth and nineteenth centuries saw Charke's work as a desperate attempt for economic gain. Later criticism of Charke's autobiography appeared in John Fyvie's novel Comedy Queens of the Georgian Era, which recalls the juxtaposition of Charke's popular reception and the impoverished reality of her life. On the outside, Charke was seen as a happy, comedic writer, when in reality, she struggled financially and emotionally, ultimately forcing her into writing as a career.

The Oxford Dictionary of National Biography states "her self-representation had already contributed significantly to the development of psychological introspection in the emerging genre of the novel." Her autobiography is known as one of the first female autobiographies written, and one of the first accounts of what it is like to be a woman who dresses and acts like a man.

== Notable roles ==
- Mademoiselle in 'The Provok'd Wife' by John Vanbrugh in April 1730 at Drury Lane. Also November 1732 at Drury Lane. Also April 1735 at Drury Lane.
- Aurora in 'Cephalus and Procris' in February 1731 at Drury Lane. Also in May 1732 at Drury Lane. Also May 1734 at Drury Lane.
- Lucy in 'The London Merchant' by George Lilo in July 1731 at Drury Lane. Also in October 1731, August 1732 at Drury Lane. Also August 1732 at Drury Lane. Also October 1732 at Drury Lane. Also in December 1733 at Theatre Royal Haymarket. Also December 1735 at Drury Lane.
- Thalia in 'The Triumphs of Love and Honour' in August 1731 at Drury Lane.
- Trusty in 'The Provoked Husband by Colley Cibber in November 1731 at Drury Lane.
- Mrs Raisin in 'Greenwich Park' in December 1731 at Drury Lane. Also in October 1732 at Drury Lane.
- Lately in The Modern Husband by Henry Fielding in February 1732 at Drury Lane.
- Cloris in 'The Rehearsal' by George Villers in April 1732 at Drury Lane.
- Clarinda in The Double Gallant in May 1732 at Drury Lane. Also in October 1732 at Drury Lane. Also October 1733 at Theatre Royal Haymarket.
- Andromache in 'The Distrest Mother' by Ambrose Philips in June 1732 at Drury Lane.
- Tragedo in 'The London Merchant' in by George Lilo July 1732 at Drury Lane.
- Roderigo in 'Othello' by William Shakespeare in August 1732 at Drury Lane. Also May 1734 at Drury Lane.
- Mrs Slammekin in The Beggar's Opera by John Gay in August 1732 at Drury Lane. Also December 1732 at Drury Lane.
- Lucy in 'The History of King Henry and the Villith and Anne Bullen' in September 1732 at Bartholomew Fair.
- Mrs Lupine in 'Caelia' or 'The Perjur'd Lover' by Charles Johnson in December 1732 at Drury Lane.
- Fainlove in 'The Tender Husband' by Richard Steele in January 1733 at Drury Lane. Also November 1734 at Drury Lane.
- Molly in 'The Boarding School' by Charles Coffey in January 1733 at Drury Lane.
- Procris in Cephalus and Procris in January 1733 at Drury Lane.
- Hoyden in 'The Relapse' by John Vanbrugh in March 1733 at Drury Lane. Also October 1734 at Drury Lane.
- Alicia om 'Jane Shore' by Nicholas Rowe in April 1733 at Drury Lane.
- Haly in 'Tamerlane The Great Nicholas Rowe in August 1733 at Bartholomew Fair.
- Louisa in Love Makes a Man by Colley Cibber in October 1733 at Drury Lane. Also November 1734 at Drury Lane. Also in November 1735 at Drury Lane.
- Sylvia in The Recruiting Officer by George Farquhar in November 1733 at Theatre Royal Haymarket.
- Lady Pride in 'The Amarous Widow' or 'The Wanton Wife' by Thomas Betterton in November 1733 at Theatre Royal Haymarket.
- Charlotte in 'Oroonoko' in November 1733 at Theatre Royal Haymarket. Also in October 1734 at Drury Lane.
- Marcia in 'Cato' by Joseph Addison in November 1733 at Theatre Royal Haymarket.
- Abigail in 'The Scournful Lady' by John Fletcher in December 1733 at Theatre Royal Haymarket. Also February 1735 at Drury Lane.
- Lady Woudbe in 'Volpone' by Ben Jonson in December 1733 at Theatre Royal Haymarket.
- Mrs Otter in 'The Silent Woman' by Ben Jonson in December 1733 at Theatre Royal Haymarket.
- Isabella in 'Wit Without Money' by John Fletcher in December 1733 at Theatre Royal Haymarket.
- Douglass in 'The Albion Queens' by Barton Booth in January 1734 at Theatre Royal Haymarket. Also in April 1735 at Drury Lane.
- Talanthe in 'Chronnohotonthologos' by Henry Carey February 1734 at Theatre Royal Haymarket.
- Lucilla in 'The Fair Penitent' by Nicholas Rowe in March 1734 at Drury Lane.
- Primorse in 'The Mother-In-Law' in May 1734 at Drury Lane.
- Lord Flame in The Beggar's Opera by John Gay in May 1734 at Theatre Royal Haymarket.
- Macheath in 'The Beggar's Opera' by John Gay in June 1734 Theatre Royal Haymarket. Also in July 1736 Theatre Royal Haymarket. Also in August 1736 at Theatre Royal Haymarket.
- Sir John in 'The Humours of Sir John Falsatff' in June 1734 at Theatre Royal Haymarket.
- Charlotte in 'Oroonoko' in June 1734 at Theatre Royal Haymarket.
- George Barnwell in 'The London Merchant' by George Lilo in June 1734 at Theatre Royal Haymarket. Also July 1735 at the Theatre in Lincoln's Inn Field. Also April 1736 at Theatre Royal Haymarket.
- Lothario in 'The Fair Penitent' by Nicholas Rowe in June 1734 at Theatre Royal Haymarket.
- Heartly in 'The Nonjuror' by Colley Cibber in June 1734 at Theatre Royal Haymarket.
- Minerva in 'Penelope' or 'The Fair Disconsolate' in July 1734 at Theatre Royal Haymarket.
- Harry in 'The Humorous Election' by a Miss Jones in July 1734 at Theatre Royal Haymarket.
- Polly in 'The Beggar's Opera' by John Gay in August 1734 at Theatre Royal Haymarket. Also September 1735 at the Theatre in Lincoln's Inn Field.
- Sir Charles in The Beaux' Stratagem by George Farquhar in August 1734 at Theatre Royal Haymarket.
- Townly in 'The Provok'd Husband' by Colley Cibber in August 1734 at Theatre Royal Haymarket
- Eboli in 'Don Carlos, Prince of Spain' in August 1734 at Bartholomew Fair.
- Dol Common in 'The Alchymist' by Ben Jonson in September 1734 at Drury Lane.
- Lucy in 'The Old Batchelor' by William Congrave in October 1743 at Drury Lane.
- Foppington in The Careless Husband by Colley Cibber in June 1735 at the Theatre in Lincoln's Inn Field.
- Milwood in 'The London Merchant' by George Lilo in July 1735 at Drury Lane. Also in October 1735 at the Theatre in Lincoln's Inn Field.
- Sir Frances in 'The Provok'd Husband' by Colley Cibber in August 1735 at the Theatre in Lincoln's Inn Field.
- Archer in 'Squire Basinghall' by Edward Phillips in August 1735 at the Theatre in Lincoln's Inn Field.
- Gazetteer in 'Squire Basinghall' by Edward Phillips in August 1735 at the Theatre in Lincoln's Inn Field.
- Grizzle in 'The Tragedy of Tragedies' by Henry Fieldingin August 1735 at the Theatre in Lincoln's Inn Field.
- Pickle Herring in 'Bartholomew Fair' by Ben Jonson in August 1735 at the Theatre in Lincoln's Inn Field.
- Charles in 'Love Makes A Man' in August 1735 at the Theatre in Lincoln's Inn Field.
- French Harlequin in 'The Carnival' or 'Harlequin Blunderer' by Charlotte Charke in August 1735 at the Theatre in Lincoln's Inn Field.
- Lord Place in 'Pasquin' by Henry Fielding in March 1736 at Theatre Royal Haymarket.
- Tim in 'The Female Rake' by Dormer in April 1736 at Theatre Royal Haymarket.
- Clymene in 'Pasquin' by Henry Fielding in April 1736 at Theatre Royal Haymarket.
- Agnes in 'Guilt Its Own Punishment' by George Lilo in May 1736 at Theatre Royal Haymarket.
- Gaylove in 'The Honest Yorkshire Man' by Henry Fieldings in December 1736 at Theatre Royal Haymarket.
