= An Apology for the Life of Colley Cibber =

1740 autobiography

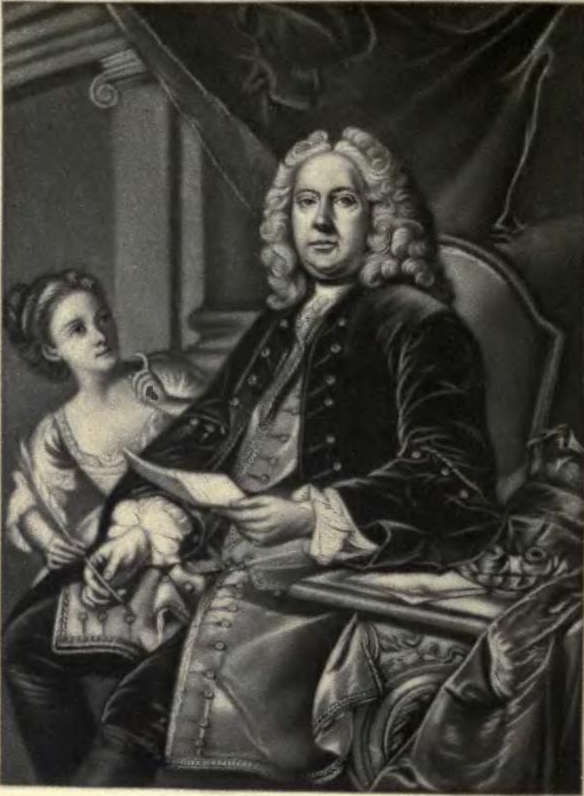
- Portrait of Cibber at the front of the book.
- Author: Colley Cibber
- Language: English
- Genre: Autobiography
- Publication date: 1740
- Publication place: Great Britain
- Media type: Print

An Apology for the Life of Colley Cibber is a memoir by the British playwright, actor-manager and current Poet Laureate published in 1740. Popular with the public, it was an autobiography of Cibber's career, a more general history of the Restoration theatre from 1690 to 1733, and a miscellany of theatrical anecdotes from Cibber's day. Its genre-defying character and veracity are still subject to scholarly debate. Upon its release, the Apology was attacked by Cibber's contemporary rivals, including Alexander Pope and Henry Fielding, continuing a pattern of satirical ripostes between these literary figures. The first quarto edition was quickly followed by a second octavo edition; later editions in 1750, 1756, and 1761 came after the sale of the copyright to Robert and John Dodsley.

== Bibliography ==
- Baines, Paul & Ferarro, Julian & Rogers, Pat. The Wiley-Blackwell Encyclopedia of Eighteenth-Century Writers and Writing, 1660–1789. Wiley-Blackwell, 2011.
- McGirr, Elaine M. Partial Histories: A Reappraisal of Colley Cibber. Springer, 2016.
- Schoch, Richard. Writing the History of the British Stage: 1660–1900. Cambridge University Press, 2016.
