= Richard Steere (author) =

American poet

Richard Steere (c. 1643–1721) was born in Chertsey, Surrey, England, probably in 1643. Steere emigrated to the American colonies, probably to Massachusetts.

== Poetry ==
Steere is known for a book of poetry, A Monumental Memorial of Marine Mercy, and for The Daniel Catcher (1713), an anti-Catholic answer to Absalom and Achitophel by John Dryden. These were published in Boston. The modern critic Donald P. Wharton described him as "a poet unusually versatile for his time and place, [who] adds a dimension to the study of 17th-century American poetry."
