= Richard Charke =

English violinist, composer, and playwright

Richard Charke (c. 1709 – c. 1738) was an English violinist, composer, operatic baritone, and playwright.

Charke was born in London. He initially worked as a dancing-master before being appointed by Colley Cibber as leader of the orchestra at the Theatre Royal, Drury Lane in 1729. Soon thereafter, he began performing as a solo violinist and singing in small roles at the theatre. He eventually graduated to lead roles in the musical productions at Drury Lane, starring in such productions as Henry Carey’s The Contrivances (1729) and Cibber’s Damon and Phillida (1729).

Charke possessed a good sense of humor and had a talent for wit, which he ultimately made use of in pantomimes, mostly as a composer but also as a writer. He wrote several amusing "Medley Overtures" that became highly popular for pantomime performances during the 1730s and 1740s. He authored only one pantomime, Harlequin Restored, or, The Country Revels, which contained music by both himself and Thomas Arne and premiered at Drury Lane on 14 December 1732 (although the Burney Collection of newspapers showing contemporary playbills give the date as 20 March 1732).

In addition to his contribution to pantomimes, Charke composed one ballad opera, The Festival, which premiered in 1734 and starred Susannah Maria Cibber. He also contributed songs to W.R. Chetwood's The Lovers Opera (1729) and The Generous Freemason (1730), and to James Miller's The Humours of Oxford (1730).

Charke's private life was somewhat tragic. In 1730, he married his manager's youngest daughter, Charlotte Cibber, with whom he quarreled incessantly. Only a few months into their marriage, he began to pursue affairs with other women. He also had a penchant for gambling and for spending money frivolously. In the summer of 1736, he fled England for Jamaica in order to avoid his gambling debts and debtor's prison. He became ill shortly after arriving in Jamaica, dying in either late 1737 or early 1738.

== Sources ==
- Roger Fiske and Linda Troost: "Richard Charke", Grove Music Online ed. L. Macy (Accessed 11 December 2008), (subscription access)
