= Colley Cibber =

English actor-manager, playwright, and poet laureate (1671-1757)

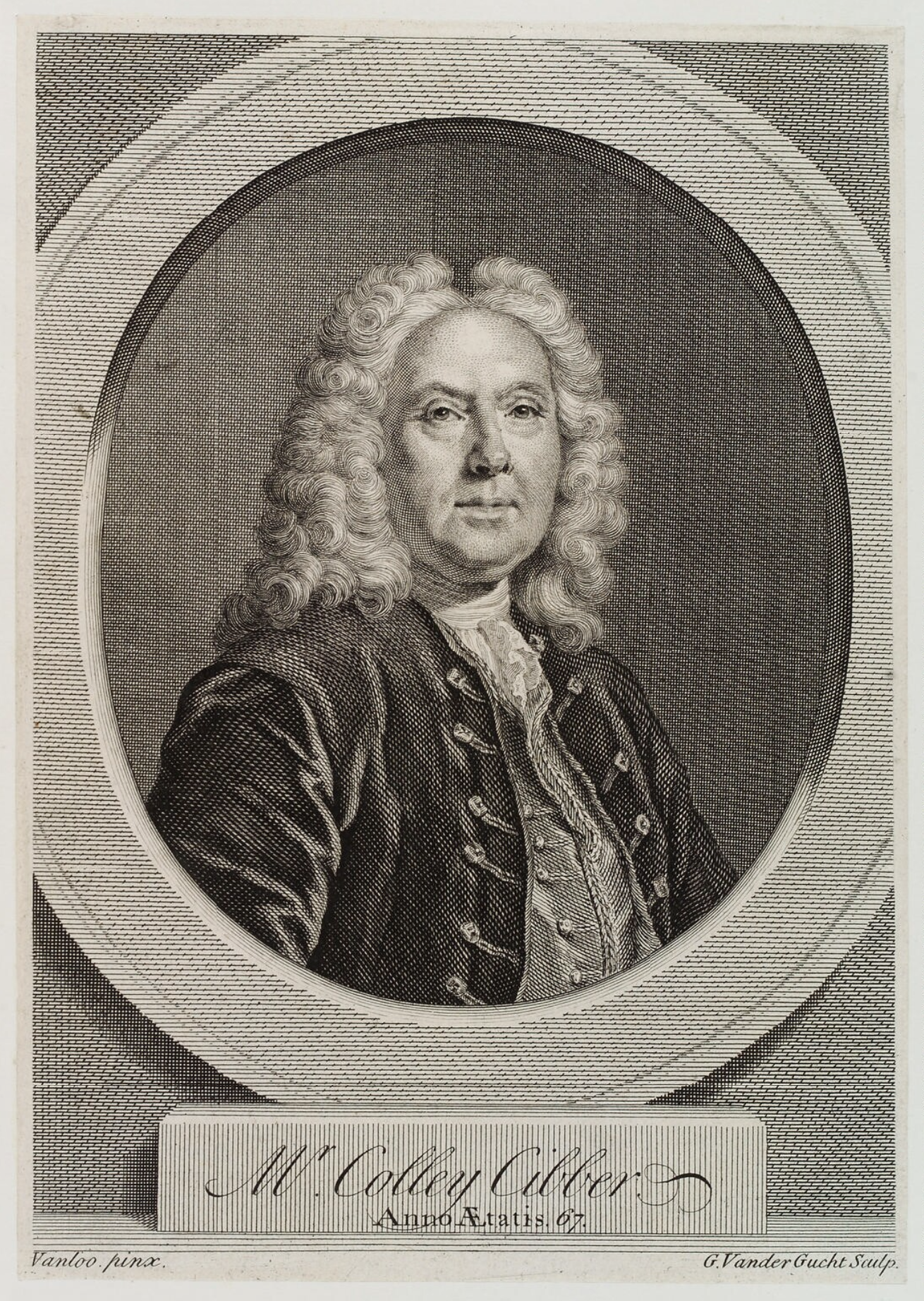

Poet Laureate of the United Kingdom
- In office 3 December 1730 – 12 December 1757
- Monarch: George II
- Preceded by: Laurence Eusden
- Succeeded by: William Whitehead

Personal details
- Born: 6 November 1671 Southampton Street, London, England
- Died: 11 December 1757 (aged 86) Berkeley Square, London, England
- Spouse: Catherine Cibber
- Children: 12, including Charlotte Charke and Theophilus Cibber
- Parent: Caius Gabriel Cibber (father)
- Occupation: Actor, theatre manager, playwright, poet
- Known for: Works include his autobiography and several comedies of historical interest Appointed Poet Laureate in 1730

Colley Cibber (6 November 1671 – 11 December 1757) was an English actor-manager, playwright and Poet Laureate. His colourful memoir An Apology for the Life of Colley Cibber (1740) describes his life in a personal, anecdotal and even rambling style. He wrote 25 plays for his own company at Drury Lane, half of which were adapted from various sources, which led Robert Lowe and Alexander Pope, among others, to criticise his "miserable mutilation" of "crucified Molière [and] hapless Shakespeare".

He regarded himself as first and foremost an actor and had great popular success in comical fop parts, while as a tragic actor he was persistent but much ridiculed. Cibber's brash, extroverted personality did not sit well with his contemporaries, and he was frequently accused of tasteless theatrical productions, shady business methods, and a social and political opportunism that was thought to have gained him the laureateship over far better poets. He rose to ignominious fame when he became the chief target, the head Dunce, of Alexander Pope's satirical poem The Dunciad.

Cibber's poetical work was derided in his time and has been remembered only for being poor. His importance in British theatre history rests on his being one of the first in a long line of actor-managers, on the interest of two of his comedies as documents of evolving early 18th-century taste and ideology, and on the value of his autobiography as a historical source.

== Life ==
Cibber was born in Southampton Street, in Bloomsbury, London. He was the eldest child of Caius Gabriel Cibber, a distinguished sculptor originally from Denmark. His mother, Jane née Colley, came from a family of gentry from Glaston, Rutland. He was educated at the King's School, Grantham, from 1682 until the age of 16, but failed to win a place at Winchester College, which had been founded by his maternal ancestor William of Wykeham. In 1688, he joined the service of his father's patron, Lord Devonshire, who was one of the prime supporters of the Glorious Revolution. After the revolution, and at a loose end in London, he was attracted to the stage and in 1690 began work as an actor in Thomas Betterton's United Company at the Drury Lane Theatre. "Poor, at odds with his parents, and entering the theatrical world at a time when players were losing their power to businessmen-managers", on 6 May 1693 Cibber married Katherine Shore, the daughter of Matthias Shore, sergeant-trumpeter to the King, despite his poor prospects and insecure, socially inferior job.

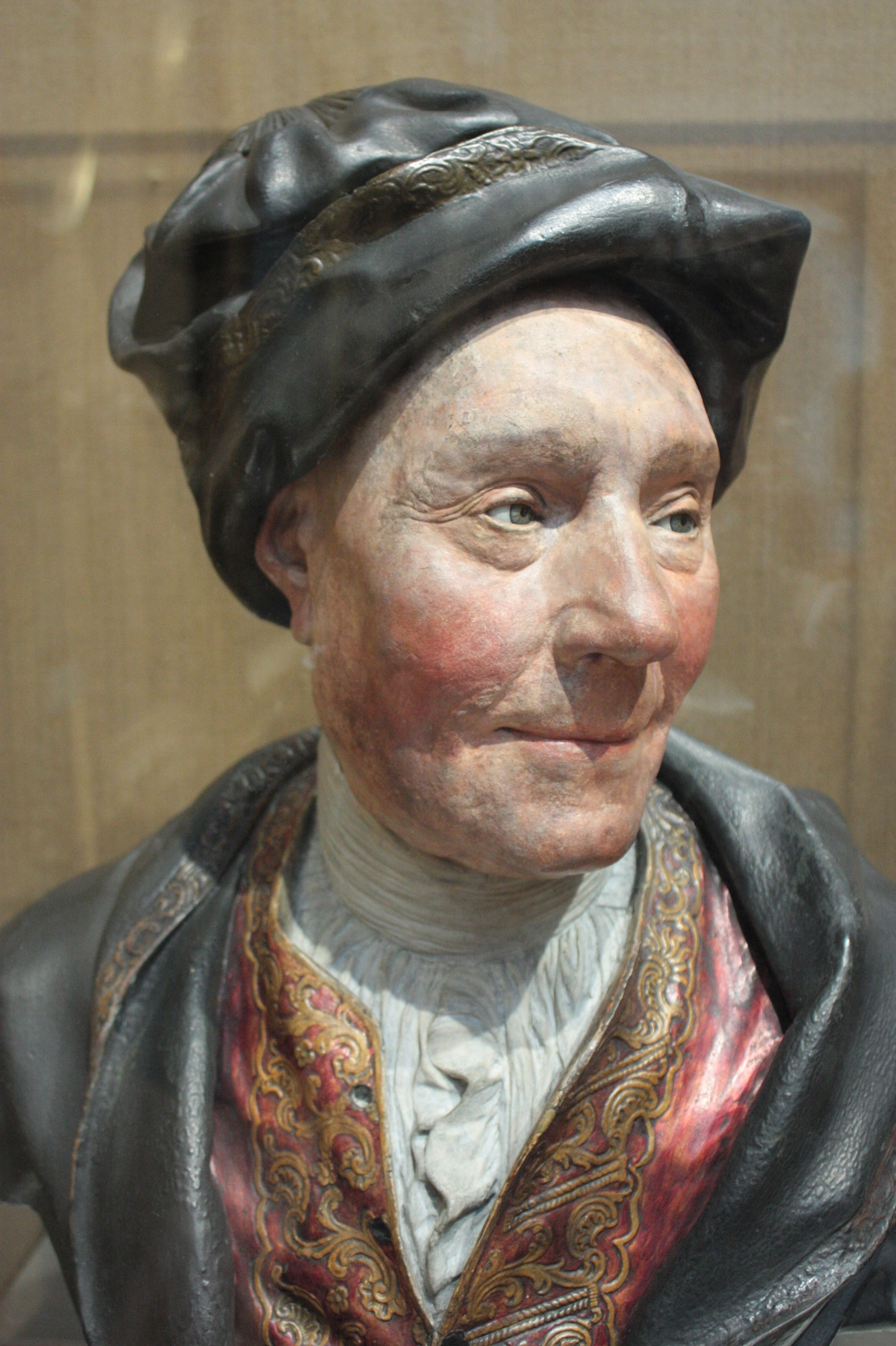
Colley Cibber c. 1740, painted plaster bust, National Portrait Gallery, London

Cibber and Katherine had 12 children between 1694 and 1713. Six died in infancy, and most of the surviving children received short shrift in his will. Catherine, the eldest surviving daughter, married Colonel James Brown and seems to have been the dutiful one who looked after Cibber in old age following his wife's death in 1734. She was duly rewarded at his death with most of his estate. His middle daughters, Anne and Elizabeth, went into business. Anne had a shop that sold fine wares and foods, and married John Boultby. Elizabeth had a restaurant near Gray's Inn, and married firstly Dawson Brett, and secondly (after Brett's death) Joseph Marples. His only son to reach adulthood, Theophilus, became an actor at Drury Lane, and was an embarrassment to his father because of his scandalous private life. His other son to survive infancy, James, died in or after 1717, before reaching adulthood. Colley's youngest daughter Charlotte followed in her father's theatrical footsteps, but she fell out with him and her sister Catherine, and she was cut off by the family.

After an inauspicious start as an actor, Cibber eventually became a popular comedian, wrote and adapted many plays, and rose to become one of the newly empowered businessmen-managers. He took over the management of Drury Lane in 1710 and took a highly commercial, if not artistically successful, line in the job. In 1730, he was made Poet Laureate, an appointment which attracted widespread scorn, particularly from Alexander Pope and other Tory satirists. Off-stage, he was a keen gambler, and was one of the investors in the South Sea Company.

In the last two decades of his life, Cibber remained prominent in society, and summered in Georgian spas such as Tunbridge Wells, Scarborough and Bath. He was friendly with the writer Samuel Richardson, the actress Margaret Woffington and the memoirist–poet Laetitia Pilkington. Aged 73 in 1745, he made his last appearance on the stage as Pandulph in his own "deservedly unsuccessful" Papal Tyranny in the Reign of King John. In 1750, he fell seriously ill and recommended his friend and protégé Henry Jones as the next Poet Laureate. Cibber recovered and Jones passed into obscurity. Cibber died suddenly at his house in Berkeley Square, London, in December 1757, leaving small pecuniary legacies to four of his five surviving children, £1,000 each (the equivalent of approximately £180,000 in 2011) to his granddaughters Jane and Elizabeth (the daughters of Theophilus), and the residue of his estate to his eldest daughter Catherine. He was buried on 18 December, probably at the Grosvenor Chapel on South Audley Street.

== Autobiography ==
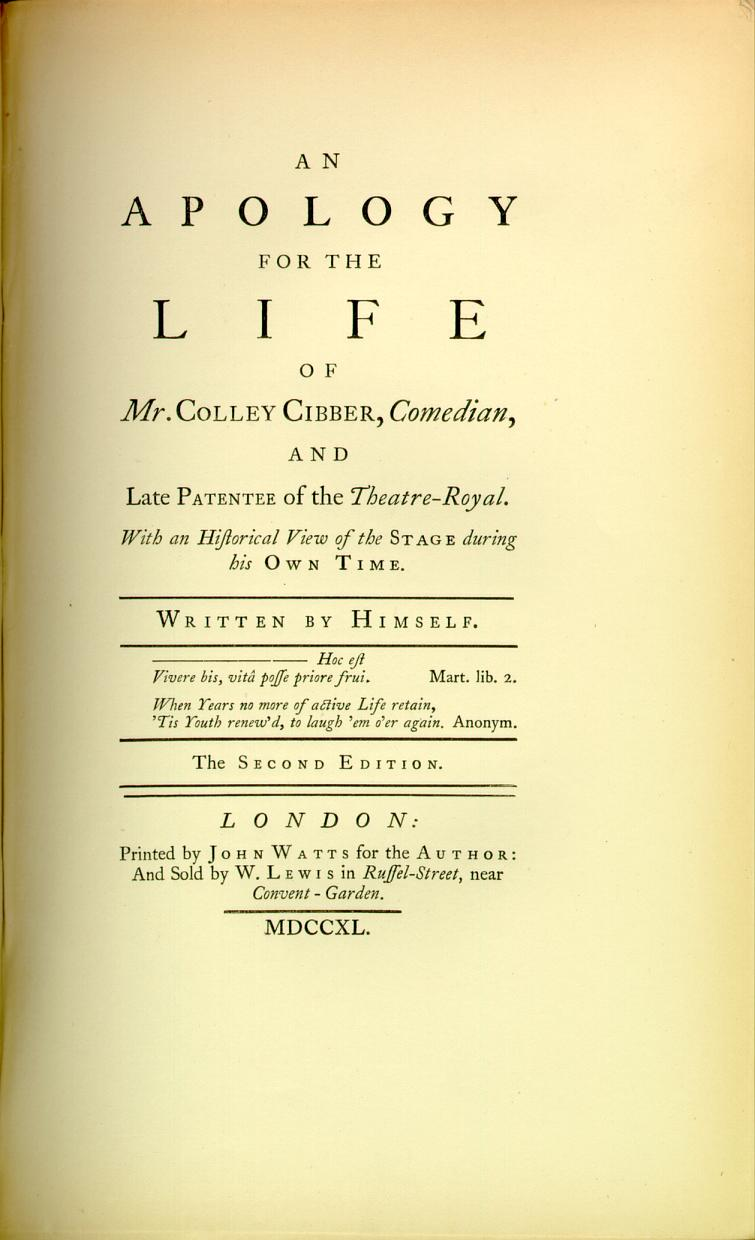
Title page of Cibber's Apology

Cibber's colourful autobiography An Apology for the Life of Colley Cibber, Comedian (1740) was chatty, meandering, anecdotal, vain, and occasionally inaccurate. At the time of writing the word "apology" meant an apologia, a statement in defence of one's actions rather than an expression of regret at having transgressed.

The text virtually ignores his wife and family, but Cibber wrote in detail about his time in the theatre, especially his early years as a young actor at Drury Lane in the 1690s, giving a vivid account of the cut-throat theatre company rivalries and chicanery of the time, as well as providing pen portraits of the actors he knew. The Apology is vain and self-serving, as both his contemporaries and later commentators have pointed out, but it also serves as Cibber's rebuttal to his harshest critics, especially Pope. For the early part of Cibber's career, it is unreliable in respect of chronology and other hard facts, understandably, since it was written 50 years after the events, apparently without the help of a journal or notes. Nevertheless, it is an invaluable source for all aspects of the early 18th-century theatre in London, for which documentation is otherwise scanty. Because he worked with many actors from the early days of Restoration theatre, such as Thomas Betterton and Elizabeth Barry at the end of their careers, and lived to see David Garrick perform, he is a bridge between the earlier mannered and later more naturalistic styles of performance.

The Apology was a popular work and gave Cibber a good return. Its complacency infuriated some of his contemporaries, notably Pope, but even the usually critical Samuel Johnson admitted it was "very entertaining and very well done". It went through four editions in his lifetime, and more after his death, and generations of readers have found it an amusing and engaging read, projecting an author always "happy in his own good opinion, the best of all others; teeming with animal spirits, and uniting the self-sufficiency of youth with the garrulity of age."

== Actor ==
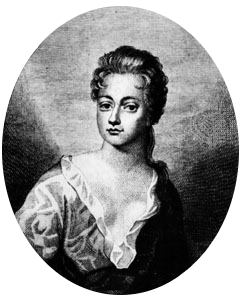
Cibber had "melancholy Prospect of ever playing a Lover with" leading actress Mrs. Bracegirdle.

Cibber began his career as an actor at Drury Lane in 1690, and had little success for several years. "The first Thing that enters into the Head of a young Actor", he wrote in his autobiography half a century later, "is that of being a Hero: In this Ambition I was soon snubb'd by the Insufficiency of my Voice; to which might be added an uninform'd meagre Person ... with a dismal pale Complexion. Under these Disadvantages, I had but a melancholy Prospect of ever playing a Lover with Mrs. Bracegirdle, which I had flatter'd my Hopes that my Youth might one Day have recommended me to." At this time the London stage was in something of a slump after the glories of the early Restoration period. The King's and Duke's companies had merged into a monopoly, leaving actors in a weak negotiating position and much at the mercy of the dictatorial manager Christopher Rich. When the senior actors rebelled and established a cooperative company of their own in 1695, Cibber—"wisely", as the Biographical Dictionary of Actors puts it—stayed with the remnants of the old company, "where the competition was less keen". After five years, he had still not seen significant success in his chosen profession, and there had been no heroic parts and no love scenes. However, the return of two-company rivalry created a sudden demand for new plays, and Cibber seized this opportunity to launch his career by writing a comedy with a big, flamboyant part for himself to play. He scored a double triumph: his comedy Love's Last Shift, or The Fool in Fashion (1696) was a great success, and his own uninhibited performance as the Frenchified fop Sir Novelty Fashion ("a coxcomb that loves to be the first in all foppery") delighted the audiences. His name was made, both as playwright and as comedian.

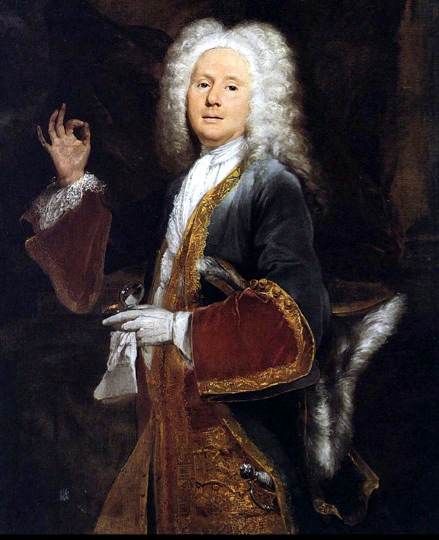
Colley Cibber plays the part of Lord Foppington in John Vanbrugh's comedy The Relapse

Later in life, when Cibber himself had the last word in casting at Drury Lane, he wrote, or patched together, several tragedies that were tailored to fit his continuing hankering after playing "a Hero". However, his performances of such parts never pleased audiences, which wanted to see him typecast as an affected fop, a kind of character that fitted both his private reputation as a vain man, his exaggerated, mannered style of acting, and his habit of ad libbing. His most famous part for the rest of his career remained that of Lord Foppington in The Relapse, a sequel to Cibber's own Love's Last Shift but written by John Vanbrugh, first performed in 1696 with Cibber reprising his performance as Sir Novelty Fashion in the newly ennobled guise of Lord Foppington. Pope mentions the audience jubilation that greeted the small-framed Cibber donning Lord Foppington's enormous wig, which would be ceremoniously carried on stage in its own sedan chair. Vanbrugh reputedly wrote the part of Lord Foppington deliberately "to suit the eccentricities of Cibber's acting style".

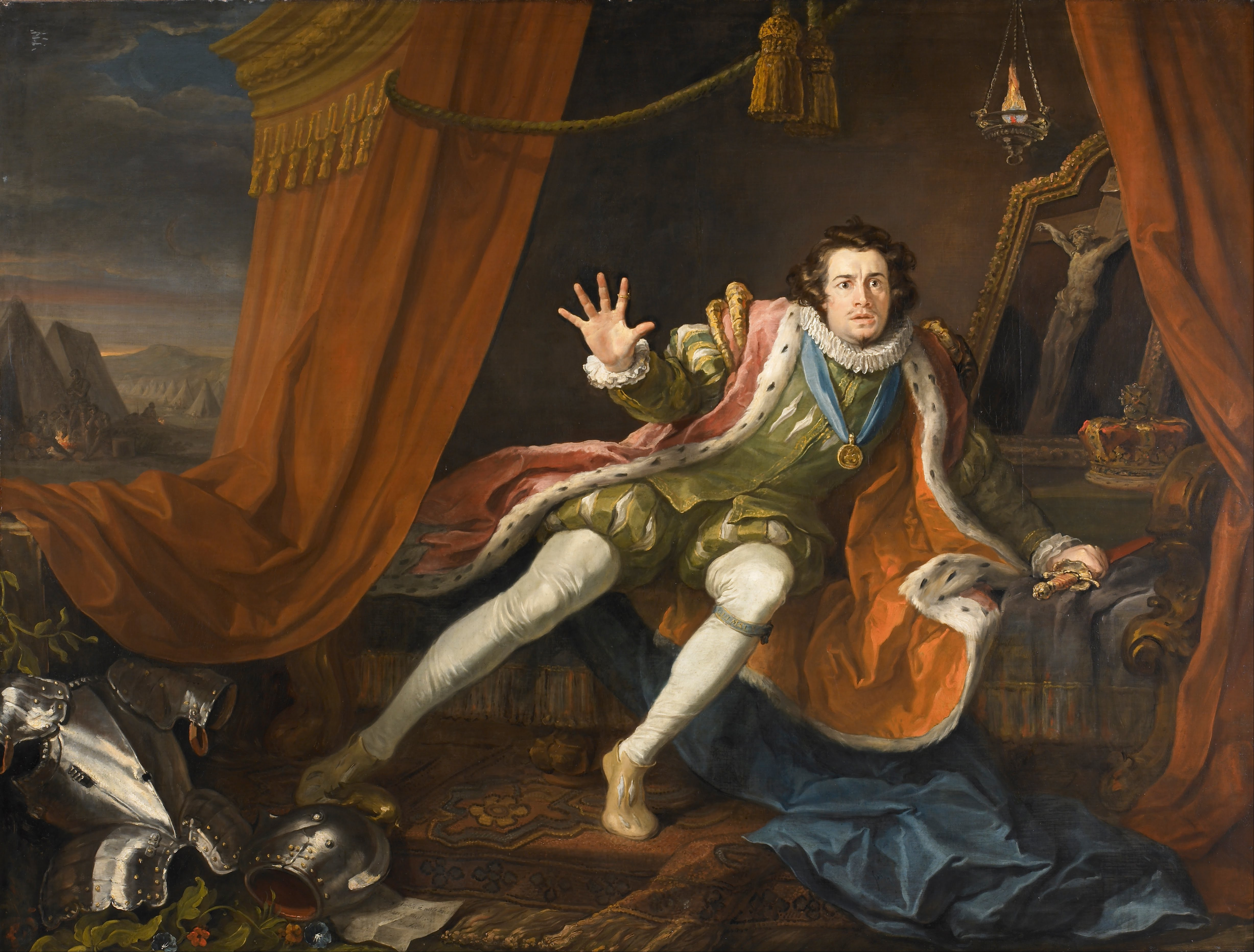
David Garrick's innovative realistic performance as Richard III broke with Cibber's melodrama tradition.

His tragic efforts, however, were consistently ridiculed by contemporaries: when Cibber in the role of Richard III made love to Lady Anne, the Grub Street Journal wrote, "he looks like a pickpocket, with his shrugs and grimaces, that has more a design on her purse than her heart". Cibber was on the stage in every year but two (1727 and 1731) between his debut in 1690 and his retirement in 1732, playing more than 100 parts in all in nearly 3,000 documented performances. After he had sold his interest in Drury Lane in 1733 and was a wealthy man in his sixties, he returned to the stage occasionally to play the classic fop parts of Restoration comedy for which audiences appreciated him. His Lord Foppington in Vanbrugh's The Relapse, Sir Courtly Nice in John Crowne's Sir Courtly Nice, and Sir Fopling Flutter in George Etherege's Man of Mode were legendary. Critic John Hill in his 1775 work The actor, or, A treatise on the art of playing, described Cibber as "the best Lord Foppington who ever appeared, was in real life (with all due respect be it spoken by one who loves him) something of the coxcomb". These were the kind of comic parts where Cibber's affectation and mannerism were desirable. In 1738–39, he played Shallow in Shakespeare's Henry IV, Part 2 to critical acclaim, but his Richard III (in his own version of the play) was not well received. In the middle of the play, he whispered to fellow actor Benjamin Victor that he wanted to go home, perhaps realising he was too old for the part and its physical demands. Cibber also essayed tragic parts in plays by Shakespeare, Ben Jonson, John Dryden and others, but with less success. By the end of his acting career, audiences were being entranced by the innovatively naturalistic acting of the rising star David Garrick, who made his London debut in the title part in a production of Cibber's adaptation of Richard III in 1741. He returned to the stage for a final time in 1745 as Cardinal Pandulph in his play Papal Tyranny in the Reign of King John.

== Playwright ==
=== Love's Last Shift ===
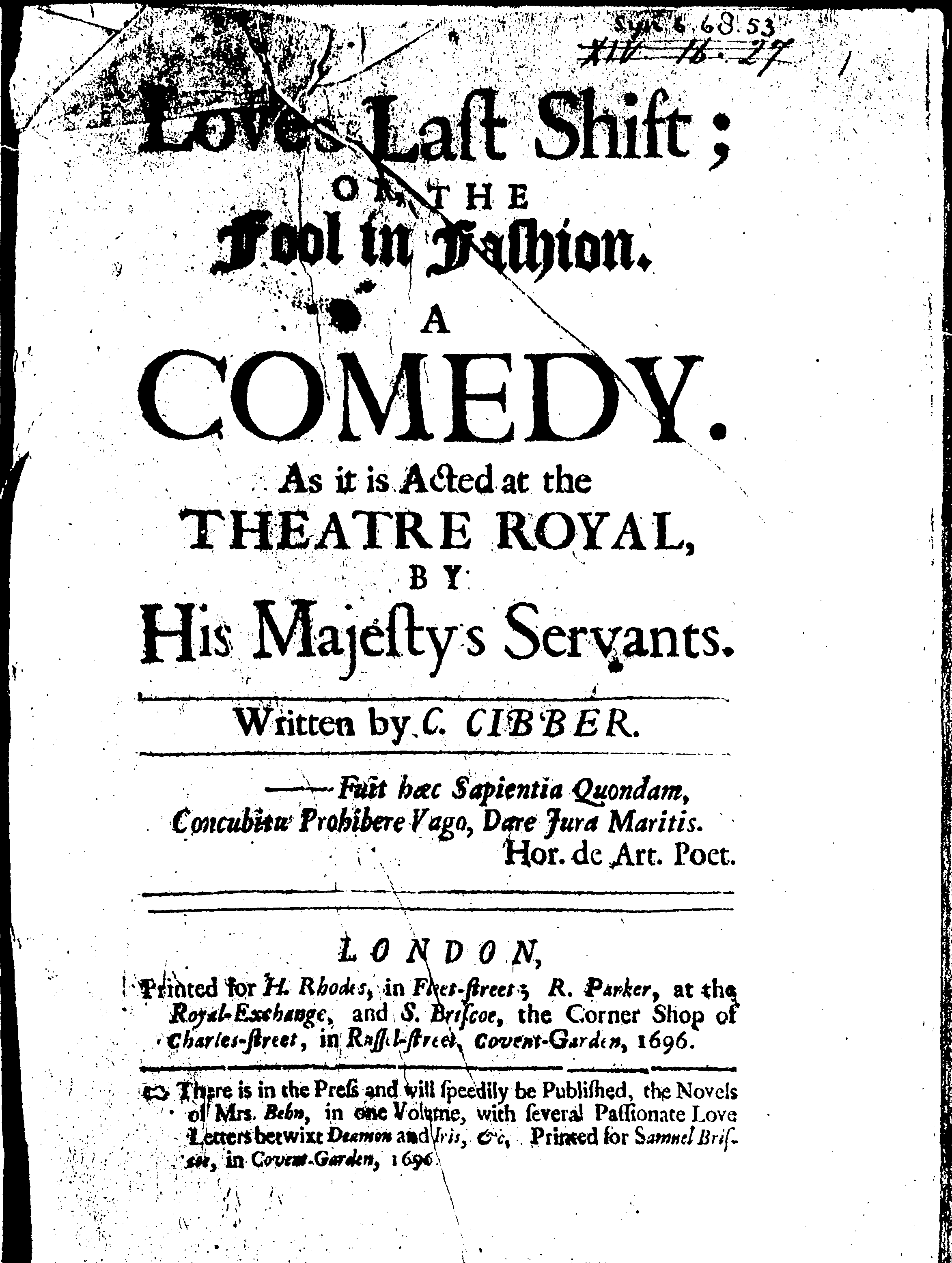
Love's Last Shift, published 1696

Cibber's comedy Love's Last Shift (1696) is an early herald of a massive shift in audience taste, away from the intellectualism and sexual frankness of Restoration comedy and towards the conservative certainties and gender-role backlash of exemplary or sentimental comedy. According to Paul Parnell, Love's Last Shift illustrates Cibber's opportunism at a moment in time before the change was assured: fearless of self-contradiction, he puts something for everybody into his first play, combining the old outspokenness with the new preachiness.

The central action of Love's Last Shift is a celebration of the power of a good woman, Amanda, to reform a rakish husband, Loveless, by means of sweet patience and a daring bed-trick. She masquerades as a prostitute and seduces Loveless without being recognised, and then confronts him with logical argument. Since he enjoyed the night with her while taking her for a stranger, a wife can be as good in bed as an illicit mistress. Loveless is convinced and stricken, and a rich choreography of mutual kneelings, risings and prostrations follows, generated by Loveless' penitence and Amanda's "submissive eloquence". The première audience is said to have wept at this climactic scene. The play was a great box-office success and was for a time the talk of the town, in both a positive and a negative sense. Some contemporaries regarded it as moving and amusing, others as a sentimental tear-jerker, incongruously interspersed with sexually explicit Restoration comedy jokes and semi-nude bedroom scenes.

Love's Last Shift is today read mainly to gain a perspective on Vanbrugh's sequel The Relapse, which has by contrast remained a stage favourite. Modern scholars often endorse the criticism that was levelled at Love's Last Shift from the first, namely that it is a blatantly commercial combination of sex scenes and drawn-out sentimental reconciliations. Cibber's follow-up comedy Woman's Wit (1697) was produced under hasty and unpropitious circumstances and had no discernible theme; Cibber, not usually shy about any of his plays, even elided its name in the Apology. It was followed by the equally unsuccessful tragedy Xerxes (1699). Cibber reused parts of Woman's Wit for The School Boy (1702).

=== Richard III ===
Perhaps partly because of the failure of his previous two plays, Cibber's next effort was an adaptation of Shakespeare's Richard III. Neither Cibber's adaptations nor his own original plays have stood the test of time, and hardly any of them have been staged or reprinted after the early 18th century, but his popular adaptation of Richard III remained the standard stage version for 150 years. The American actor George Berrell wrote in the 1870s that Richard III was:

a hodge-podge concocted by Colley Cibber, who cut and transposed the original version, and added to it speeches from four or five other of Shakespeare's plays, and several really fine speeches of his own. The speech to Buckingham: "I tell thee, coz, I've lately had two spiders crawling o'er my startled hopes"—the well-known line "Off with his head! So much for Buckingham!" the speech ending with "Conscience, avaunt! Richard's himself again!"—and other lines of power and effect were written by Cibber, who, with all due respect to the 'divine bard,' improved upon the original, for acting purposes.

Richard III was followed by another adaptation, the comedy Love Makes a Man, which was constructed by splicing together two plays by John Fletcher: The Elder Brother and The Custom of the Country. Cibber's confidence was apparently restored by the success of the two plays, and he returned to more original writing.

=== The Careless Husband ===
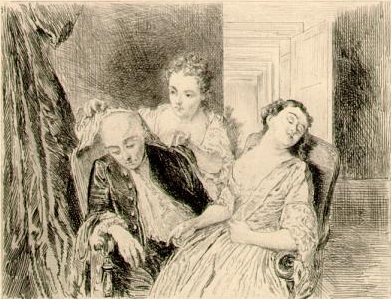
Outstanding wifely tact in The Careless Husband: Lady Easy finds her husband asleep with the maid and places her scarf on his head so that he will not catch cold, but will know that she has seen him.

The comedy The Careless Husband (1704), generally considered to be Cibber's best play, is another example of the retrieval of a straying husband by means of outstanding wifely tact, this time in a more domestic and genteel register. The easy-going Sir Charles Easy is chronically unfaithful to his wife, seducing both ladies of quality and his own female servants with insouciant charm. The turning point of the action, known as "the Steinkirk scene", comes when his wife finds him and a maidservant asleep together in a chair, "as close an approximation to actual adultery as could be presented on the 18th-century stage". His periwig has fallen off, an obvious suggestion of intimacy and abandon, and an opening for Lady Easy's tact. Soliloquizing to herself about how sad it would be if he caught cold, she "takes a Steinkirk off her Neck, and lays it gently on his Head" (V.i.21). (A "steinkirk" was a loosely tied lace collar or scarf, named after the way the officers wore their cravats at the Battle of Steenkirk in 1692.) She steals away, Sir Charles wakes, notices the steinkirk on his head, marvels that his wife did not wake him and make a scene, and realises how wonderful she is. The Easys go on to have a reconciliation scene which is much more low-keyed and tasteful than that in Love's Last Shift, without kneelings and risings, and with Lady Easy shrinking with feminine delicacy from the coarse subjects that Amanda had broached without blinking. Paul Parnell has analysed the manipulative nature of Lady Easy's lines in this exchange, showing how they are directed towards the sentimentalist's goal of "ecstatic self-approval".

The Careless Husband was a great success on the stage and remained in repertory throughout the 18th century. Although it has now joined Love's Last Shift as a forgotten curiosity, it kept a respectable critical reputation into the 20th century, coming in for serious discussion both as an interesting example of doublethink, and as somewhat morally or emotionally insightful. In 1929, the well-known critic F. W. Bateson described the play's psychology as "mature", "plausible", "subtle", "natural", and "affecting".

=== Other plays ===
The Lady's Last Stake (1707) is a rather bad-tempered reply to critics of Lady Easy's wifely patience in The Careless Husband. It was coldly received, and its main interest lies in the glimpse the prologue gives of angry reactions to The Careless Husband, of which we would otherwise have known nothing (since all contemporary published reviews of The Careless Husband approve and endorse its message). Some, says Cibber sarcastically in the prologue, seem to think Lady Easy ought rather to have strangled her husband with her steinkirk:

Yet some there are, who still arraign the Play,
At her tame Temper shock'd, as who should say—
The Price, for a dull Husband, was too much to pay,
Had he been strangled sleeping, Who shou'd hurt ye?
When so provok'd—Revenge had been a Virtue.

Many of Cibber's plays, listed below, were hastily cobbled together from borrowings. Alexander Pope said Cibber's drastic adaptations and patchwork plays were stolen from "crucified Molière" and "hapless Shakespeare". The Double Gallant (1707) was constructed from Burnaby's The Reformed Wife and The Lady's Visiting Day and Centlivre's Love at a Venture. In the words of Leonard R. N. Ashley, Cibber took "what he could use from these old failures" to cook up "a palatable hash out of unpromising leftovers". The Comical Lovers (1707) was based on Dryden's Marriage à la Mode. The Rival Fools (1709) was based on Fletcher's Wit at Several Weapons. He rewrote Corneille's Le Cid with a happy ending as Ximena in 1712. The Provoked Husband (1728) was an unfinished fragment by John Vanbrugh that Cibber reworked and completed to great commercial success.

The Non-Juror (1717) was adapted from Molière's Tartuffe and features a Papist spy as a villain. Written just two years after the Jacobite rising of 1715, it was an obvious propaganda piece directed against Roman Catholics. The Refusal (1721) was based on Molière's Les Femmes Savantes. Cibber's last play, Papal Tyranny in the Reign of King John was "a miserable mutilation of Shakespeare's King John". Heavily politicised, it caused such a storm of ridicule during its 1736 rehearsal that Cibber withdrew it. During the Jacobite Rising of 1745, when the nation was again in fear of a Popish pretender, it was finally acted, and this time accepted for patriotic reasons.

== Manager ==
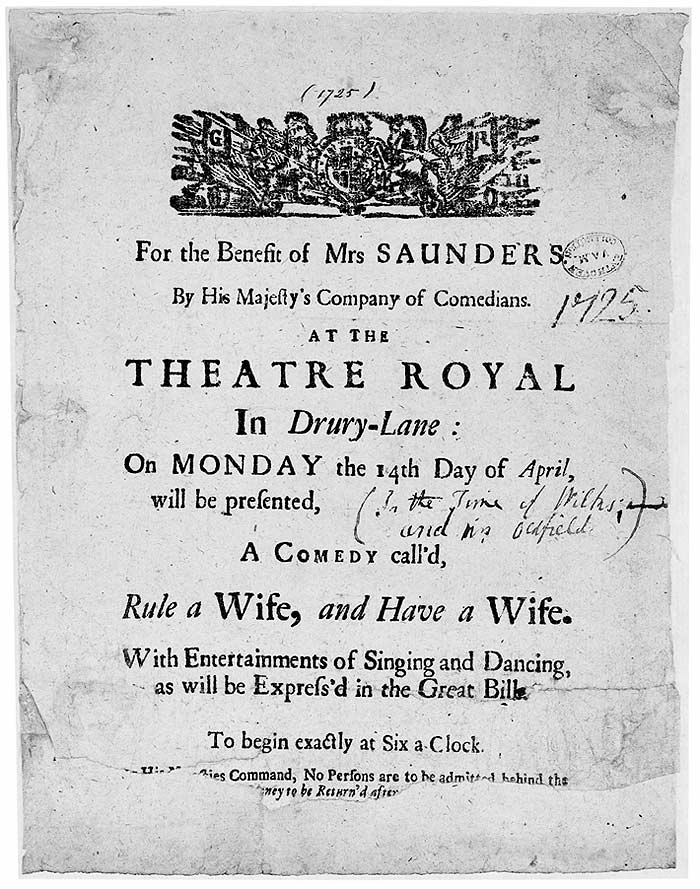
Drury Lane playbill, 1725

Cibber's career as both actor and theatre manager is important in the history of the British stage because he was one of the first in a long and illustrious line of actor-managers that would include Garrick, Henry Irving, and Herbert Beerbohm Tree. Rising from actor at Drury Lane to advisor to the manager Christopher Rich, Cibber worked himself by degrees into a position to take over the company, first taking many of its players—including Thomas Doggett, Robert Wilks, and Anne Oldfield—to form a new company at the Queen's Theatre at the Haymarket. The three actors squeezed out the previous owners in a series of lengthy and complex manoeuvres, but after Rich's letters patent were revoked, Cibber, Doggett and Wilks were able to buy the company outright and return to the Theatre Royal by 1711. After a few stormy years of power-struggle between the prudent Doggett and the extravagant Wilks, Doggett was replaced by the up-and-coming actor Barton Booth and Cibber became in practice sole manager of Drury Lane. He set a pattern for the line of more charismatic and successful actors that were to succeed him in this combination of roles. His near-contemporary Garrick, as well as the 19th-century actor-managers Irving and Tree, would later structure their careers, writing, and managerial identity around their own striking stage personalities. Cibber's forte as actor-manager was, by contrast, the manager side. He was a clever, and innovative businessman who retained all his life a love of appearing on the stage. His triumph was that he rose to a position where, in consequence of his sole power over production and casting at Drury Lane, London audiences had to put up with him as an actor. Cibber's one significant mistake as a theatre manager was to pass over John Gay's The Beggar's Opera, which became an outstanding success for John Rich's theatre at Lincoln's Inn Fields. When Cibber attempted to mimic Gay's success with his own ballad-opera—Love in a Riddle (1729)—it was shouted down by the audience and Cibber cancelled its run. He rescued its comic subplot as Damon and Phillida (1729).

Cibber had learned from the bad example of Christopher Rich to be a careful and approachable employer for his actors, and was not unpopular with them; however, he made enemies in the literary world because of the power he wielded over authors. Plays he considered non-commercial were rejected or ruthlessly reworked. Many were outraged by his sharp business methods, which may be exemplified by the characteristic way he abdicated as manager in the mid-1730s. In 1732, Booth sold his share to John Highmore, and Wilks' share fell into the hands of John Ellys after Wilks' death. Cibber leased his share in the company to his scapegrace son Theophilus for 442 pounds, but when Theophilus fell out with the other managers, they approached Cibber senior and offered to buy out his share. Without consulting Theophilus, Cibber sold his share for more than 3,000 pounds to the other managers, who promptly gave Theophilus his notice. According to one story, Cibber encouraged his son to lead the actors in a walkout and set up for themselves in the Haymarket, rendering worthless the commodity he had sold. On behalf of his son, Cibber applied for a letters patent to perform at the Haymarket, but it was refused by the Lord Chamberlain, who was "disgusted at Cibber's conduct". The Drury Lane managers attempted to shut down the rival Haymarket players by conspiring in the arrest of the lead actor, John Harper, on a charge of vagrancy, but the charge did not hold, and the attempt pushed public opinion to Theophilus' side. The Drury Lane managers were defeated, and Theophilus regained control of the company on his own terms.

== Poet ==
Cibber's appointment as Poet Laureate in December 1730 was widely assumed to be a political rather than artistic honour, and a reward for his untiring support of the Whigs, the party of Prime Minister Robert Walpole. Most of the leading writers, such as Jonathan Swift and Alexander Pope, were excluded from contention for the laureateship because they were Tories. Cibber's verses had few admirers even in his own time, and Cibber acknowledged cheerfully that he did not think much of them. His 30 birthday odes for the royal family and other duty pieces incumbent on him as Poet Laureate came in for particular scorn, and these offerings would regularly be followed by a flurry of anonymous parodies, some of which Cibber claimed in his Apology to have written himself. In the 20th century, D. B. Wyndham-Lewis and Charles Lee considered some of Cibber's laureate poems funny enough to be included in their classic "anthology of bad verse", The Stuffed Owl (1930). However, Cibber was at least as distinguished as his immediate four predecessors, three of whom were also playwrights rather than poets.

== Dunce ==
=== Pamphlet wars ===
From the beginning of the 18th century, when Cibber first rose to be Rich's right-hand man at Drury Lane, his perceived opportunism and brash, thick-skinned personality gave rise to many barbs in print, especially against his patchwork plays. The early attacks were mostly anonymous, but Daniel Defoe and Tom Brown are suggested as potential authors. Later, Jonathan Swift, John Dennis and Henry Fielding all lambasted Cibber in print. The most famous conflict Cibber had was with Alexander Pope.

Pope's animosity began in 1717 when he helped John Arbuthnot and John Gay write a farce, Three Hours After Marriage, in which one of the characters, "Plotwell" was modelled on Cibber. Notwithstanding, Cibber put the play on at Drury Lane with himself playing the part of Plotwell, but the play was not well received. During the staging of a different play, Cibber introduced jokes at the expense of Three Hours After Marriage, while Pope was in the audience. Pope was infuriated, as was Gay who got into a physical fight with Cibber on a subsequent visit to the theatre. Pope published a pamphlet satirising Cibber and continued his literary assault for the next 25 years.

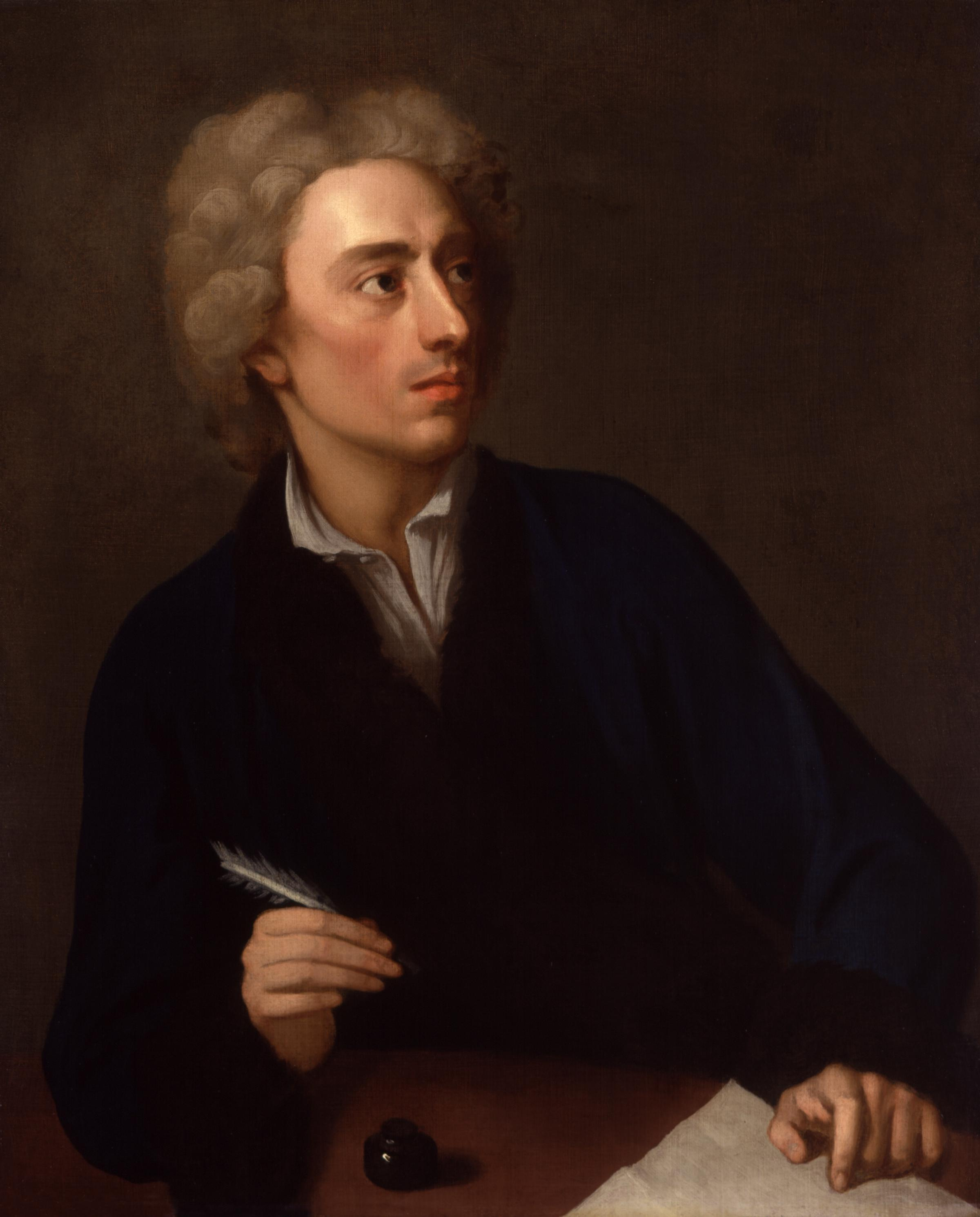
Alexander Pope made Cibber the ultimate hero of Dunciad.

In the first version of his landmark literary satire Dunciad (1728), Pope referred contemptuously to Cibber's "past, vamp'd, future, old, reviv'd, new" plays, produced with "less human genius than God gives an ape". Cibber's elevation to laureateship in 1730 further inflamed Pope against him. Cibber was selected for political reasons, as he was a supporter of the Whig government of Robert Walpole, while Pope was a Tory. The selection of Cibber for this honour was widely seen as especially cynical coming at a time when Pope, Gay, Thomson, Ambrose Philips, and Edward Young were all in their prime. As one epigram of the time put it:

In merry old England it once was a rule,
The King had his Poet, and also his Fool:
But now we're so frugal, I'd have you to know it,
That Cibber can serve both for Fool and for Poet."

Pope, mortified by the elevation of Cibber to laureateship and incredulous at what he held to be the vainglory of his Apology (1740), attacked Cibber extensively in his poetry.

Cibber replied mostly with good humour to Pope's aspersions ("some of which are in conspicuously bad taste", as Lowe points out), until 1742 when he responded in kind in "A Letter from Mr. Cibber, to Mr. Pope, inquiring into the motives that might induce him in his Satyrical Works, to be so frequently fond of Mr. Cibber's name". In this pamphlet, Cibber's most effective ammunition came from a reference in Pope's Epistle to Arbuthnot (1735) to Cibber's "whore", which gave Cibber a pretext for retorting in kind with a scandalous anecdote about Pope in a brothel. "I must own", wrote Cibber, "that I believe I know more of your whoring than you do of mine; because I don't recollect that ever I made you the least Confidence of my Amours, though I have been very near an Eye-Witness of Yours." Since Pope was around four and a half feet tall and hunchbacked due to a tubercular infection of the spine he contracted when young, Cibber regarded the prospect of Pope with a woman as something humorous, and he speaks mockingly of the "little-tiny manhood" of Pope. For once the laughers were on Cibber's side, and the story "raised a universal shout of merriment at Pope's expense". Pope made no direct reply, but took one of the most famous revenges in literary history. In the revised Dunciad that appeared in 1743, he changed his hero, the King of Dunces, from Lewis Theobald to Colley Cibber.

=== King of Dunces ===
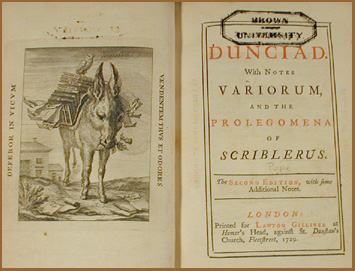
The Dunciad Variorum, 1729

The derogatory allusions to Cibber in consecutive versions of Pope's mock-heroic Dunciad, from 1728 to 1743, became more elaborate as the conflict between the two men escalated, until, in the final version of the poem, Pope crowned Cibber King of Dunces. From being merely one symptom of the artistic decay of Britain, he was transformed into the demigod of stupidity, the true son of the goddess Dulness. Apart from the personal quarrel, Pope had reasons of literary appropriateness for letting Cibber take the place of his first choice of King, Lewis Theobald. Theobald, who had embarrassed Pope by contrasting Pope's impressionistic Shakespeare edition (1725) with Theobald's own scholarly edition (1726), also wrote Whig propaganda for hire, as well as dramatic productions which were to Pope abominations for their mixing of tragedy and comedy and for their "low" pantomime and opera. However, Cibber was an even better King in these respects, more high-profile both as a political opportunist and as the powerful manager of Drury Lane, and with the crowning circumstance that his political allegiances and theatrical successes had gained him the laureateship. To Pope this made him an epitome of all that was wrong with British letters. Pope explains in the "Hyper-critics of Ricardus Aristarchus" prefatory to the 1743 Dunciad that Cibber is the perfect hero for a mock-heroic parody, since his Apology exhibits every trait necessary for the inversion of an epic hero. An epic hero must have wisdom, courage, and chivalric love, says Pope, and the perfect hero for an anti-epic therefore should have vanity, impudence, and debauchery. As wisdom, courage, and love combine to create magnanimity in a hero, so vanity, impudence, and debauchery combine to make buffoonery for the satiric hero. His revisions, however, were considered too hasty by later critics who pointed out inconsistent passages that damaged his own poem for the sake of personal vindictiveness.

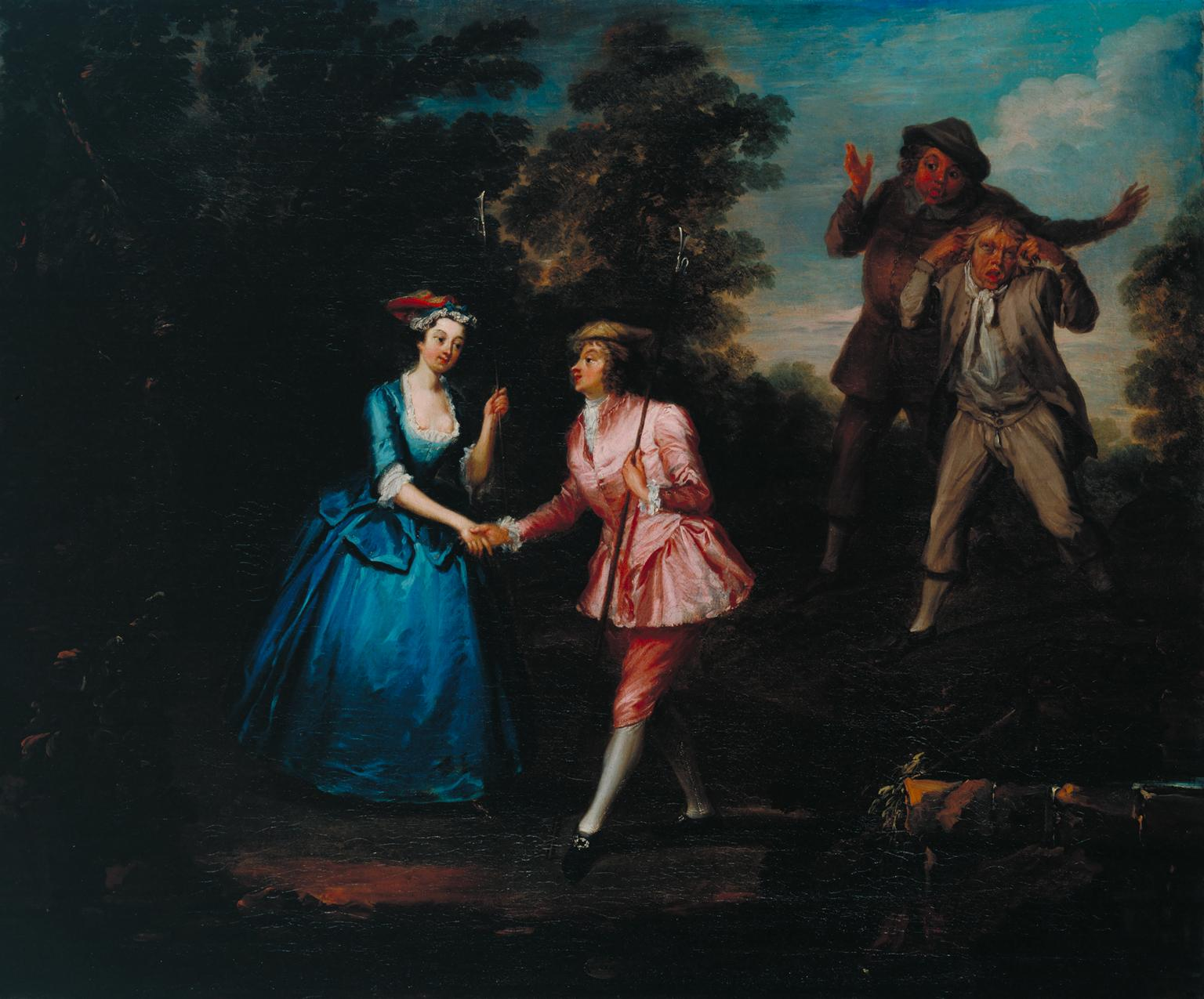
"Monstrous Medlies that have so long infested the Stage": Cibber's afterpiece / opera / pastoral farce Damon and Phillida. Charlotte Charke, Cibber's daughter, plays Damon as a breeches role.

Writing about the degradation of taste brought on by theatrical effects, Pope quotes Cibber's own confessio in the Apology:

Of that Succession of monstrous Medlies that have so long infested the Stage, and which arose upon one another alternately, at both Houses [London's two playhouses, Cibber's Drury Lane and John Rich's domain Lincoln's Inn's Fields] ... If I am ask'd (after my condemning these Fooleries myself) how I came to assent or continue my Share of Expence to them? I have no better Excuse for my Error than confessing it. I did it against my Conscience! and had not Virtue enough to starve.

Pope's notes call Cibber a hypocrite, and in general the attacks on Cibber are conducted in the notes added to the Dunciad, and not in the body of the poem. As hero of the Dunciad, Cibber merely watches the events of Book II, dreams Book III, and sleeps through Book IV.

Once Pope struck, Cibber became an easy target for other satirists. He was attacked as the epitome of morally and aesthetically bad writing, largely for the sins of his autobiography. In the Apology, Cibber speaks daringly in the first person and in his own praise. Although the major figures of the day were jealous of their fame, self-promotion of such an overt sort was shocking, and Cibber offended Christian humility as well as gentlemanly modesty. Additionally, Cibber consistently fails to see fault in his own character, praises his vices, and makes no apology for his misdeeds; so it was not merely the fact of the autobiography, but the manner of it that shocked contemporaries. His diffuse and chatty writing style, conventional in poetry and sometimes incoherent in prose, was bound to look even worse in contrast to stylists like Pope. Henry Fielding satirically tried Cibber for murder of the English language in the 17 May 1740 issue of The Champion. The Tory wits were altogether so successful in their satire of Cibber that the historical image of the man himself was almost obliterated, and it was as the King of Dunces that he came down to posterity.

In the next generation, the Grub Street journalist James Ralph—himself a target of Pope's satire in the Dunciad—took aim at Cibber's theatrical authority. In The Case of Authors by Profession or Trade, Stated (1758) he criticises the stage's claimed "infallibility," singling out Cibber as "Player, Writer, and Manager too; and, over and above, a bottle of as pert small Beer, as ever whizz'd in any Man's Face."

== Plays ==
The plays below were produced at the Theatre Royal, Drury Lane, unless otherwise stated. The dates given are of first known performance.

- Love's Last Shift or "The Fool in Fashion" (Comedy, January 1696)
- Woman's Wit (Comedy, 1697)
- Xerxes (Tragedy, Lincoln's Inn Fields, 1699)
- The Tragical History of King Richard III (Tragedy, 1699)
- Love Makes a Man or " The Fop's Fortune" (Comedy, December 1700)
- The School Boy (Comedy, advertised for 24 October 1702)
- She Would and She Would Not (Comedy, 26 November 1702)
- The Careless Husband (Comedy, 7 December 1704)
- Perolla and Izadora (Tragedy, 3 December 1705)
- The Comical Lovers (Comedy, Haymarket, 4 February 1707)
- The Double Gallant (Comedy, Haymarket, 1 November 1707)
- The Lady's Last Stake OR "The Wife's resentment" (Comedy, Haymarket, 13 December 1707)
- The Rival Fools oe "Wit, at several Weapons"(Comedy, 11 January 1709)
- The Rival Queans (Comical-Tragedy, Haymarket, 29 June 1710), a parody of Nathaniel Lee's The Rival Queens.
- Ximena or "The Heroic Daughter"(Tragedy, 28 November 1712)
- Venus and Adonis (Masque, 12 March 1715)
- Myrtillo (Pastoral, 5 November 1715)
- The Non-Juror (Comedy, 6 December 1717)
- The Refusal or " The Ladies Philosophy"(Comedy, 14 February 1721)
- Caesar in Egypt (Tragedy, 9 December 1724)
- The Provoked Husband (with Vanbrugh, comedy, 10 January 1728)
- Love in a Riddle (Pastoral, 7 January 1729)
- Damon and Phillida (Pastoral Comedy, Haymarket, 16 August 1729)
- Papal Tyranny in the Reign of King John (Tragedy, Covent Garden, 15 February 1745)

Bulls and Bears, a farce performed at Drury Lane on 2 December 1715, was attributed to Cibber but was never published. The Dramatic Works of Colley Cibber, Esq. (London, 1777) includes a play called Flora, or Hob in the Well, but it is not by Cibber. Hob, or the Country Wake. A Farce. By Mr. Doggett was attributed to Cibber by William Chetwood in his General History of the Stage (1749), but John Genest in Some Account of the English Stage (1832) thought it was by Thomas Doggett. Other plays attributed to Cibber but probably not by him include Cinna's Conspiracy, performed at Drury Lane on 19 February 1713, and The Temple of Dullness of 1745.

== Notes ==
Court offices
| Preceded by Laurence Eusden | British Poet Laureate; 1730–1757 | Succeeded by William Whitehead |
