= 1762 in literature =

This article contains information about the literary events and publications of 1762.

== Events ==
- April 27 – Rev. Hugh Blair is appointed first Professor of Rhetoric and Belles Lettres at the University of Edinburgh by King George III, the first such chair in English literature.
- June 19 – Jean-Jacques Rousseau's The Social Contract (Du Contrat social, ou Principes du droit politique) and Emile, or On Education (Émile, ou De l’éducation), recently published in Amsterdam and The Hague respectively, are publicly burned in Paris. They are also prohibited in Rousseau's native Republic of Geneva.
- June 20 – In Paris, the Comédie-Italienne, having merged with the Opéra-Comique, performs at the Hôtel de Bourgogne.
- The Sorbonne library is founded.
- The Académie française produces a new edition of its dictionary of the French language, the fourth to be published.
- Benjamin Victor's adaptation of The Two Gentlemen of Verona (with expanded roles for the clown Launce and his dog) is staged by David Garrick at Drury Lane, and runs for five nights. It is the earliest known performance of that Shakespearean play in any form.
- Christoph Martin Wieland begins publishing his prose translations of 22 Shakespearean plays, the first translations of them into German (in 8 volumes, through 1766).

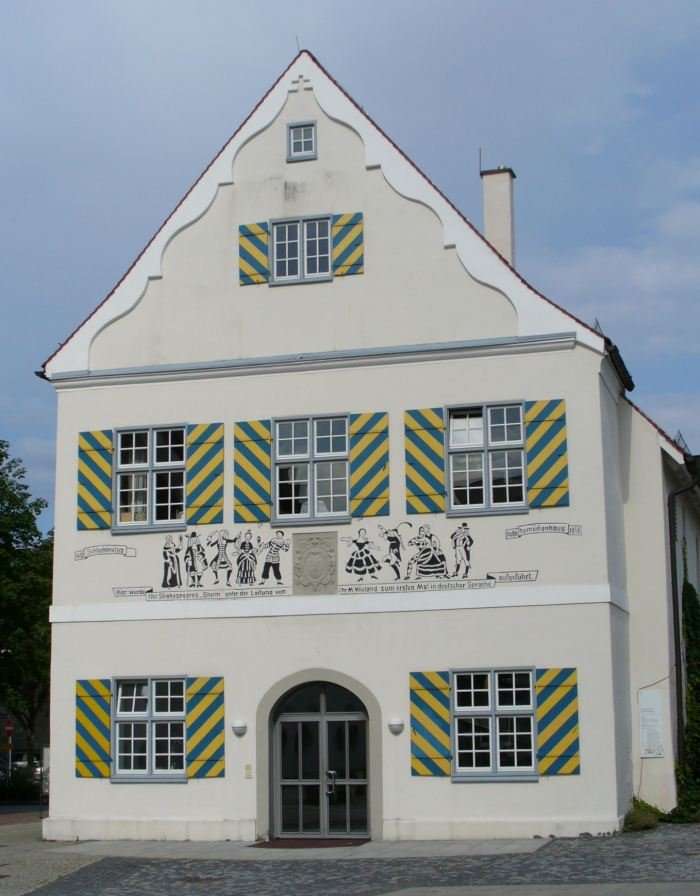
Komödienhaus in der Schlachtmetzig in Biberach an der Riss where in 1762 Shakespeare's The Tempest, translated by Christoph Wieland, is performed for the first time in Germany.

== New books ==
=== Fiction ===
- John Cleland (attributed) – The Romance of a Night
- Oliver Goldsmith – The Citizen of the World
- Charles Johnstone – The Reverie
- John Langhorne – Solyman and Almena
- Thomas Leland – Longsword, Earl of Salisbury: An Historical Romance
- Charlotte Lennox – Sophia
- Sarah Scott – Millenium Hall and the Country Adjacent
- Tobias Smollett – The Life and Adventures of Sir Launcelot Greaves
- Laurence Sterne – The Life and Opinions of Tristram Shandy, Gentleman (vols. v–vi)

=== Drama ===
- John Delap – Hecuba
- Nicolás Fernandez de Moratín – La petimetra
- Samuel Foote – The Orators
- David Garrick – Cymbeline (adapted)
- Carlo Goldoni – Le baruffe chiozzotte (The Brawl in Chioggia)
- Carlo Gozzi – Turandot
- Charlotte Lennox – The Sister
- Hannah More – The Search after Happiness ("for young ladies to act")
- William Whitehead – The School for Lovers

=== Poetry ===
- James Boswell – The Cub at Newmarket
- Elizabeth Carter – Poems on Several Occasions
- Charles Churchill – The Ghost (books i–ii)
- Mary Collier – Poems
- John Cunningham – The Contemplatist
- Tomás Antônio Gonzaga – Marília de Dirceu
- Edward Jerningham – The Nunnery
- Robert Lloyd – Poems
- James Macpherson as "Ossian" – Fingal
- William Whitehead – A Charge to the Poets
- Edward Young – Resignation

=== Non-fiction ===
- The North Briton (newspaper)
- George Campbell – A Dissertation on Miracles
- Jacques Cazotte – Ollivier.
- Denis Diderot
  - Éloge de Richardson
  - Rameau's Nephew (Le Neveu de Rameau ou La Satire seconde; completed; first published 1805)
- Nicolas Fernández de Moratín – Desengaños al teatro español
- Henry Fielding – Works
- Oliver Goldsmith
  - The Life of Richard Nash
  - The Mystery Revealed (on the Cock Lane Ghost)
- Paisiy Hilendarski – Istoriya Slavyanobolgarskaya (Slavonic-Bulgarian History)
- Henry Home – Elements of Criticism
- Richard Hurd – Letters on Chivalry and Romance
- William Kenrick – Emilius and Sophia (translation of Rousseau)
- John Langhorne – Letters on Religious Retirement, Melancholy and Enthusiasm
- Robert Lowth – A Short Introduction to English Grammar
- William Williams Pantycelyn – Llythyr Martha Philopur at y Parchedig Philo Evangelius eu hathro (Martha Philopur's letter to the Reverend Philo Evangelius, her teacher)
- John Parkhurst – An Hebrew and English Lexicon
- Joseph Priestley – A Course of Lectures on the Theory of Language, and Universal Grammar
- Jean-Jacques Rousseau
  - The Social Contract
  - Emile, or On Education
- Horace Walpole – Anecdotes of Painting in England, Volume 1

== Births ==
- January 11 – Andrew Cherry, Irish playwright and actor-manager (died 1812)
- May 19 – Johann Gottlieb Fichte, German philosopher (died 1814)
- September 11 – Joanna Baillie, Scottish poet and dramatist (died 1851)
- September 24 – William Lisle Bowles, English poet and critic (died 1850)
- October 30 – André Chénier, French poet (guillotined 1794)
- Susanna Rowson née Haswell, English-born American novelist, poet, playwright, religious writer, actress, educator and abolitionist (died 1824)

== Deaths ==
- May 26 – Alexander Gottlieb Baumgarten, German philosopher (born 1714)
- June 17 – Prosper Jolyot de Crébillon, French poet and tragedian (born 1674)
- June 26 – Luise Gottsched, German poet, comic playwright and translator (born 1713)
- August 21 – Lady Mary Wortley Montagu, English letter writer and poet (born 1698)
- October 14 – Hieronymus Pez, Austrian historian and monastic librarian (born 1685)
