= 1754 in literature =

This article contains information about the literary events and publications of 1754.

== Events ==
- January 28 – Horace Walpole, in a letter to Horace Mann, coins the word serendipity (from the Persian fairy tale The Three Princes of Serendip).
- March 2 – Riot at Smock Alley Theatre in Dublin. Thomas Sheridan, the manager, resigns, and leaves Ireland on September 15 for London where his wife Frances Sheridan meets Samuel Richardson.
- Élie Catherine Fréron's journal Lettres sur quelques écrits de ce temps is replaced by his Année littéraire.

== New books ==
=== Fiction ===
- Jane Collier and Sarah Fielding – The Cry: A New Dramatic Fable
- Mary Davys – The Reformed Coquet; or Memoirs of Amoranda
- Henry Fielding – The Life of Mr. Jonathan Wild the Great (enlarged and expanded from the Miscellanies of 1743)
- Solomon Gessner – Daphnis
- Sarah Scott:
  - Agreeable Ugliness
  - A Journey Through Every Stage of Life
- John Shebbeare – The Marriage Act

=== Poetry ===
- Thomas Cooke – An Ode on Poetry, Painting, and Sculpture
- John Duncombe – The Feminiad
- Henry Jones – The Relief
- William Whitehead – Poems

=== Non-fiction ===
- Anonymous – Critical Remarks on Sir Charles Grandison, Clarissa and Pamela
- Thomas Birch – Memoirs of the Reign of Queen Elizabeth
- Charles Bonnet – Essai de psychologie
- John Gilbert Cooper – Letters Concerning Taste
- John Douglas – Letter on the Criterion of Miracles
- John Gillies – Historical Collections Relating to Remarkable Period of the Success of the Gospel
- Zachary Grey – Critical, Historical, and Explanatory Notes on Shakespeare
- Benjamin Hoadly – Sixteen Sermons
- David Hume – The History of England (volume 1)
- William Law – The Second Part of the Spirit of Love
- Isaac Newton (died 1727) – An Historical Account of Two Notable Corruptions of Scripture (written 1690)
- Jean-Jacques Rousseau – Discourse on Inequality
- Henry St. John – Philosophical Works
- Jonathan Swift
  - Brotherly Love
  - The Works of Jonathan Swift (the Hawkesworth edition)
- William Warburton – A View of Lord Bolingbroke's Philosophy
- Thomas Warton – Observations on the Faerie Queene of Spenser

== Drama ==
- Samuel Crisp – Virginia
- David Garrick – Catharine and Petruchio (adapted from The Taming of the Shrew)
- John Gay – The Rehearsal at Goatham
- Macnamara Morgan:
  - Philoclea (from Sir Philip Sidney's Arcadia)
  - The Sheep-Shearing, or Florizel and Perdita (a farce adapted from The Winter's Tale)
- Prosper Jolyot de Crébillon – Le Triumvirat
- William Whitehead – Creusa, Queen of Athens

== Births ==
- March 24 – Joel Barlow, American poet and diplomat (died 1812)
- May 23 – William Drennan, Irish physician, poet, radical and educationalist (died 1820)
- July 11 – Thomas Bowdler, English editor (died 1825)
- August 2 – Lady Charlotte Murray, English writer and botanist (died 1808)
- October 13 – Frances Jacson, English novelist (died 1842)
- December 24 – George Crabbe, English poet (died 1832)
- unknown date – John Caradja, Greek Prince of Wallachia, translator and theatrical promoter (died 1844)

== Deaths ==
- January 11 – Wu Jingzi, Chinese scholar and novelist (born 1701)
- January 28 – Ludvig Holberg, Norwegian philosopher, historian and playwright (born 1684)
- April 2 – Thomas Carte, English historian (born 1686)
- April 9 – Christian Wolff, German philosopher (born 1679)
- October 8 – Henry Fielding English novelist (born 1707)
- November 12 – Robert Morris, English architect and writer on architecture (born 1703)
