= Edward Berry (actor) =

British stage actor

Edward Berry (1706-1760) was a British stage actor. He was a long-standing member of the Drury Lane company, appearing frequently with David Garrick.

== Selected roles ==
- Hobinol in The Village Opera by Charles Johnson (1729)
- Pantomine in Bayes's Opera by Gabriel Odingsells (1730)
- Butler in The Devil to Pay by Charles Coffey (1731)
- Gentleman in Caelia by Charles Johnson (1732)
- Sparke in The Miser by Henry Fielding (1733)
- Valeius Publicola in Junius Brutus by William Duncombe (1734)
- Don Lopez in Trick for Trick by Robert Fabian (1735)
- Osmyn in The Christian Hero by George Lillo (1735)
- Chatillon in Zara by Aaron Hill (1736)
- Byron in The Universal Passion by James Miller (1737)
- Ceron in The Fatal Retirement by Anthony Brown (1739)
- Manilus in Regulus by William Havard (1744)
- Siftem in The Astrologer by James Ralph (1744)
- Cardinal Perigot in Edward the Black Prince by William Shirley (1750)
- Philip in The Brothers by Edward Young (1753)
- Xuthus in Creusa, Queen of Athens by William Whitehead (1754)

== Bibliography ==
- Highfill, Philip H, Burnim, Kalman A. & Langhans, Edward A. A Biographical Dictionary of Actors, Actresses, Musicians, Dancers, Managers, and Other Stage Personnel in London, 1660-1800: Volume 2. SIU Press, 1975.
- Marshall, Gail & Kishi, Tetsuo. Lives of Shakespearian Actors, Volume 1. Pickering & Chatto, 2008.
