= The Beggar's Wedding =

1729 ballad opera

- Original language: English
- Written by: Charles Coffey
- Genre: Comedy

Premiere
- Date: 24 March 1729
- Place: Smock Alley Theatre

The Beggar's Wedding is a 1729 ballad opera by the Irish writer Charles Coffey. Part of a boom in ballad operas following the success of John Gay's The Beggar's Opera, it originally premiered at the Smock Alley Theatre in Dublin in March 1729 before appearing in London at the Haymarket Theatre on 29 May 1729 The original Dublin cast included Richard Elrington.

== Bibliography ==
- Burling, William J. A Checklist of New Plays and Entertainments on the London Stage, 1700-1737. Fairleigh Dickinson Univ Press, 1992.
- Greene, John C. & Clark, Gladys L. H. The Dublin Stage, 1720-1745: A Calendar of Plays, Entertainments, and Afterpiece. Lehigh University Press, 1993.
- Nicoll, Allardyce. A History of Early Eighteenth Century Drama: 1700-1750. CUP Archive, 1927.
