= Le diable à quatre (opera) =

Opera by Christoph Willibald Gluck

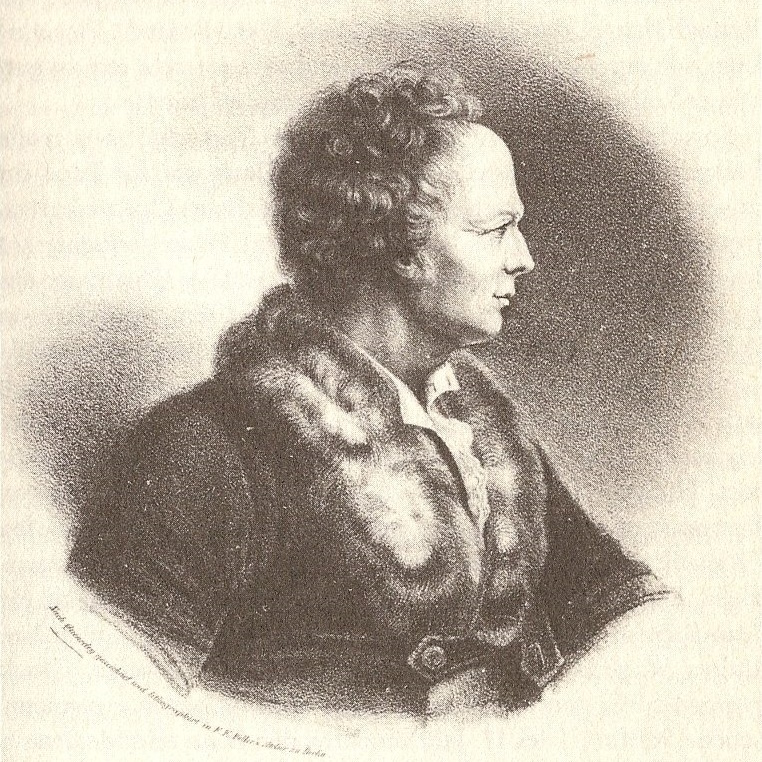
Portrait of Christoph Willibald Gluck, ca. 1750

Le diable à quatre (The Devil to Pay) is an opéra comique in three acts by Christoph Willibald Gluck. The French-language libretto is by Michel-Jean Sedaine and Pierre Baurans, after a translation by Claude-Pierre Patu of the 1731 ballad opera by Charles Coffey entitled The Devil to Pay, or The Wives Metamorphos’d. It was first performed at Laxenburg on May 28, 1759. The work was a popular success. Joseph Haydn used a melody from it, "Je n’aimais pas le tabac beaucoup (I didn’t like tobacco much)" in the first movement of his symphony Le soir.

Klaus Hortschansky has noted that Le diable à quatre is one of Gluck's few stageworks where the composer neither used musical material from prior works nor recycled material from it into future works. Bruce Brown has discussed Gluck's authorship of the music in detail, and has also edited the work for the Gluck Sämtliche Werke.

(The same libretto was set to music arranged by Andre Danican Philidor and Jean-Louis Laruette and first staged with the above title on 19 August 1756 in Paris.)

== Roles ==
Role	Voice type	Premiere Cast, (Conductor:)
The Marquise	soprano	
The Marquis	tenor	
Margot	soprano	
Jacques, a cobbler, Margot's husband	baritone	
An astrologer	tenor	

== Synopsis ==
The story concerns an ill-natured Marquise. An astrologer, to whom she had refused shelter at her chateau, transforms her into the wife of a surly cobbler named Jacques and transforms the cobbler's sweet-natured wife into the Marquise. After the Marquise learns her lesson, the astrologer reverses the spell.
