= Dennis Delane =

Irish actor

Dennis Delane (died April 1750) was an Irish stage actor who appeared for many years at the leading London theatres.

== Beginnings in Dublin ==
Delane was educated at Trinity College, Dublin and originally intended to become a lawyer. His first appearance as an actor took place about 1728 at the Smock Alley Theatre, Dublin, then under the management of Thomas Elrington. Delane supported successfully a large round of characters in tragedy and comedy, his principal parts being Alexander in Lee's ‘Rival Queens’ and Young Bevil in the ‘Conscious Lovers’ of Richard Steele.

== Move to London ==
High terms were offered him by Henry Giffard for London, and he opened at Goodman's Fields in 1730, presumably 24 November, as Chamont in The Orphan. His success was conspicuous and immediate. During the four years in which he remained at Goodman's Fields he played in rapid succession Othello, Orestes, Oroonoko, Hotspur, Ghost in Hamlet, Richard III, Brutus, Macbeth, Lear, Cato, and very many other roles. On 25 September 1735 he appeared as Alexander at Covent Garden, when he added to his repertory Antony, Lothario, Falstaff, King John, Jaffier, Richard II, Henry V, Volpone, Herod, and others. Six years later, 28 December 1741, he is found playing Richard III at Drury Lane, where subsequently he took Comus, Shylock, Hamlet, Bajazet, Faulconbridge, Silvio in John Fletcher's Women Pleased, and others, and created the characters of Mahomet in James Miller's adaptation of Voltaire's tragedy (25 April 1744), Osmond in Thomson's Tancred and Sigismunda (18 March 1745), and King Henry in Macklin's King Henry the VII; or, The Popish Impostor (18 January 1746).

== Later years ==
On 17 October 1748 as Hotspur he returned to Covent Garden, where he remained until his death, which is mentioned in the ‘General Advertiser’ of 3 April 1750 as having taken place 'on Saturday night', that is, on 29 March 1750.

== Selected roles ==
- Amurat in Scanderbeg by William Havard (1733)
- Weldon in Love the Cause and Cure of Grief by Thomas Cooke (1743)
- Corvus in Regulus by William Havard (1744)
- Mahomet in Mahomet the Imposter by James Miller (1744)
- Osmond in Tancred and Sigismunda by James Thomson (1745)

== Bibliography ==
- Highfill, Philip H, Burnim, Kalman A. & Langhans, Edward A. A Biographical Dictionary of Actors, Actresses, Musicians, Dancers, Managers, and Other Stage Personnel in London, 1660-1800: West to Zwingman. SIU Press, 1973.

== Sources ==
This article incorporates text from a publication now in the public domain: Knight, John Joseph (1888). "Delane, Dennis". In Stephen, Leslie (ed.). Dictionary of National Biography. Vol. 14. London: Smith, Elder & Co.
