= Delane =

Delane may refer to:

- DeLane Fitzgerald, American football coach in the United States
- DeLane Matthews (born 1961), American actress
- Dennis Delane (died 1750), Irish actor
- John Thadeus Delane (1817–1879), editor of The Times (London), born in London
- Mansoor Delane (born 2003), American football player
