= Longsword (disambiguation) =

A longsword is a type of European two-handed sword.

Longsword may also refer to:

== People ==
- William Longsword (893–942), the second ruler of Normandy
- William of Winchester, Lord of Lunenburg (1184–1213), or William Longsword
- William Longespée, 3rd Earl of Salisbury (1176–1226) ("Long Sword")

== Other uses ==
- Long Sword dance, an English hilt-and-point sword dance
- Longsword (novel), a 1762 work by the Irish writer Thomas Leland
