= A Wife and No Wife =

1724 play

- Written by: Charles Coffey
- Original language: English
- Genre: Comedy

Premiere
- Date premiered: January 1724
- Place premiered: Smock Alley Theatre

A Wife and No Wife is a 1724 comedy play by the Irish writer Charles Coffey. It premiered at the Smock Alley Theatre in Dublin. The original cast included Richard Elrington and Thomas Hallam.

== Bibliography ==
- Greene, John C. & Clark, Gladys L. H. The Dublin Stage, 1720-1745: A Calendar of Plays, Entertainments, and Afterpiece. Lehigh University Press, 1993.
