= Mahomet (play) =

Play by Voltaire

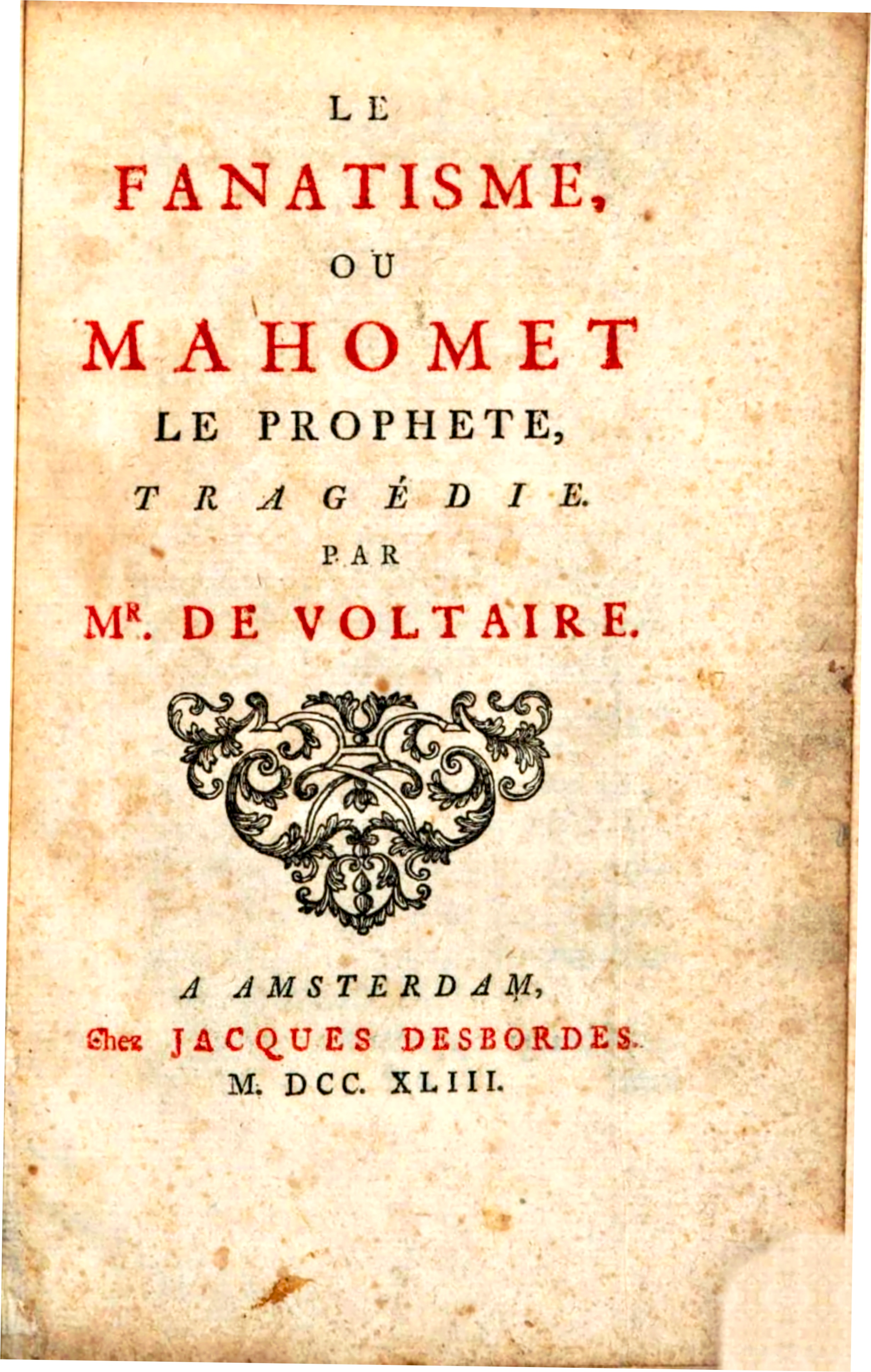
- Frontispiece of the 1753 edition
- Original language: French
- Written by: Voltaire
- Characters: Mahomet, founder of Islam; Zopir, leader of Mecca; Omar, general and lieutenant to Mahomet; Seid, Zopir's son, abducted and enslaved by Mahomet; Palmira, Zopir's daughter, abducted and enslaved by Mahomet; Phanor, senator of Mecca; Meccan tribes Mahomet's followers
- Subject: Religious fanaticism
- Genre: Tragedy

Premiere
- Date: 25 April 1741
- Place: Lille, France

Mahomet (French: Le fanatisme, ou Mahomet le Prophète, literally Fanaticism, or Mahomet the Prophet) is a five-act tragedy written in 1736 by French playwright and philosopher Voltaire. It received its debut performance in Lille on 25 April 1741.

The play is a study of religious fanaticism and self-serving manipulation based on an episode in the fictional biography of Muhammad, in which he orders the murder of his critics. Voltaire described the play as "written in opposition to the founder of a false and barbarous sect".

== Plot summary ==
The story of Mahomet unfolds during Muhammad's post-exile siege of Mecca in 629 AD, when the opposing forces are under a short-term truce called to discuss the terms and course of the war.

In the first act the audience is introduced to a fictional leader of the Meccans, Zopir, an ardent and defiant advocate of free will and liberty who rejects Mahomet. Mahomet is presented through his conversations with his second in command Omar and with his opponent Zopir and with two of Zopir's long-lost children (Seid and Palmira), whom, unbeknownst to Zopir, Mahomet had abducted and enslaved in their infancy, fifteen years earlier.

The now young and beautiful captive Palmira has become the object of Mahomet's desires and jealousy. Having observed a growing affection between Palmira and Seid, Mahomet devises a plan to steer Seid away from her heart by indoctrinating young Seid in religious fanaticism and sending him on a suicide attack to assassinate Zopir in Mecca, an event which he hopes will rid him of both Zopir and Seid and free Palmira's affections for his own conquest. Mahomet invokes divine authority to justify his conduct.

Seid, still respectful of Zopir's nobility of character, hesitates at first about carrying out his assignment, but eventually his fanatical loyalty to Mahomet overtakes him and he slays Zopir. Phanor arrives and reveals to Seid and Palmira to their disbelief that Zopir was their father. Omar arrives and deceptively orders Seid arrested for Zopir's murder, despite knowing that it was Mahomet who had ordered the assassination. Mahomet decides to cover up the whole event so as to not be seen as the deceitful impostor and tyrant that he is.

Having now uncovered Mahomet's vile deception, Palmira renounces Mahomet's God and commits suicide rather than fall into the clutches of Mahomet.

== Analysis and inspiration ==
The play is a direct assault on the moral character of Muhammad. Omar is a known historical figure who became second caliph; the characters of Seid and Palmira represent Muhammad's adopted son Zayd ibn Harithah and his wife Zaynab bint Jahsh, though in no way their life resembles the characters.

Pierre Milza posits that it may have been "the intolerance of the Catholic Church and its crimes done on behalf of the Christ" that were targeted by the philosopher. Voltaire's own statement about it in a letter in 1742 was quite vague: "I tried to show in it into what horrible excesses fanaticism, led by an impostor, can plunge weak minds." It is only in another letter dated from the same year that he explains that this plot is an implicit reference to Jacques Clément, the monk who assassinated Henri III in 1589.

== Reception ==
Voltaire sent a copy of the play to Pope Benedict XIV, with a couplet in Latin and a request for two holy medals. The Pope had the medals sent, as well as a reply in which he thanked him for his "very beautiful tragedy of Mahomet" and discussed the grammar of his couplet. Voltaire had this correspondence published in every future edition of the play, which aided its publicity.

Napoleon, during his captivity on Saint Helena, criticised Voltaire's Mahomet, and said Voltaire had made him merely an impostor and a tyrant, without representing him as a "great man":

Mahomet was the subject of deep criticism. 'Voltaire', said the Emperor, 'in the character and conduct of his hero, has departed both from nature and history. He has degraded Mahomet, by making him descend to the lowest intrigues. He has represented a great man, who changed the face of the world, acting like a scoundrel, worthy of the gallows. He has no less absurdly travestied the character of Omar, which he has drawn like that of a cut-throat in a melo-drama.'

An 1881 revival in Paris was officially protested by the Ottoman Turkish ambassador.

In 2005, a reading of the play in Saint-Genis-Pouilly, Ain, France, resulted in demands for cancellation and street disturbances outside the performance itself. Under pressure to cancel the play, the Mayor allowed the play to continue despite "street disturbances" from Muslim groups. "Mayor Bertrand says he is proud his town took a stand by refusing to cave in under pressure to call off the reading. Free speech is modern Europe's 'foundation stone', he says. 'For a long time we have not confirmed our convictions, so lots of people think they can contest them.'"

== Translations into English ==
There are four known translations of the play into English:

- James Miller's Mahomet the Imposter, completed by John Hoadly, first performed 1744, published by A. Donaldson, 1759 (technically an adaptation, rather than a translation)
- The translation by E. P. Dupont publishers (New York, 1901)
- The translation by Robert L. Myers, published by Frederick Ungar, 1964
- The translation by Hannah Burton, published by Litwin Books, 2013
