= John Sowdon =

Irish stage actor

John Sowdon (died 1789) was an Irish stage actor, singer and theater manager in the eighteenth century.

His origins are a matter of dispute with one source claiming he was the brother of the owner of Castle Otway while George Anne Bellamy claimed he was the son of a horse milliner.

He is likely to have made his London stage debut at Covent Garden as Pierce in Venice Preserved on 4 December 1747. A year later, he played part in Othello and Richard III. He was a member of the Drury Lane company between 1748 and 1752. Sowdon was then employed at the Smock Alley Theatre, Ireland's leading playhouse, in Dublin. An stated that Sowdon accepted this contract with hopes that he would become joint manager of the theater. He briefly co-managed the theatre with Benjamin Victor after Thomas Sheridan left for England, and was primarily known for playing Othello at the time. In 1758 he sold his share in Smock Alley to Spranger Barry and appeared at the Crow Street Theatre. 1762 was his last season in Dublin, and in the autumn of that year he acted at the Theatre Royal in Cork.

In 1767 he joined Samuel Foote's company at the Haymarket Theatre where he remained for three years. His final known appearance was at the Theatre Royal, Edinburgh in 1771

== Selected roles ==
- Othello in Othello (1748)
- Banquo in Macbeth (1748)
- Tamerlane in Tamerlane (1748)
- Mustapha in Irene (1749)
- Tullius Hostilius in The Roman Father (1750)
- King John in Edward the Black Prince (1750)
- Gloster in Jane Shore (1750)
- Don Gabriel in Gil Blas (1751)
- Sir Jacob in The Mayor of Garret (1767)
- Grey in The Countess of Salisbury (1767)
- Friendly in Doctor Last in his Chariot (1769)

== Bibliography ==
- Highfill, Philip H, Burnim, Kalman A. & Langhans, Edward A. A Biographical Dictionary of Actors, Actresses, Musicians, Dancers, Managers, and Other Stage Personnel in London, 1660–1800: Garrick to Gyngell. SIU Press, 1978.
