= Edward Moore (dramatist) =

English dramatist and writer

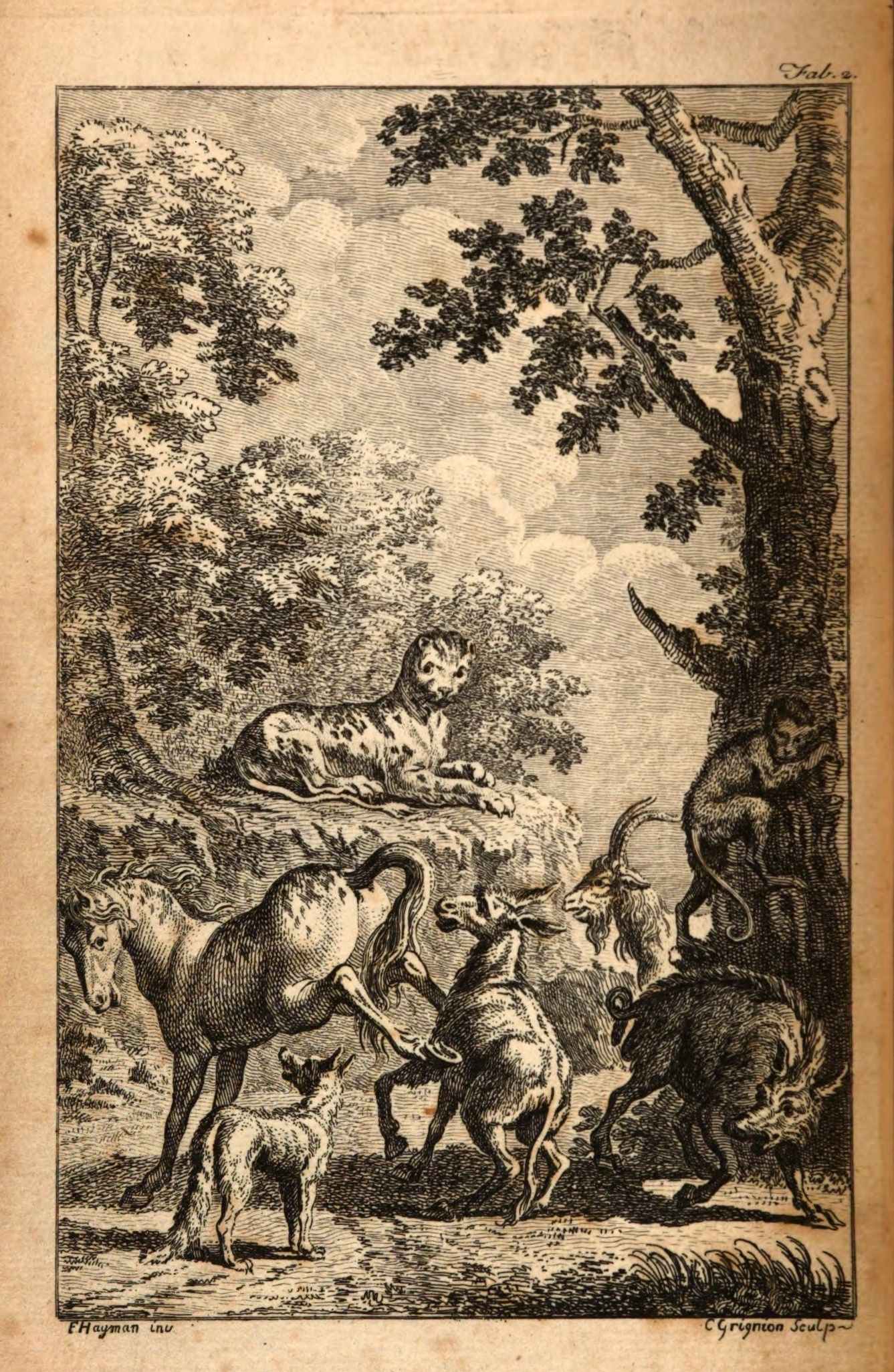
Fables for the Female Sex (1744) is illustrated with engravings by Charles Grignion the Elder after Francis Hayman

Edward Moore (22 March 1712 – 1 March 1757), English dramatist and miscellaneous writer, the son of a dissenting minister, was born at Abingdon, Berkshire.

He was the author of Fables for the Female Sex (1744), The Trial of Selim the Persian (1748), The Foundling (1748) and Gil Blas (1751). He wrote the domestic tragedy of The Gamester, originally produced in 1753 with David Garrick in the leading character of Beverley the gambler. It is upon The Gamester that Moore's literary reputation rests; the play was much-produced in England and the United States in the century after Moore's death. The oft-quoted phrase "rich beyond the dreams of avarice" is spoken by Mrs. Beverley in the play's second act.

As a poet he produced clever imitations of John Gay and Thomas Gray, and with the assistance of Lord Lyttelton, Lord Chesterfield and Horace Walpole, conducted The World (1753–1757), a weekly periodical on the model of the Rambler. He collected his poems under the title of Poems, Fables and Plays in 1756.

Moore died in Lambeth on 1 March 1757. His Dramatic Works were published in 1788.
