= Love the Cause and Cure of Grief =

1743 play

- Original language: English
- Written by: Thomas Cooke
- Genre: Tragedy

Premiere
- Date: 19 December 1743
- Place: Theatre Royal, Drury Lane, London

Love the Cause and Cure of Grief is a 1743 tragedy by the British writer Thomas Cooke. It is a revised version of Cooke's earlier published but unperformed play The Mournful Nuptials.

It premiered at the Theatre Royal, Drury Lane with a cast that included Dennis Delane as Weldon, Henry Giffard as Briar, William Havard as Young Freeman, Richard Winstone as Judge and Anna Marcella Giffard as Charlotte.

== Bibliography ==
- Baines, Paul & Ferarro, Julian & Rogers, Pat. The Wiley-Blackwell Encyclopedia of Eighteenth-Century Writers and Writing, 1660-1789. Wiley-Blackwell, 2011.
- Watson, George. The New Cambridge Bibliography of English Literature: Volume 2, 1660–1800. Cambridge University Press, 1971.
