= The Devil of a Wife =

1686 play

- Original language: English
- Written by: Thomas Jevon
- Genre: Restoration Comedy

Premiere
- Date: March 1686
- Place: Dorset Garden Theatre, London

The Devil of a Wife, or A Comical Transformation is a 1686 comedy play by the English writer and actor Thomas Jevon. It was first performed by the United Company at the Dorset Garden Theatre in London.

The original Dorset Garden cast included Philip Griffin as Sir Richard Lovemore, John Bowman as Rowland, Carey Perin as Longmore, Richard Saunders as Butler, Thomas Percival as Cook, Henry Norris as The Ladies Father, George Powell as Noddy, Thomas Jevon as Jobson, John Freeman as Doctor, Sarah Cooke as Lady Lovemore, Emily Price as Jane, Susanna Percival as Nell.

In 1724 the play was revived at the Lincoln's Inn Fields Theatre with a cast featuring John Ogden, William Bullock and Jane Egleton. In 1731 it was adapted into a ballad opera The Devil to Pay, following the fashion for musical plays by The Beggar's Opera.

== Plot ==
Jobson, a weaver, routinely abuses his kind wife, Nell. Jobson attends a raucous party run by Sir Richard Lovemore, but the proceedings are disrupted by Lovemore's peevish and controlling wife, Lady Lovemore, who considers such events sinful now that she has come under the influence of a preacher who frequents the Lovemores' house. Sir Richard's servants devise a scheme to pretend to be demons in order to scare the preacher (who is staying with the Lovemores) and are successful in their endeavors. Meanwhile, after being rudely addressed by Lady Lovemore, a doctor resolves to cast a spell that makes Lady Lovemore appear to the world as Nell, and Nell as Lady Lovemore. The next morning the women wake up in the beds of the other's spouse. The doctor decides to rescind the spell; by that point Lady Lovemore's treatment of Jobson has taught him to appreciate his wife, and Jobson's behavior towards Lady Lovemore has made her attitude gentler.

== Bibliography ==
- Canfield, J. Douglas: Tricksters and Estates: On the Ideology of Restoration Comedy (Lexington: University Press of Kentucky, 2014).
- Van Lennep, W.: The London Stage, 1660–1800: Volume One, 1660–1700 (Carbondale: Southern Illinois University Press, 1960).
- Jevon, Thomas.The Devil of a Wife, or a Comical Transformation. Printed for James Knapton at the Crown in St. Paul's Churchyard, 1691.
