= Mahomet the Imposter =

1744 play

- Written by: James Miller
- Original language: English
- Genre: Tragedy

Premiere
- Date premiered: 25 April 1744
- Place premiered: Theatre Royal, Drury Lane

Mahomet the Imposter is a 1744 tragedy by the British writer James Miller. His final play, it was inspired by the 1736 French work Mahomet by Voltaire. It was Miller's only tragedy, as his other works were sentimental comedies. The title is sometimes spelt as Mahomet the Impostor.

The original Drury Lane cast included David Garrick as Zaphna, Dennis Delane as Mahomet, Henry Giffard as Alcanor, Richard Winstone as Pharon and Anna Marcella Giffard as Palmira.

== Bibliography ==
- Nicoll, Allardyce. A History of Early Eighteenth Century Drama: 1700-1750. CUP Archive, 1927.
