= Andrew Cherry =

Irish writer (1762–1812)

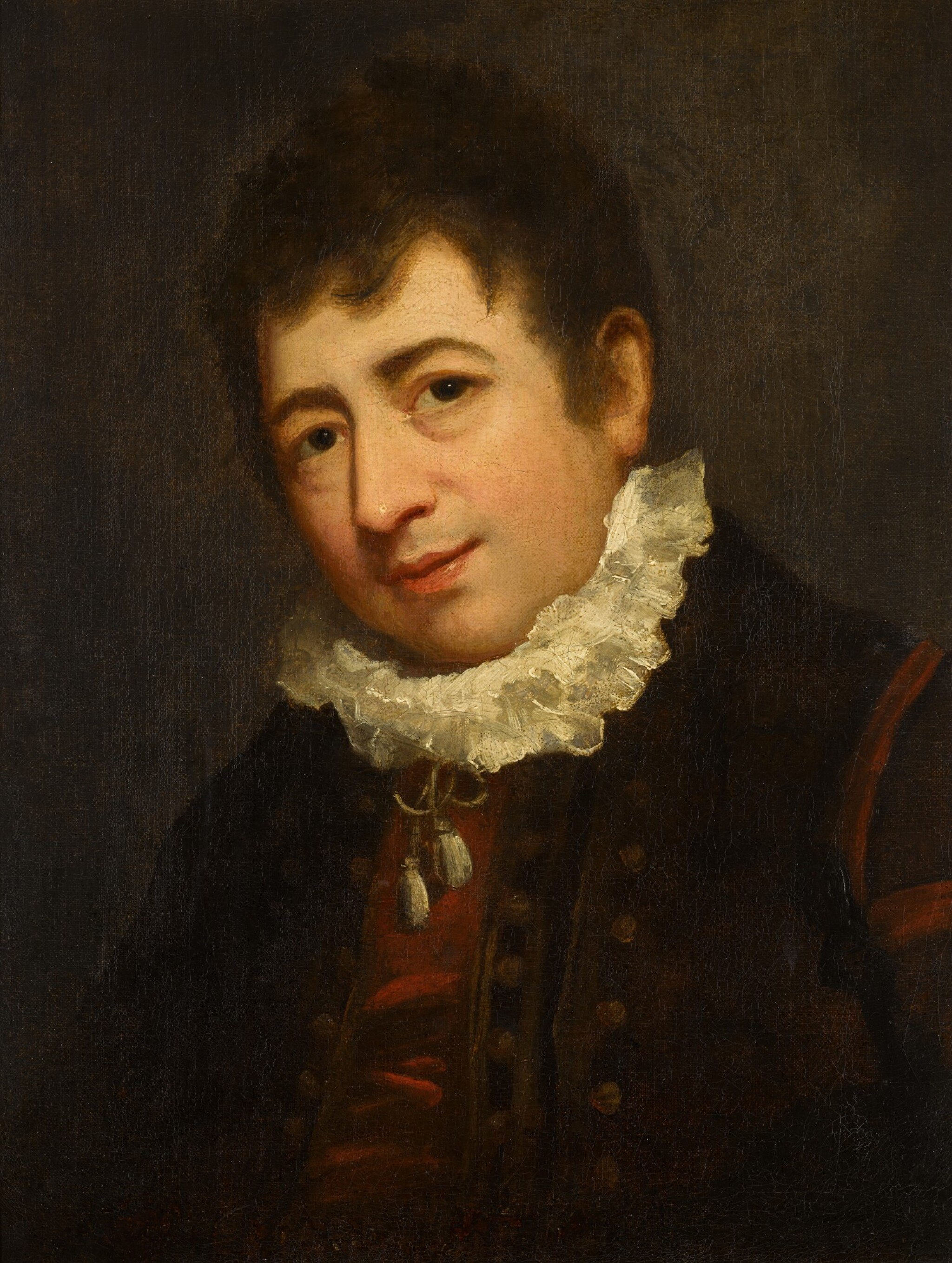
- Andrew Cherry as Lazarillo, painted by James Saxon
- Born: 11 January 1762; Limerick, County Limerick, Ireland
- Died: 12 February 1812 (aged 50); Monmouth, Monmouthshire, United Kingdom
- Occupations: actor; playwright

Andrew Cherry (11 January 1762 – 12 February 1812) was an Irish dramatist, songwriter, actor and theatre manager.

== Life ==
He was born in Limerick on 11 January 1762. His father, John Cherry, a printer and bookseller in Limerick, is said to hare intended him for the church. At eleven years of age, however, Cherry left the Limerick from school and entered the employment of James Potts, a printer and bookseller in Dublin.

From an early period, he displayed a taste for the stage, and at the age of fourteen he played as an amateur, in a room at the Black-a-Moor's Head, Towers Street, Dublin, Lucia in Addison's Cato. Three years later be first appeared at Naas, county Kildare, as a member of a strolling company under the management of a Mr. Martin, playing Feignwell in A Bold Stroke for s Wife. As a strolling player in Ireland, he purchased, at the cost of constant exposure and imminent risk of starvation, a fair knowledge of his art. According to the accounts of his career published during his lifetime, he was on one occasion three days without food. Yielding to discouragement he returned to his former occupation and remained in Dublin for three years. After one or two attempts to resume his profession of an actor he joined the company of Richard William Knipe, a well-known and popular manager, whose daughter, after the death of her father, he married in Belfast. Cherry then joined the 'principal provincial company of Ireland' under the management of Atkins, and played with an increasing reputation in the north of Ireland a round of leading characters. Mr. Ryder having in 1787 been engaged for Covent Garden, Mr. Cherry was called up to supply his place at the Theatre Royal, Smock Alley, Dublin. As Ryder's first appearance took place on 25 October 1766, this data is seen to be not wholly trustworthy.

For five or six years Cherry, familiarly known as 'Little Cherry,' enjoyed a high reputation in Dublin. His first part in the Smock Alley Theatre was Darby in the Poor Soldier of O'Keefe. Early in the season of 1791–2, he appeared with his wife in Hull as a member of the company of Tate Wilkinson, playing comic characters previously assigned to Fawcett, who had just quit the York circuit for Covent Garden. He first appeared as a member of Wilkinson's troupe at Wakefield as Vapid in the Dramatist, and Lamrillo in Jephson's Two Strings to your Bow. In the spring of 1794, Cherry, irritated that Fawcett, then on a starring tour, resumed his old parts, threw up his engagement with Tale Wilkinson and returned to Dublin, where he continued for two seasons, after which, with his wife, he engaged with Ward and Banks at the Theatre Royal, Manchester. Thence, to replace Blisset, he proceeded to Bath, in which city he made his first appearance on 6 October 1798.

From Bath, he made his way to Drury Lane, at which house he appeared for the first time on 25 September 1802 as Sir Benjamin Dove in the Brothers of Cumberland, and Lazarillo in Two Strings to your Bow. At this house, at which one or two of his pieces were produced, he stayed until 1807, after which his name disappeared from the bills. A few years subsequently he was managing a theatrical company in Wales.

By his wife, Cherry had a large family. He died at Monmouth in February 1812.

== Assessment ==
Genest was unfavourably impressed with Cherry as an actor.

On the other hand, Tate Wilkinson says that in certain characters "he possesses great merit," and adds that he

has the peculiar excellence as a comedian that when he has to perform a character not so suited to his genius and abilities, yet still it is not Cherry, but the character justly conceived, that you perceive the skill of the artist perhaps more when he is out of his walk than when in.

Among some manuscript notes to the 'Account of the English Stage' by Genest believed to be by the late George Daniel, appear the following observations a propos to one of Genest's sneers (vii. 565):

This is a very ill-natured and untrue remark. as it is well known that Cherry was exceedingly clever and gave the greatest satisfaction both to the Yorkshire manager [Tate Wilkinson] and the public.

== Works ==
Cherry is said to have written:

- Harlequin on the Stocks, pantomime, 1793, produced at the Hull Theatre for his benefit. 1793.
- The Outcasts, opera, 1796 (not printed).
- The Soldier's Daughter, comedy, 8vo, 1804, acted at Drury Lane on 7 Feb. 1804.
- All for Fame, comic sketch, not printed, recited at Drury Lane on 15 May 1805 for the benefit of Mrs. Mountain.
- The Village, or the World's Epitome, comedy, never printed, acted at the Haymarket on 18 July 1805, and withdrawn after the second representation.
- The Travellers, operatic drama, music by Corri, 8vo, 1806, performed with success at Drury Lane on 22 Jan. 1806.
- Thalia’s Tears, a sketch to the memory of King, Drury Lane, 7 Feb. 1806, not printed.
- Spanish Dollars, a ‘musical trifle,’ Covent Garden, 9 April 1805, music by Dav.
- Peter the Great, or the Wooden Walls, 8vo, 1807. acted at Covent Garden on 8 May 1807, music by Jouve.
- A Day in London, comedy, acted at Drury Lane on 9 April 1807 and not printed.

Some of these plays are included in the known collections of Uxberry, Cumberland, and Duncombe, or in the ‘London Stage.’

== Sources ==
- Joseph Knight; rev. John Wells (2004). "Cherry, Andrew (1762–1812)". Oxford Dictionary of National Biography. Oxford Dictionary of National Biography (online ed.). Oxford University Press. doi:10.1093/ref:odnb/5222. (Subscription, Wikipedia Library access or UK public library membership required.)
- Much of the material in this article previously appeared as 'Andrew Cherry, Actor and Dramatist' in The Era, 1 January 1881, p. 15, following the death of Miss Harriet Talbot Cherry, aged 83, Andrew Cherry's daughter.
