= The Universal Passion =

1737 play

- Original language: English
- Written by: James Miller
- Genre: Comedy

Premiere
- Date: 28 February 1737
- Place: Theatre Royal, Drury Lane

The Universal Passion is a 1737 comedy play by the British writer James Miller. It is a reworking of Shakespeare's Much Ado About Nothing.

The original Drury Lane cast included William Milward as Gratiano, William Mills as Bellario, James Quin as Protheus, Theophilus Cibber as Joculo, Edward Berry as Byron, Richard Winstone as Gremio, John Harper as Porco, Charles Macklin as Asino, Kitty Clive as Liberia and Hannah Pritchard as Delia.

== Bibliography ==
- Burling, William J. A Checklist of New Plays and Entertainments on the London Stage, 1700-1737. Fairleigh Dickinson Univ Press, 1992.
- Findlay, Allison. Much Ado About Nothing. Macmillan, 2011.
- Nicoll, Allardyce. History of English Drama, 1660-1900, Volume 2. Cambridge University Press, 2009.
