= The Brothers (Young play) =

Play by Edward Young

- Original language: English
- Written by: Edward Young
- Genre: Tragedy

Premiere
- Date: 3 March 1753
- Place: Theatre Royal, Drury Lane

The Brothers is a tragedy by the British writer Edward Young.

Written in 1728, the play was about to be staged and was in rehearsals when Young was appointed chaplain to George II and withdrew it in case his playwrighting might offend the King.

It was not performed until 1753, when David Garrick produced it at the Drury Lane Theatre. The cast included Garrick as Demetrius, Henry Mossop as Perseus, Edward Berry as Philip, Richard Winstone as Posthumius, George Anne Bellamy as Erixine, Jane Green as the Attendant and Thomas Mozeen as Curtius. The epilogue was by Kitty Clive.

== Bibliography ==
- Kahan, Jeffrey. Shakespeare Imitations, Parodies and Forgeries, 1710-1820, Volume 1. Taylor & Francis, 2004.
- Nicoll, Allardyce. History of English Drama, 1660-1900, Volume 2. Cambridge University Press, 2009.
