= Edward the Black Prince (play) =

Play by William Shirley

- Original language: English
- Written by: William Shirley
- Genre: History

Premiere
- Date: 6 January 1750
- Place: Theatre Royal, Drury Lane

Edward the Black Prince is a 1750 historical play by the British writer William Shirley. Written in the style of Shakespeare, it portrays the life of Edward the Black Prince an English leader in the Hundred Years War and father of Richard II.

The original Drury Lane cast included David Garrick as Edward, Spranger Barry as Lord Ribemont, Edward Berry as Cardinal Perigot, John Sowdon as King John, William Havard as Arnold, Richard Winstone as Charney, Thomas King as Duke of Athens and John Palmer as Audley.

== Bibliography ==
- Nicoll, Allardyce. A History of Early Eighteenth Century Drama: 1700-1750. CUP Archive, 1927.
