= William Grimaldi =

English painter (1751–1830)

William Grimaldi (1751–1830) was an English miniature painter.

== Life ==
Born in the parish of St Leonard's, Shoreditch, on 26 August 1751, he was son of Alexander Grimaldi and Esther Barton his wife, and great-grandson of Alessandro Maria Grimaldi, the heir and representative of the Genoese family of Grimaldi, who had settled in England after the bombardment of Genoa in 1684. Grimaldi was nephew of Thomas Worlidge, to whom in 1764 he was bound apprentice for seven years. He remained with Mrs. Worlidge after his uncle's death, and assisted in the publication in 1768 of Worlidge's Antique Gems.

On completing his apprenticeship Grimaldi started life as a miniature-painter, working only in water-colours up to 1785, when he made some essays in enamel painting. From 1777 to 1783 he was in Paris.

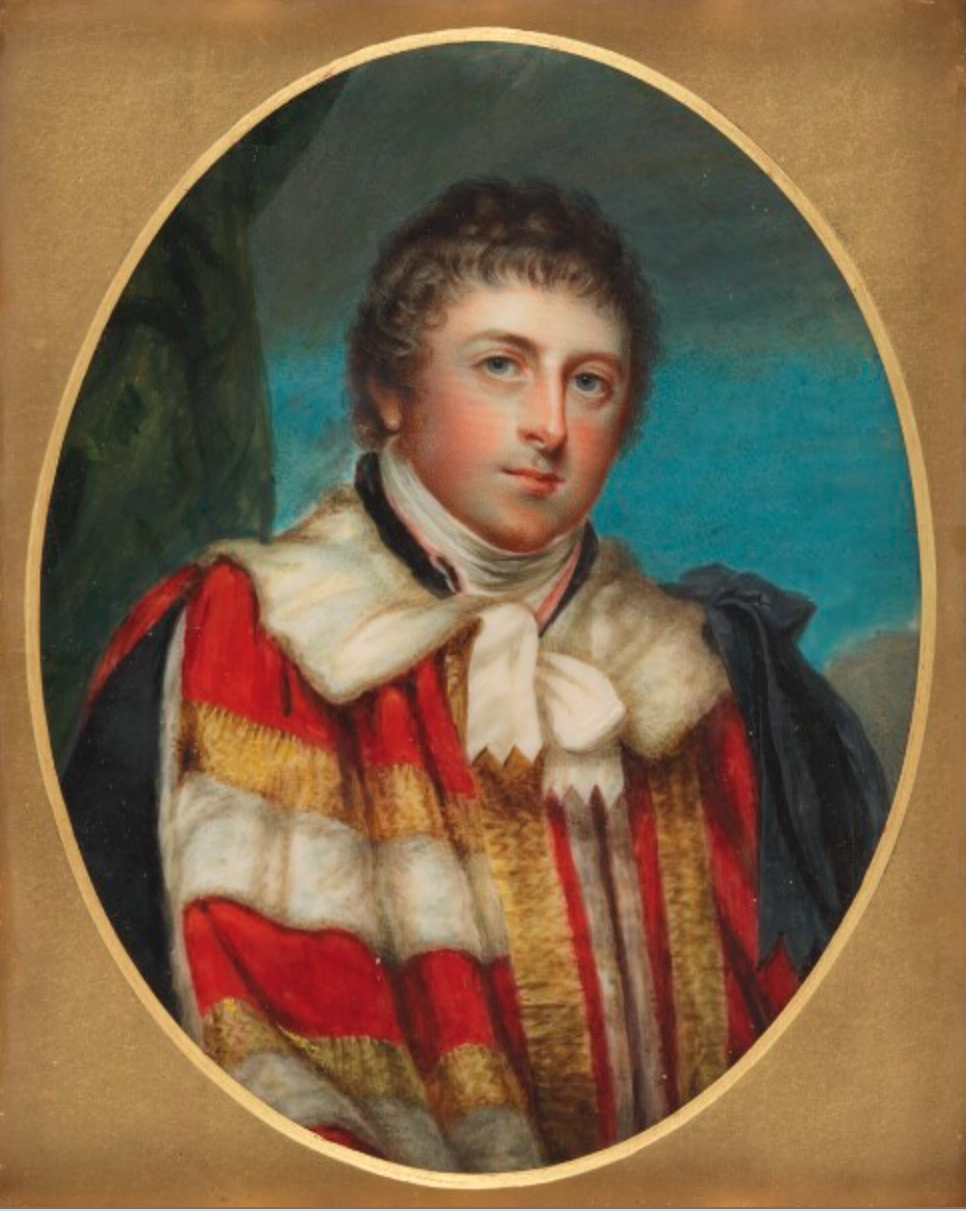
Watercolour miniature of Francis Russell, 5th Duke of Bedford by Grimaldi, after John Hoppner.

He attracted the notice of Sir Joshua Reynolds, many of whose works, notably his Master Bunbury, Grimaldi copied in miniature; Reynolds recommended him to many persons of distinction, including the Prince of Wales and Prince Frederick, Duke of York and Albany. For the former he painted a miniature of Maria Fitzherbert, and for the latter a miniature of the duke, which was presented to the duchess Princess Frederica Charlotte of Prussia on their marriage. In 1790 he was appointed enamel painter to the Duke of York, in 1791 to the Duchess of York, and in 1804 to the Prince of Wales.

Grimaldi was a frequent exhibitor at the Royal Academy from 1786 to 1824. He practised in the country as well as in London, but in 1825 settled at 16 Upper Ebury Street, Chelsea, where he died 27 May 1830, and was buried in Bunhill Fields cemetery. In 1873 the Rev. A. B. Grimaldi published A Catalogue, Chronological and Descriptive, of the Paintings, Drawings, and Engravings by and after William Grimaldi, R.A., Paris, Enamel-Painter Extraordinary to George IV.

== Family ==
He married, 13 November 1783, Frances, daughter of Louis Barker of Rochester, by whom he was father of Stacey Grimaldi. William and Stacey were pioneers of the interactive book, with William designing a "lift-the-flap" book in the 1820s.

== Notes ==
Attribution

This article incorporates text from a publication now in the public domain: "Grimaldi, William". Dictionary of National Biography. London: Smith, Elder & Co. 1885–1900.
