= Gil Blas (play) =

Play by Edward Moore

- Original language: English
- Written by: Edward Moore
- Genre: Comedy

Premiere
- Date: 2 February 1751
- Place: Theatre Royal, Drury Lane, London

Gil Blas is a 1751 comedy play by the British writer Edward Moore. It is based on the novel Gil Blas by French writer Alain-René Lesage.

The original Drury Lane cast included David Garrick as Gil Blas, Henry Woodward as Don Lewis, John Palmer as Don Felix, John Sowdon as Don Gabriel, Richard Yates as Melchior, Hannah Pritchard as Aurora, Frances Cross as Beatrice and Ann Pitt as Bernarda.

== Bibliography ==
- Baines, Paul & Ferarro, Julian & Rogers, Pat. The Wiley-Blackwell Encyclopedia of Eighteenth-Century Writers and Writing, 1660-1789. Wiley-Blackwell, 2011.
- Watson, George. The New Cambridge Bibliography of English Literature: Volume 2, 1660-1800. Cambridge University Press, 1971.
