= Stacey Grimaldi =

English lawyer and antiquary

Stacey Grimaldi (18 October 1790 – 28 March 1863), was an English lawyer and antiquary.

== Life ==
Stacey Grimaldi was descended from the house of Grimaldi: he was the great-grandson of Alexander Grimaldi of Genoa, who quit that city after its bombardment by Louis XIV in 1684, and whose father of the same name had been doge of Genoa in 1671. He was born in the parish of St. James, Westminster, on 18 October 1790, and was the second son of William Grimaldi, miniature-painter, of Albemarle Street, London, by his wife Frances, daughter of Louis Barker of Rochester. Upon the death of his elder brother in 1835 the title of Marquis Grimaldi of Genoa and the claims on the family possessions in Genoa and Monaco became vested in him.

For upwards of forty years he practised as a solicitor in Copthall Court in the city of London. He was eminent as a 'record lawyer,' and was engaged in several important record trials and peerage cases. In 1824 he was elected a fellow of the Society of Antiquaries. In 1834 he was appointed to deliver lectures on the public records at the Law Institution, and in 1853 an auditor of the Incorporated Law Society. He was a frequent contributor to the Gentleman's Magazine from 1813 to 1861. He resided for many years at Maze Hill, Greenwich; latterly at Herndon House, Eastry, Kent, where he died on 28 March 1863. In 1825 he married Mary Ann, daughter of Thomas George Knapp of Haberdashers' Hall and Norwood, Surrey. By her he left six sons and three daughters.

== Works ==
- The Toilet; a book for Young Ladies, consisting of a series of double plates, illustrated with appropriate poetry, London,1821, 1822: 3rd edit., 1823.
- A Suit of Armour for Youth, London, 1823 (2nd ed, 1824), 12mo; a series of engravings of body-armour, copied from real examples and designs illustrating historical anecdotes.
- A Synopsis of the History of England, from the Conquest to the Present Time, London, 1825, 12mo; 2nd edit., revised and enlarged by his son, the Rev. Alexander Beaufort Grimaldi, M.A., of Caius College, Cambridge, London, 1871, 8vo.
- Origines Genealogicæ; or, the Sources whence English Genealogies may be traced, from the Conquest to the Present Time, accompanied by Specimens of Antient Records, Rolls, and Manuscripts, with proofs of their Genealogical Utility. Published expressly for the assistance of Claimants to Hereditary Titles, Honours, or Estates, London, 1828, 4to.
- The Genealogy of the Family of Grimaldi of Genoa and of England, shewing their relationship to the Grimaldis, Princes of Monaco, London, 1834. A copy, with manuscript additions by the author, in the British Museum has the note: 'The principality of Monaco is now [1834] claimed from the reigning Prince of Monaco by the Marquess Luigi Grimaldi della Pietra, on the ground that it is a male fief, and ought not to have descended to heirs female; and this pedigree has been compiled to show at Genoa and Turin that the Grimaldis of England are the oldest branch, and have prior claims.'
- Lectures on the Sources from which Pedigrees may be traced, [London, 1835], 8vo.
- Miscellaneous Writings, prose and poetry, from printed and manuscript sources, 1874–1881, 4 pts., edited by Alexander Beaufort Grimaldi. The longest treatise in this multifarious collection, of which only one hundred copies were printed for private circulation, is entitled 'Nomenclatura, or a Discourse upon Names. Containing Remarks on some in the Hebrew, Grecian, Roman, and British tongues; together with a Dictionary comprising more than 3,000 Names, with their derivation and meaning.'
