= The Devil to Pay (opera) =

1731 ballad opera

- Original language: English
- Written by: Charles Coffey; John Mottley
- Based on: The Devil of a Wife by Thomas Jevon
- Genre: Comedy

Premiere
- Date: 6 August 1731
- Place: Theatre Royal, Drury Lane

The Devil to Pay is a 1731 ballad opera by the Irish writer Charles Coffey and British writer John Mottley. Also known by the longer title The Devil to Pay: Or, The Wives Metamorphos'd, it was part of a group of ballad operas produced in the wake of the success of John Gay's The Beggar's Opera. The work is adapted from Thomas Jevon's 1686 play The Devil of a Wife.

The original Drury Lane cast included Theophilus Cibber as Gaffer Dunfork, John Harper as Hobson, Richard Charke as Ananias, James Oates as Doctor, Edward Berry as Butler, Thomas Wright as Footman, Theodosia Mills as Lady Loverule and Kitty Clive as Nell. The published version in 1732 was dedicated to the Duke of Dorset, the Lord Lieutenant of Ireland.

== Bibliography ==
- Burling, William J. A Checklist of New Plays and Entertainments on the London Stage, 1700-1737. Fairleigh Dickinson Univ Press, 1992.
- Nicoll, Allardyce. A History of Early Eighteenth Century Drama: 1700-1750. CUP Archive, 1927.
