= Thomas Worlidge =

English painter

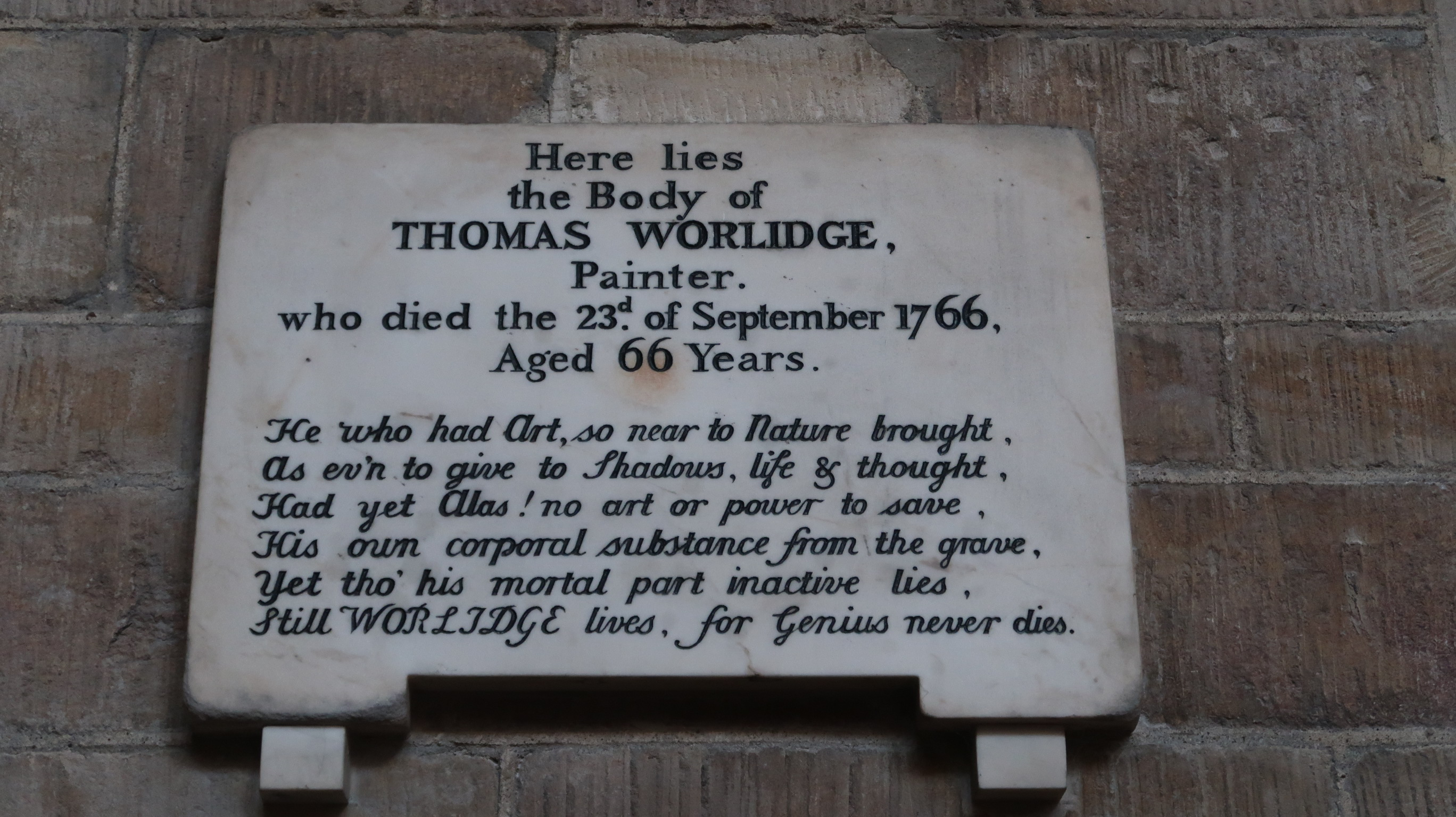
Wall monument to Thomas Worlidge in St Paul's Church, Hammersmith, London UK

Thomas Worlidge (1700−1766) was an English painter and etcher.

== Life ==
He was born in Peterborough of Roman Catholic parents, and studied art in London as a pupil of the Genoese refugee Alessandro Maria Grimaldi (1659−1732). He painted portraits of his master Grimaldi and his master's wife about 1720. He married Grimaldi's daughter, and remained on close terms with Alexander Grimaldi, his master's son. Subsequently, he received instruction from Louis Peter Boitard. About 1736 Worlidge and the younger Grimaldi are said to have visited Birmingham, where Worlidge reintroduced the art of painting on glass. For a time, too, he seems to have practised portrait painting at Bath, Somerset.

About 1740 Worlidge settled in London in the neighbourhood of Covent Garden, where he remained for the rest of his life. At one time Worlidge's address was ‘at the Piazza, Covent Garden.’ He afterwards resided in Bedford Street and King Street in the same neighbourhood.

In 1763 he settled in Great Queen Street in a large house built by Inigo Jones, adjoining the later site of the Freemasons' Tavern. Worlidge became obese and a drinker in later life, and suffered from gout. In his last years he spent much of his leisure in a country house situated in Messrs. Kennedy & Leigh's nursery-ground at Hammersmith. There he died on 23 September 1766, and was buried in St Paul's Church in Hammersmith. A plain marble slab, inscribed with verses by William Kenrick, was placed on the wall of the church; it is now at the east end of the south aisle.

== Works ==
His portraits in oil and pastel enjoyed some vogue, his first reputation was made by his miniature portraits. In middle life his most popular work consisted of heads in blacklead pencil, for which he charged two guineas; leaders of fashionable society employed him to make these drawing. Later he concentrated his energies on etching in the style of Rembrandt, using a dry-needle with triangular point. He copied some of Rembrandt's prints, among them the artist's portrait of himself and the hundred-guelder plate. An etching after Rembrandt's portrait of Sir John Astley was described by Horace Walpole as Worlidge's ‘best piece.’ Worlidge drew a pencil portrait of himself, which is reproduced in Walpole's Anecdotes (edition by Ralph Nicholson Wornum). Examples of Worlidge's drawings and etchings are in the British Museum print-room. There is also there a priced catalogue of a selection of his etchings.

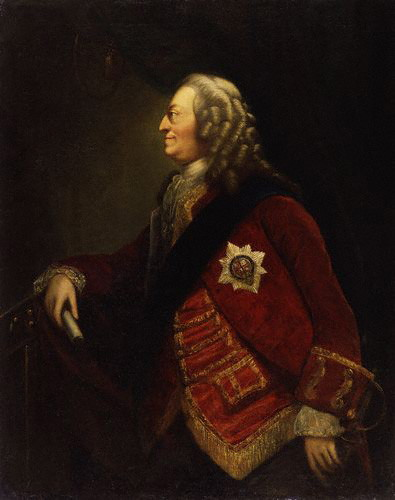
Portrait of King George II, c.1753, by or after Worlidge.

One of Worlidge's most popular plates depicted the installation of John Fane, 7th Earl of Westmorland as chancellor of the university at the Sheldonian Theatre at Oxford in 1761. Worlidge represents himself in the gallery on the right in the act of drawing the scene with his second wife beside him. In the corresponding place on the left-hand side of the plate is a portrait of his brother-in-law, Alexander Grimaldi. Most of the numerous heads and figures are portraits. A plate of the bust of Cicero at Oxford (known as the Pomfret bust) also enjoyed a wide vogue.

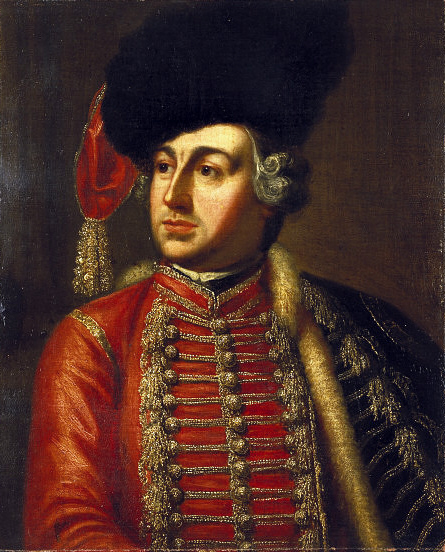
David Garrick in character as Tancred from James Thomson's Tancred and Sigismunda, 1752.

In April 1754 Worlidge had a large collection of his works to be sold by public auction. The printed catalogue bore the title, ‘A Collection of Pictures painted by Mr. Worlidge of Covent Garden, consisting’ ‘of Histories, Heads, Landscapes, and Dead Game, and also some Drawings.’ The highest price fetched was £51 15s. 6d., which was given for a ‘fine head’ after Rembrandt. More than sixteen hundred prints and more than thirteen hundred drawings by Worlidge were sold by Abraham Langford in March 1767 by order of his widow.

Worlidge's last work was his Antique Gems, a series of 182 etchings of gems from the antique (three are in duplicate). The series was published in parts, some of which seem to have been issued as early as 1754; but Worlidge died before the work was completed. It was finished by his pupils William Grimaldi and George Powle, and, printed on satin, was published by his widow in 1768 at the price of eighteen guineas a copy. The frontispiece, dated 1754, shows Worlidge drawing the Pomfret bust of Cicero; behind on an easel is a portrait of his second wife, Mary. No letterpress was included originally in the volume, but between 1768 and 1780 a few copies were issued with letterpress. After 1780 a new edition, but bearing the original date of 1768, appeared with letterpress in two volumes at five guineas each. The title-page omits mention of ‘M. Wicksteed's’ name, but is otherwise a replica of the first. Some of the old copper plates (108 in all) were reproduced in ‘Antique Gems, etched by T. Worlidge on Copper Plates, in the Possession of Sheffield Grace, Esq.,’ London, 1823, (privately printed). Charles William King in his Antique Gems (1872, i. 469) thought Worlidge's plates often inferior to those of Jonathan Spilsbury, and that the descriptions placed below contained some blunders.

== Family ==
Worlidge was three times married: first, to Arabella (b. 1709), daughter of Alessandro Grimaldi (d. 1732); she died before 1749. The name of his second wife was Mary.

He married in 1763 his third wife, Elizabeth Wicksteed, daughter of a toyman of Bath, and apparently sister of the well-known seal engraver there. She assisted Worlidge in his artistic work, and gained a reputation for herself by her skill in copying paintings in needlework. After Worlidge's death she carried on the sale of his etchings at his house in Great Queen Street; but she let the mansion to Hester Darby and her daughter, Mary Robinson ('Perdita'), on her marriage to a wine and spirit merchant named Ashley, who had been one of Worlidge's friends.

Worlidge is said to have had thirty-two children by his three marriages, but only Thomas, a son by his third wife, survived him. This son married, in 1787, Phoebe, daughter of Alexander Grimaldi (1714−1800); she was buried in Bunhill Fields on 14 January 1829. Her husband migrated to the West Indies in 1792. In March 1826 he was again in London, and while employed as compositor in the office of the Morning Advertiser was sent to prison for an assault. His father drew a portrait of him, which bore the title ‘A Boy's Head.’

== Notes ==
Attribution

This article incorporates text from a publication now in the public domain: "Worlidge, Thomas". Dictionary of National Biography. London: Smith, Elder & Co. 1885–1900.
