= The Astrologer (play) =

Play by James Ralph

- Original language: English
- Written by: James Ralph
- Genre: Comedy

Premiere
- Date: 3 April 1744
- Place: Theatre Royal, Drury Lane

The Astrologer is a 1744 comedy play by James Ralph.

The original Drury Lane cast included William Mills as Stargaze, Richard Yates as Motley, William Havard as Young Whimsey, William Giffard as Young Detrell, Edward Berry as Siftem, Peg Woffington as Laetitia and Anna Marcella Giffard as Clara. The epilogue was written and spoken by David Garrick.

== Bibliography ==
- Genest, John (1832). Some Account of the English Stage from the Restoration in 1660 to 1830. Vol. 3. Bath: H. E. Carrington.
- Nicoll, Allardyce. A History of Early Eighteenth Century Drama: 1700-1750. CUP Archive, 1927.
