= Symphony No. 8 (Haydn) =

Symphony by Joseph Haydn

- Le soir
- by Joseph Haydn
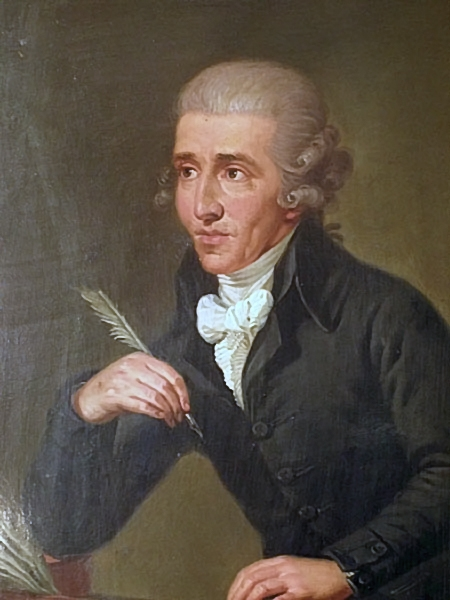
- Portrait of Joseph Haydn, ca. 1770
- Key: G major
- Catalogue: Hob. I:8
- Composed: 1761
- Dedication: Paul II Anton Esterházy
- Duration: c. 20 minutes
- Movements: 4
- Scoring: Orchestra

Premiere
- Date: 1761
- Location: Vienna
- Conductor: Joseph Haydn
- Performers: Prince Esterházy’s court orchestra

Joseph Haydn wrote his Symphony No. 8 in G major under the employ of Prince Paul II Anton Esterházy in Spring 1761, in the transition between the Baroque and Classical periods. It is the third part of a set of three symphonies that Prince Anton had commissioned him to write, given the inspiration as the three times of day. This one is Le soir or "Evening".

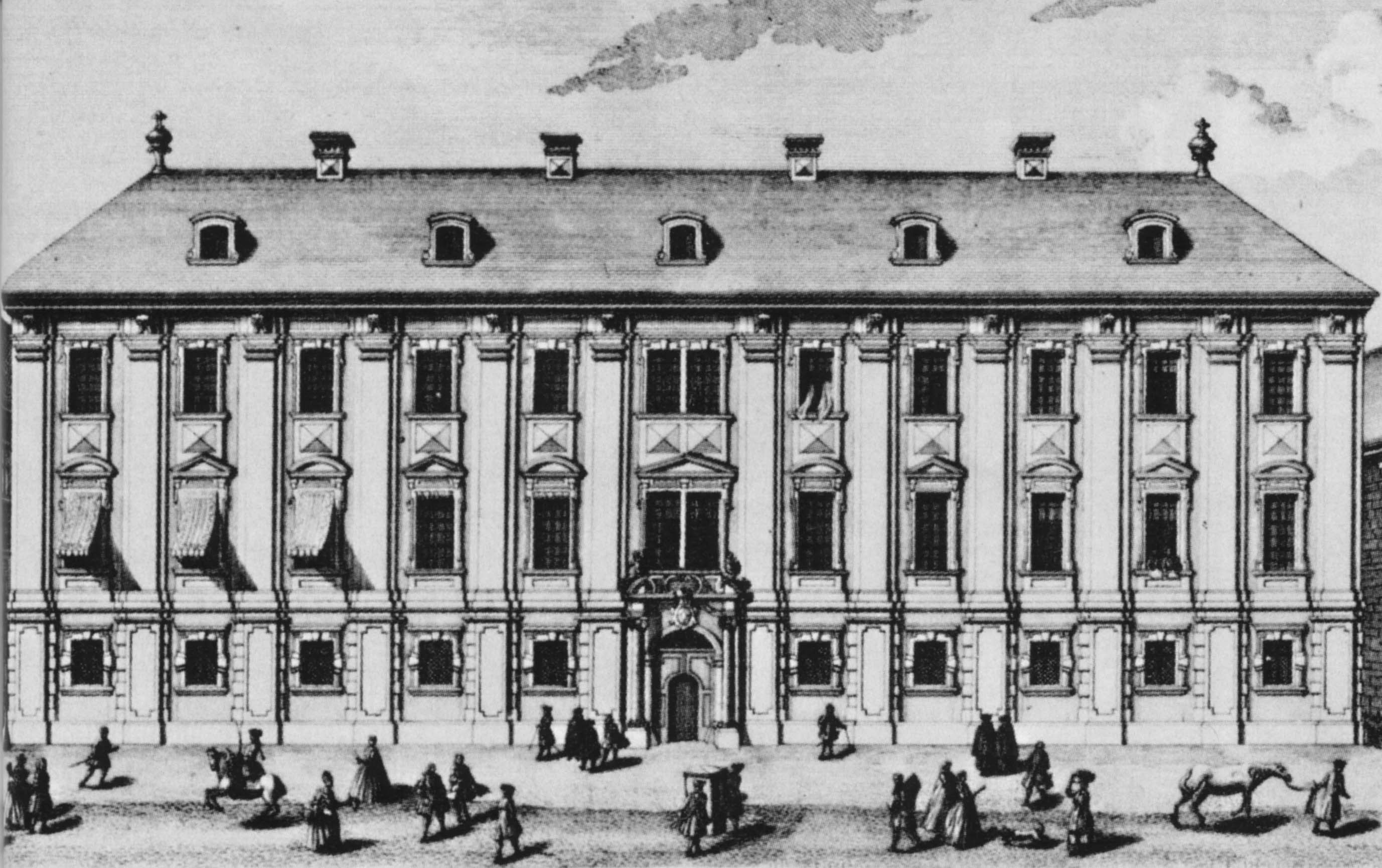
The Esterházy Palace on Vienna's Wallnerstraße, where this symphony premiered.

== Orchestration ==
The orchestration used in Symphony No. 8 is very similar to the concerto grosso style of the Baroque period, where a small group of solo instruments was set against a larger ensemble. In Symphony No. 8, the small group consists of two solo violins, solo violoncello and a solo violone and the large ensemble contains one flute, two oboes, bassoon, two horns, strings, and harpsichord. Haydn's use of the bassoon and harpsichord is reminiscent of the basso continuo used extensively throughout the Baroque period; however it is not as constantly driving.

== Movements ==
This symphony has the usual number of four movements for a classical symphony (in the tonic G major unless otherwise specified):

1. Allegro molto, 3/8
2. Andante in C major, 2/4
3. Menuetto & Trio (Trio in C major), 3/4
4. La tempesta: Presto, 6/8

The first movement is a gigue in sonata form and quotes a melody from a song in Christoph Willibald Gluck's opera Le diable à quatre called "Je n'aimais pas le tabac beaucoup" ("I didn't like tobacco much"). The final movement, also in sonata form, subtitled La tempesta, was intended to evoke the sensation of a thunderstorm.

In the first movement, the strings start with the main eight-bar melody, a theme which carries throughout the entire movement. Haydn makes use of the concerto grosso format in the second movement, with the melody in the concertino – two solo violins and solo violoncello. The melody of the menuet is fairly conventional, with the bassoon, violone, and strings taking up the theme in the trio. In the final movement, La tempesta (the storm), the strings have a series of descending figures which suggest falling rain, and octave leaps in the solo violin are used to build tension. An interesting anecdote about the theme of the flute in this movement: When Haydn describes a storm in his last oratorio, The Seasons, he uses the same theme as in this movement, with the same orchestration – passage in the flute of descending broken chord.

== See also ==
- List of symphonies by name
