= Regulus (1744 play) =

1744 play

- Written by: William Havard
- Original language: English
- Genre: Tragedy

Premiere
- Date premiered: 21 February 1744
- Place premiered: Theatre Royal, Drury Lane

Regulus is a 1744 tragedy by the British writer William Havard. It portrays the career of Marcus Atilius Regulus, a Roman Consul at the time of the First Punic War. It ran for seven performances during the season.

The original Drury Lane cast included David Garrick as Regulus, Havard himself as Decius, Dennis Delane as Corvus, William Mills as Metullus, Edward Berry as Manlius, James Taswell as Attilus Regulus, Edward Woodburn as Emelius, Howard Usher as Second Ambassador, Anne Budgell as Clelia and Anna Marcella Giffard as Martia.

== Bibliography ==
- Baines, Paul & Ferarro, Julian & Rogers, Pat. The Wiley-Blackwell Encyclopedia of Eighteenth-Century Writers and Writing, 1660-1789. Wiley-Blackwell, 2011.
- Highfill, Philip H, Burnim, Kalman A. & Langhans, Edward A. A Biographical Dictionary of Actors, Actresses, Musicians, Dancers, Managers, and Other Stage Personnel in London, 1660-1800: Garrick to Gyngell. SIU Press, 1978.
