= The Foundling (play) =

1748 play

- Original language: English
- Written by: Edward Moore
- Genre: Comedy

Premiere
- Date: 13 February 1748
- Place: Theatre Royal, Drury Lane, London

The Foundling is a 1748 comedy by the British writer Edward Moore.

The original Drury Lane cast included David Garrick as Young Belmont, Spranger Barry as Sir Charles Raymond, Charles Macklin as Faddle, William Havard as Colonel Raymond, Richard Yates as Sir Roger Belmont, Peg Woffington as Rosetta and Susannah Cibber as Fidelia.

== Bibliography ==
- Baines, Paul & Ferarro, Julian & Rogers, Pat. The Wiley-Blackwell Encyclopedia of Eighteenth-Century Writers and Writing, 1660-1789. Wiley-Blackwell, 2011.
- Nicoll, Allardyce. History of English Drama, 1660-1900, Volume 2. Cambridge University Press, 2009.
