= Tancred and Sigismunda =

1745 play

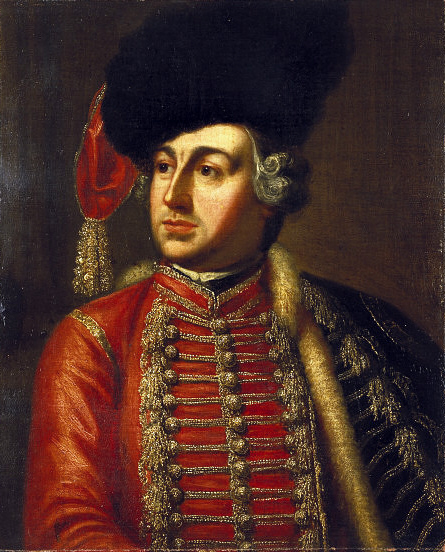
- David Garrick playing Tancred in 1752, by Thomas Worlidge
- Original language: English
- Written by: James Thomson
- Genre: Tragedy
- Setting: Palermo, Italy

Premiere
- Date: 18 March 1745
- Place: Theatre Royal, Drury Lane, London

Tancred and Sigismunda is a 1745 tragedy by the British writer James Thomson. It is inspired by one of the story's from Giovanni Boccaccio's The Decameron.

The original cast included David Garrick as Tancred, Thomas Sheridan as Siffredi, Dennis Delane as Osmond, William Havard as Rodolpho and Susannah Arne as Sigismunda.

== Bibliography ==
- Baines, Paul & Ferarro, Julian & Rogers, Pat. The Wiley-Blackwell Encyclopedia of Eighteenth-Century Writers and Writing, 1660-1789. Wiley-Blackwell, 2011.
- Nicoll, Allardyce. A History of Early Eighteenth Century Drama: 1700-1750. CUP Archive, 1927.
- Wilson, Brett D. A Race of Female Patriots: Women and Public Spirit on the British Stage, 1688-1745. Lexington Books, 2012.
