= Agis (play) =

Blank verse tragedy by John Home

- Original language: English
- Written by: John Home
- Genre: Tragedy

Premiere
- Date: 21 February 1758
- Place: Theatre Royal, Drury Lane

Agis, A Tragedy is a blank verse tragedy by the Scottish dramatist John Home. It was his first play, but has been greatly overshadowed, by his second (and once famous) play Douglas.

It is a classical drama, based on the life of Agis, king of Sparta and is founded on Plutarch's narrative.

After writing the play in Scotland in 1747, Home took it to London, and submitted it to David Garrick for representation at Drury Lane, but it was rejected as unsuitable for the stage. The play was produced later at Drury Lane on 21 February 1758 by Garrick. It was interpreted by actors, the play was performed for eleven days but considered inferior to Douglas, another Home's play. The Drury Lane cast featured Garrick as Lysander, Henry Mossop as Agis, William Havard as Amphares, Thomas Davies as Euxus, Charles Holland as Reusus, Hannah Pritchard as Ageistrata, Mary Ann Yates as Sandane and Susannah Cibber as Euathane.

== Bibliography ==
- Nicoll, Allardyce. A History of English Drama 1660–1900: Volume III. Cambridge University Press, 2009.
- Hogan, C.B (ed.) The London Stage, 1660–1800: Volume IV. Southern Illinois University Press, 1968.
