= The Fatal Retirement =

Play by Anthony Brown

- Original language: English
- Written by: Anthony Brown
- Genre: Tragedy

Premiere
- Date: 12 November 1739
- Place: Theatre Royal, Drury Lane

The Fatal Retirement is a 1739 tragedy by the writer Anthony Brown. In his published version of the work, Brown complained about the last minute withdrawal of star actor James Quin from the play and the generally poor performance of the rest of the cast which he blamed for its public failure.

The original Drury Lane cast included William Mills as Artamon, William Milward as Lanertes, Edward Berry as Ceron, Anna Marcella Giffard as Semandra, Elizabeth Butler as Sabia and Elizabeth Mills as Leonora.

== Bibliography ==
- Avery, Emmett Langdon . The London Stage, Volume III: A Calendar Of Plays, Entertainments And Afterpieces, Together With Casts, Box Receipts And Contemporary Comment. Southern Illinois University Press, 1961.
- Swindells, Julia & Taylor, David Francis. The Oxford Handbook of the Georgian Theatre 1737-1832. OUP, 2014.
