= Richard Winstone =

British stage actor

Richard Winstone (1699–1787) was a British stage actor of the eighteenth century.

In 1732 Winstone joined Henry Giffard's Goodman's Fields Theatre. After this he worked at several London theatres including Lincoln's Inn Fields, Her Majesty's Theatre and Bartholomew Fair. From 1734 to 1753 he was an established part of the Drury Lane company working with David Garrick among others, making occasional appearances at other theatres.

From 1743 he spent his summers working at the Jacobs Well Theatre in Bristol. After making his final London appearance in May 1753 he settled in Bristol and took an active role in the company there, which eventually gained a new home at the Theatre Royal, Bristol and also performed in Bath. He retired in 1784 and died in the city three years later.

== Selected roles ==
- Selim in Scanderbeg (1733)
- Silvus in Junius Brutus (1734)
- Paulinus in The Christian Hero (1735)
- Touchwood in The Double Dealer (1735)
- Gremio in The Universal Passion by James Miller (1737)
- Constable in Art and Nature by James Miller (1738)
- Gaylove in The Coffee House by James Miller (1738)
- Mufti in Mustapha by David Mallet (1739)
- Belus in Elmerick (1740)
- Judge in Love the Cause and Cure of Grief (1743)
- Pharon in Mahomet the Imposter (1744)
- Charney in Edward the Black Prince by William Shirley (1750)
- Posthumius in The Brothers (1753)

== Bibliography ==
- Highfill, Philip H, Burnim, Kalman A. & Langhans, Edward A. A Biographical Dictionary of Actors, Actresses, Musicians, Dancers, Managers, and Other Stage Personnel in London, 1660–1800: Garrick to Gyngell. SIU Press, 1978.
