= Benjamin Victor (theatre manager) =

English theatrical manager and writer

Benjamin Victor (died 1778) was an English theatrical manager and writer.

== Life ==
He began life as a barber near Drury Lane. In 1722 he was at Norwich, perhaps to establish a textile business. Later he dealt in Irish linen, and established a business at a large house on Pall Mall. Between 1734 and 1746 he made visits to Ireland in order to extend his connections; but the business did not prove profitable. In January 1746 he decided to give it up, and on 11 October 1746 he settled with his family in Dublin as treasurer and deputy-manager to Thomas Sheridan at the Smock Alley Theatre.

The theatre for some years was fairly successful; but about 1753 Sheridan was at variance with a portion of the theatre-going public, and for two years Victor and John Sowdon, a principal actor in the company, took over its management. On 15 July 1755 Sheridan returned to Dublin, and Victor resumed his old position. Eventually the theatre was closed on 20 April 1759, and Victor returned to England.

Shortly after his return to England Victor obtained the post of treasurer of Drury Lane Theatre, which he retained until his death. Victor died at his lodgings in Charles Street, Covent Garden, London, on 3 December 1778. He was married before 1738; his first wife died late in 1757, and by 1759 he had married again. Benjamin Victor's second marriage was to Penelope Wolseley, the illegitimate daughter of Sir William Wolseley and the actress, Christiana Horton.

== Works ==
In 1722, after he had been introduced to Richard Steele by Aaron Hill, he wrote ‘An Epistle to Sir Richard Steele’ (two editions, 1722), in which he defended Steele's play The Conscious Lovers against attacks of John Dennis. In 1728 he was introduced to Barton Booth, and his ‘Memoirs of the Life of Barton Booth, published by an intimate acquaintance,’ 1733, is a source for the actor's career.

After the arrival of Frederick Louis, Prince of Wales, in England in December 1728, Victor presented to him, through Lord Malpas, a congratulatory poem, and had hopes of obtaining a place in the prince's household; but was disappointed. Next year he composed a satire called ‘The Levée Haunter,’ which met with the approbation of Sir Robert Walpole.

From 1746 Victor wrote the birthday odes for the court of Dublin, and Lionel Sackville, 1st Duke of Dorset, when resigning the position of lord lieutenant in 1755, obtained permission to put Victor's name, as poet laureate of Ireland, on the viceregal establishment. Several of these odes are in his collections of 1776, and two were printed separately. In 1755 Victor, who seems to have known Sir William Wolseley, 5th Baronet, the fifth baronet, of Staffordshire, published an anonymous narrative entitled ‘The Widow of the Wood;’ it was republished at Glasgow in 1769. It was so offensive to members of the Wolseley family that they are said to have destroyed every copy of the book that they could.

In 1761 he published, in two volumes, a ‘History of the Theatres of London and Dublin from 1730, with an Annual Register of all Plays performed at the Theatres Royal in London from 1712,’ and in 1771 he published a third volume, bringing the narrative down to that date. The second volume contains information on the lives of the chief actors from about 1710 to 1745. Walley Chamberlain Oulton compiled in 1796 a continuation in two volumes, bringing the record down to 1795; and in 1818, in three more volumes, he carried it on to 1817.

Victor published in 1776, with a dedication to David Garrick, three volumes of ‘Original Letters, Dramatic Pieces, and Poems.’ The first volume preserved some anecdotes, especially on Sir Richard Steele, and the second volume contained Victor's plays—‘Altamira,’ a tragedy; ‘Fatal Error,’ a tragedy; ‘The Fortunate Peasant,’ a comedy; and ‘The Sacrifice, or Cupid's Vagaries,’ a masque—all of which were unacted. Victor also produced an adaptation of The Two Gentlemen of Verona, which was given five times at Drury Lane in 1763.
