= Thomas Leland =

Irish Anglican priest and historian (1722–1785)

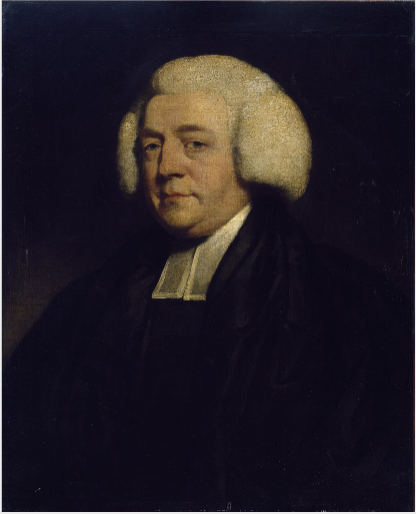
- Thomas Hickey, Portrait de Thomas Leland, Dublin, Galerie nationale d'Irlande.
- Born: 1722
- Died: 1785 (aged 62–63)

Thomas Leland (1722–1785) was an Irish Anglican priest, a historian, translator and academic and the author of the early Gothic novel Longsword, Earl of Salisbury: An Historical Romance, published in 1762. Longsword is set in Gascony and in England, during the reign of Henry III of England.

== Life ==
He was born in Dublin and educated at Thomas Sheridan's school and in 1737 went to Trinity College, where he graduated with a BA in 1742. Leland was made a fellow of Trinity College Dublin in 1746. He was ordained a Church of Ireland priest in 1748, and received his Doctor of Divinity in 1757.

Leland translated the Orations of Demosthenes in three volumes (1756) and wrote a life of Philip of Macedon (1758). In 1761 he became professor of History and of Oratory, concentrating on Oratory as of 1762. In 1768 he became chaplain to Lord Lieutenant Viscount Townsend.

He wrote an influential History of Ireland from the Invasion of Henry II in 1773. His portrait, by John Dean, is held by the National Portrait Gallery.

He served as vicar in Bray, County Wicklow, in 1773 he was appointed Vicar of St. Ann's Church, Dawson Street, in Dublin. His son John was a barrister in Dublin.
