= Creusa, Queen of Athens =

Play by William Whitehead

- Original language: English
- Written by: William Whitehead
- Genre: Tragedy

Premiere
- Date: 20 April 1754
- Place: Theatre Royal, Drury Lane, London

Creusa, Queen of Athens is a 1754 tragedy by the British writer William Whitehead. It is based on the story of Creusa of Athens.

The original Drury Lane cast included David Garrick as Aletes, Maria Macklin as Ilyssus, Hannah Pritchard as Creusa, Henry Mossop as Phorbas and Edward Berry as Xuthus.

== Bibliography ==
- Baines, Paul & Ferarro, Julian & Rogers, Pat. The Wiley-Blackwell Encyclopedia of Eighteenth-Century Writers and Writing, 1660-1789. Wiley-Blackwell, 2011.
- Watson, George. The New Cambridge Bibliography of English Literature: Volume 2, 1660-1800. Cambridge University Press, 1971.
