= The School for Lovers (play) =

1762 play

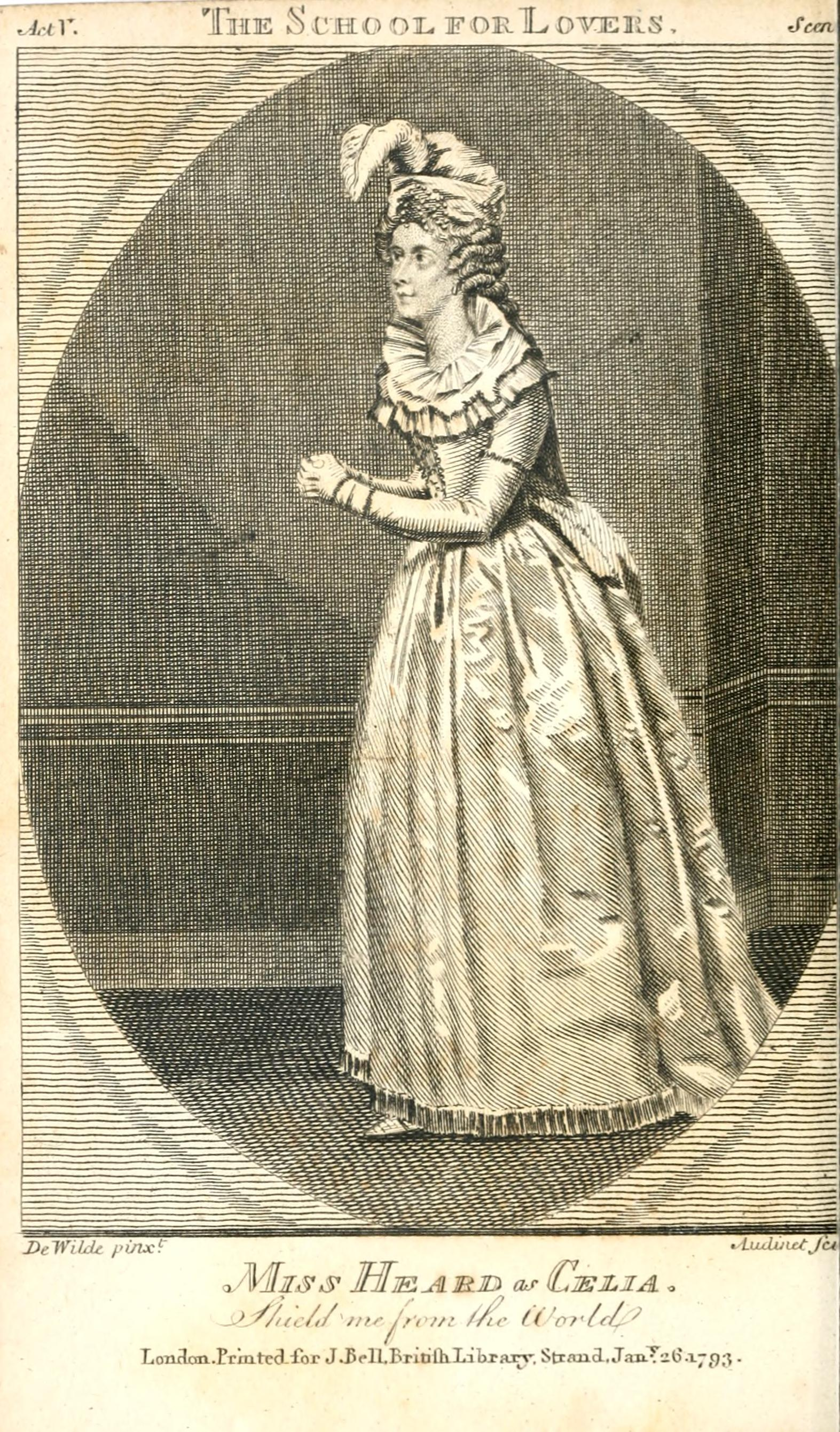
- Original language: English
- Written by: William Whitehead
- Genre: Comedy

Premiere
- Date: 10 February 1762
- Place: Theatre Royal, Drury Lane, London

The School for Lovers is a 1762 comedy play by the British writer William Whitehead.

The original Drury Lane cast included David Garrick as Sir John Dorilant, John Palmer as Modely, William O'Brien as Belmour, Mary Ann Yates as Araminta, Kitty Clive as Lady Beverly and Susannah Maria Cibber as Celia.

== Bibliography ==
- Baines, Paul & Ferarro, Julian & Rogers, Pat. The Wiley-Blackwell Encyclopedia of Eighteenth-Century Writers and Writing, 1660-1789. Wiley-Blackwell, 2011.
- Watson, George. The New Cambridge Bibliography of English Literature: Volume 2, 1660-1800. Cambridge University Press, 1971.
