= Charles Coffey =

Irish playwright, opera librettist, and music arranger

Charles Coffey (late 17th century – 13 May 1745) was an Irish playwright, opera librettist and arranger of music from County Westmeath.

Following the initial failure of his ballad opera The Beggar’s Wedding (Dublin, Smock Alley Theatre, 24 March 1729) - a work capitalising on the success of John Gay's The Beggar's Opera (1728) - he moved to London, where the work opened at the Haymarket on 29 May 1729. In an abbreviated form as Phebe, or The Beggar's Wedding it became highly successful, although it was not to be heard in Dublin before 1754. His fifth ballad opera, The Devil to Pay, or The Wives Metamorphos'd (1731) became the most successful ballad opera of the 18th century after The Beggar's Opera. A German translation as Der Teufel ist los, oder Die verwandelten Weiber (Berlin, 24 January 1743) strongly influenced the development of the German Singspiel.

Coffey died in London and was buried in the St Clement Danes.

== Works ==
- A Wife and No Wife (play) (Dublin, 1724)
- The Beggar’s Wedding (ballad opera) (1729)
- Southwark Fair, or The Sheep-Shearing (ballad opera) (1729)
- Female Parson, or The Beau in the Suds (balled opera) (1730)
- The Devil to Pay, or The Wives Metamorphos'd, a ballad opera written with John Mottley, based on Thomas Jevon's The Devil of a Wife (1731)
- The Boarding-School, or The Sham Captain (ballad opera based on Thomas d'Urfey's Love for Money, or, The Boarding-School) (1733)
- The Merry Cobler, or The Second Part of The Devil to Pay (ballad opera) (1735)
- The Devil Upon Two Sticks, or The Country Beau (ballad opera) (1745)

== Bibliography ==
- Joseph Knight: "Charles Coffey", in Dictionary of National Biography vol. 11 (London, 1887)
- W. J. Lawrence: "Early Irish Ballad Opera and Comic Opera", in: The Musical Quarterly 8 (1922), pp. 397–412
- Peter Kavanagh: The Irish Theatre from the Earliest Period up to the Present Day (Tralee, 1946)
- Walter H. Rubsamen: "Mr. Seedo, Ballad Opera and the Singspiel", in: M. Querol (ed.): Festschrift Higinio Anglès vol. 2 (Barcelona, 1958–61), pp. 775–809.
- Frank Ll. Harrison: "Charles Coffey and Swift's Description of an Irish Feast", in: Swift Studies 1 (1986), pp. 32–8.
- B. H. van Boer: "The Devil to Pay, the Comic War, and the Emergence of the German Singspiel", in: Journal of Musicological Research 8 (1988), pp. 119–39.
- Aloys Fleischmann (ed.): Sources of Irish Traditional Music c.1600-1855 (New York, 1998).
