= Ballad opera =

Opera genre

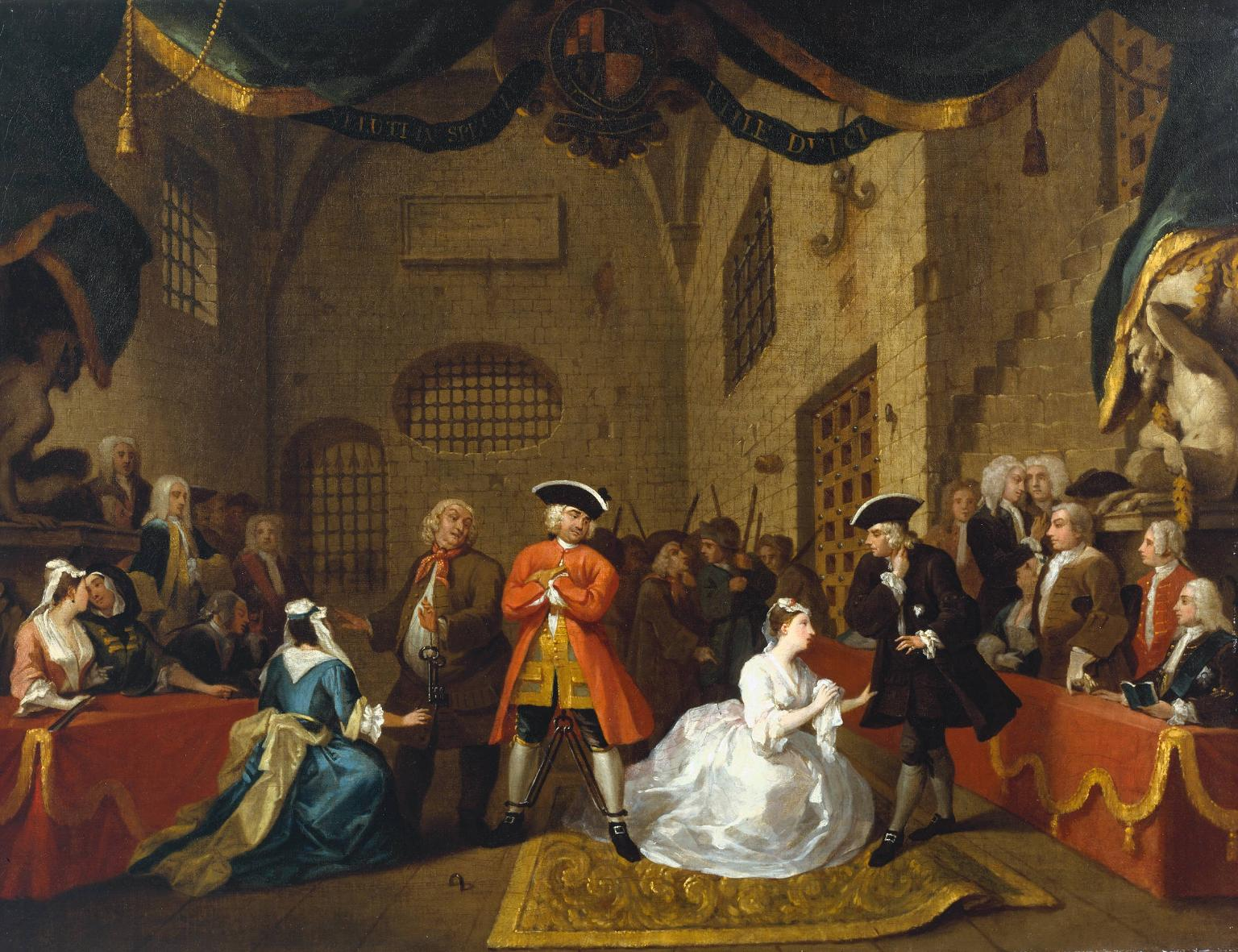
Painting based on The Beggar's Opera, act 3, scene 2, William Hogarth, c. 1728

The ballad opera is a genre of English comic opera stage play that originated in the early 18th century, and continued to develop over the following century and later. Like the earlier comédie en vaudeville and the later Singspiel, its distinguishing characteristic is the use of tunes in a popular style (either pre-existing or newly composed) with spoken dialogue. These English plays were 'operas' mainly insofar as they satirized the conventions of the imported opera seria. Music critic Peter Gammond describes the ballad opera as "an important step in the emancipation of both the musical stage and the popular song."

== Earliest ballad operas ==
Ballad opera has been called an "eighteenth-century protest against the Italian conquest of the London operatic scene." It consists of racy and often satirical spoken (English) dialogue, interspersed with songs that are deliberately kept very short (mostly a single short stanza and refrain) to minimize disruptions to the flow of the story, which involves lower class, often criminal, characters, and typically shows a suspension (or inversion) of the high moral values of the Italian opera of the period.

It is generally accepted that the first ballad opera, and the one that was to prove the most successful, was The Beggar's Opera of 1728. It had a libretto by John Gay and music arranged by Johann Christoph Pepusch, both of whom probably experienced vaudeville theatre in Paris, and may have been motivated to reproduce it in an English form. They were also probably influenced by the burlesques and musical plays of Thomas D'Urfey (1653–1723) who had a reputation for fitting new words to existing songs; a popular anthology of these settings was published in 1700 and frequently re-issued. A number of the tunes from this anthology were recycled in The Beggar's Opera.

After the success of The Beggar's Opera, many similar pieces were staged. The actor Thomas Walker, who played Macheath in the original production, wrote several ballad operas, and Gay produced further works in this style, including a much less successful sequel, Polly. Henry Fielding, Colley Cibber, Charles Coffey, Thomas Arne, Charles Dibdin, Arnold, Shield, Jackson of Exeter, Hook and many others produced ballad operas that enjoyed great popularity. By the middle of the century, however, the genre was already in decline.

Although they featured the lower reaches of society, the audiences for these works were typically the London bourgeois. As a reaction to opera seria (at this time almost invariably sung in Italian), the music, for these audiences, was as satirical in its way as the words of the play. The plays themselves contained references to contemporary politics—in The Beggar's Opera the character Peachum was a lampoon of Sir Robert Walpole. This satirical element meant that many of them risked censorship and banning—as was the case with Gay's successor to The Beggar's Opera, Polly.

The tunes of the original ballad operas were almost all pre-existing (somewhat in the manner of a modern "jukebox musical"): however they were taken from a wide variety of contemporary sources, including folk melodies, popular airs by classical composers (such as Purcell) and even children's nursery rhymes. A significant source from which the music was drawn was the fund of popular airs to which 18th century London broadside ballads are set. It is from this connection that the term "ballad opera" is drawn. This ragbag of familiar music is a good test for distinguishing between the original type of ballad opera and its later forms. Many ballad operas used the same tunes, such as "Lillibullero", and by about 1750 it had become clear that there was a need for new tunes to be written. In 1762, Thomas Arne's Love in a Village presented a new form of ballad opera, with mainly new music and much less reliance on traditional tunes. It was followed in similar style by Charles Dibdin's Lionel and Clarissa in 1768.

The Disappointment (1762) represents an early American attempt at such a ballad opera.

== Singspiel connection ==
In 1736 the Prussian ambassador in England commissioned an arrangement in German of a popular ballad opera, The Devil to Pay, by Charles Coffey. This was successfully performed in Hamburg, Leipzig and elsewhere in Germany in the 1740s. A new version was produced by C. F. Weisse and Johann Adam Hiller in 1766. The success of this version was the first of many by these collaborators, who have been called (according to Grove) "the fathers of the German Singspiel". (The storyline of The Devil to Pay was also adapted for Gluck for his 1759 French opera Le diable à quatre).

== Pastoral ballad opera ==
A later development, also often referred to as ballad opera, was a more "pastoral" form. In subject matter, especially, these "ballad operas" were antithetical to the more satirical variety. In place of the rag-bag of pre-existing music found in (for example) The Beggar's Opera, the scores of these works consisted in the main of original music, although they not infrequently quoted folk melodies, or imitated them. Thomas Arne and Isaac Bickerstaffe's Love in a Village, and William Shield's Rosina (1781) are typical examples. Many of these works were introduced as after-pieces to performances of Italian operas.

Later in the century broader comedies such as Richard Brinsley Sheridan's The Duenna and the innumerable works of Charles Dibdin moved the balance back towards the original style, but there was little remaining of the impetus of the satirical ballad opera.

== 19th century ==
English 19th century opera is very heavily drawn from the "pastoral" form of the ballad opera, and traces even of the satiric kind can be found in the work of "serious" practitioners such as John Barnett. Much of the satiric spirit (albeit in a greatly refined form) of the original ballad opera can be found in Gilbert's contribution to the Savoy operas of Gilbert and Sullivan, and the more pastoral form of ballad opera is satirised in one of Gilbert and Sullivan's early works, The Sorcerer (1877).

== 20th century ==
The Threepenny Opera of Kurt Weill and Bertolt Brecht (1928) is a reworking of The Beggar's Opera, setting a similar story with the same characters, and containing much of the same satirical bite. On the other hand, it uses just one tune from the original—all the other music being specially composed, and thus omits one of the most distinctive features of the original ballad opera.

In a completely different vein, Hugh the Drover, an opera in two acts by Ralph Vaughan Williams first staged in 1924, is also sometimes referred to as a "ballad opera". It is plainly much closer to Shield's Rosina than to The Beggar's Opera.

In the twentieth century folk singers have produced musical plays with folk or folk-like songs called "ballad operas". Alan Lomax, Pete Seeger, Burl Ives, and others recorded The Martins and the Coys in 1944, and Peter Bellamy and others recorded The Transports in 1977. The first of these is in some ways connected to the "pastoral" form of the ballad opera, and the latter to the satiric Beggar's Opera type, but in all they represent yet further reinterpretations of the term.

Ironically, it is in the musicals of Kander and Ebb—especially Chicago and Cabaret—that the kind of satire embodied in The Beggar's Opera and its immediate successors is probably best preserved, although here, as in Weill's version, the music is specially composed, unlike the first ballad operas of the 18th century.

== Bibliography ==
- Edmond M. Gagey: Ballad Opera (New York: Columbia University Press, 1937; re-issued New York & London: Benjamin Blom, 1968).
- John Gay, ed. Hal Gladfelder: The Beggar's Opera and Polly (Oxford University Press, 2013).
- Grove's Dictionary of Music and Musicians, article "Ballad opera"
- Harold Rosenthal and John Warrack: The Concise Oxford Dictionary of Opera (Oxford, 1979), article "Ballad opera".
- Walter H. Rubsamen (ed.): The Ballad Opera. A Collection of 171 Texts of Musical Plays Printed in Photo-Facsimile, 28 volumes (New York, 1974).
