= Longsword (novel) =

1762 novel

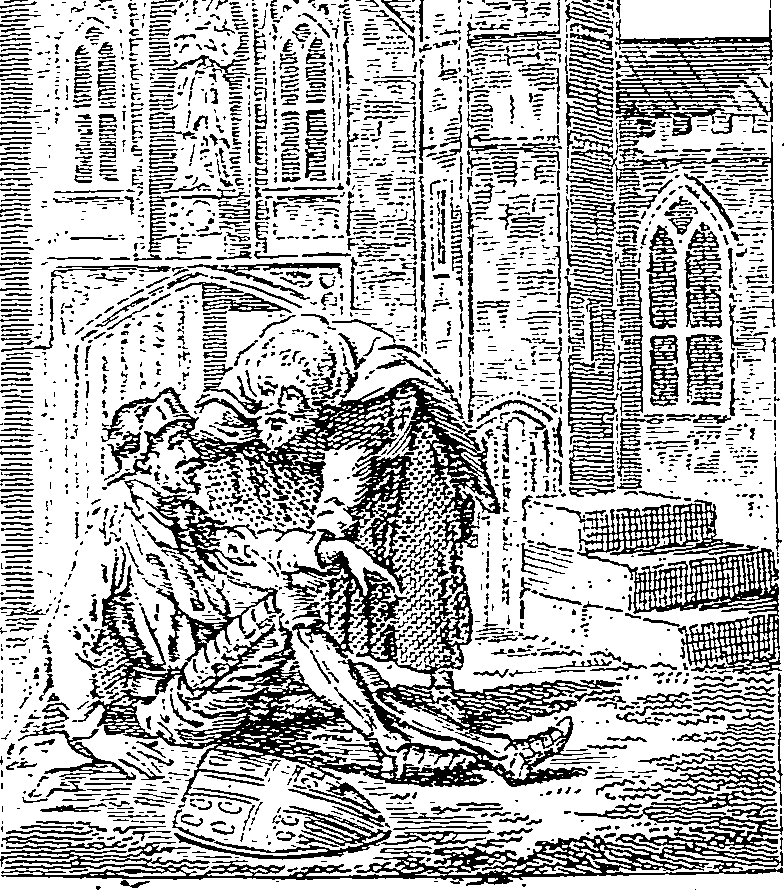
- Illustration from the 1790 edition of the novel.
- Author: Thomas Leland
- Language: English
- Genre: Historical
- Publication date: 1762
- Media type: Print

Longsword by the Irish writer Thomas Leland, is a medieval romance based on the life of William Longespée, 3rd Earl of Salisbury, the son of Henry II. Published in 1762, in 1767 it was adapted into a play The Countess of Salisbury.

Longsword contains "...mystery, dark dungeons, shipwrecks, abducted damsels, evil monks, and heartless villains", Although titled Longsword, Earl of Salisbury: An Historical Romance, Albert Power views it as the "cornerstone" of the Irish Gothic novel as well.

== Bibliography ==
- Donald F. Bond & George, Sherburn. The Literary History of England: Vol 3: The Restoration and Eighteenth Century (1660-1789). Routledge, 2003.
