= Thomas Cooke (author) =

English author and translator

Thomas Cooke (1703 – 29 December 1756), often called "Hesiod" Cooke, was an active English translator and author who ran afoul of Alexander Pope and was mentioned as one of the "dunces" in Pope's Dunciad. His father was an innkeeper. He was educated at Felsted. Cooke arrived in London in 1722 and began working as a writer for the Whig causes. He associated with Thomas Tickell, Ambrose Philips, Leonard Welsted, Richard Steele, and John Dennis. Cooke is the source of one of the primary biographies of John Dennis, which he wrote in Latin.

== Battles with Alexander Pope ==
Cooke did a great deal of first-rate translation from Latin and ancient Greek. His first publication was an elegy on the death of the highly contentious Marlborough in 1722. He followed that with a masque entitled Albion in 1724. His most famous production was The Battle of the Poets in 1725. This was a reworking of the trope of Le Lutrin that had been used by Jonathan Swift in The Battle of the Books. Where Swift had had classical authors and Tory authors sweeping the field of their whig and modern commentators, Cooke had "moderns" and whig authors defeating Alexander Pope and other "tory" authors. That same year, he published an essay in the Daily Journal examining the Thersites section of Pope's Iliad which showed many faults of translation. In 1726, he wrote The Bath, or, The Knights of the Bath. In 1728, Cooke demonstrated his command of Greek with the first translation of Hesiod into English, and he became known as "Hesiod Cooke." The same year, he wrote an opera with John Mottley entitled Penelope.

Pope, therefore, developed a character of Cooke for Dunciad. Cooke heard about this and wrote two letters of apology. He appeared in Dunciad anyway. In response, Cooke reissued The Battle of the Poets and the Daily Journal essay in 1729 in his Tales, Epistles, Odes, Fables, &c. He also wrote several letters for the London Journal in 1729–1730 and issued those as a book dedicated to Horace Walpole (son of the divisive prime minister) in 1731. Pope took another jab at Cooke in his Epistle to Dr. Arbuthnot in 1735 (l. 146).

== Terence and Cicero ==
Apart from his entry into the controversies with Pope, Cooke continued to publish. He produced an edition of Andrew Marvell's poems. In 1731, he published The Triumphs of Love and Honour, with a long essay on the usefulness of the English stage. Later, he wrote a book of Odes, a Life of King Edward III of England in 1734, and essays for the Weekly Oracle on Phalaris. In 1734, he produced a three-volume translation of the plays of Terence, and in 1737 an edition of Cicero's De natura deorum with an extensive critical apparatus. Also in 1737, he produced a play based on Terence called The Eunuch. Two years later, he wrote and published a play called The Mournful Nuptials which was not acted until 1743 (as Love the Cause and Cure of Grief). In 1741, he produced a partial translation of Virgil, with notes.

In 1742, Cooke took part in Colley Cibber's fight over control of the theaters. He wrote The Bays Miscellany, or, Colley Triumphant. He also wrote dialog for the mute plays of John Rich and Cibber's Harlequin. In 1744, he adapted his Le Lutrin piece as The Battle of the Poets as a one-act play to be inserted into Henry Fielding's Tom Thumb. Finally, in 1754, he produced a single volume of a planned series of the works of Plautus. He had gathered up an enormous subscription (713 names) for the publication, and this, in fact, furnished his living expenses.

== Money troubles ==
Cooke was always short of funds and wrote to pay the bills. He was also decidedly political. In 1741 he edited an edition of The Craftsman, Bolingbroke's journal. In 1748, he was brought up on a libel charge for criticism he made of the Pelham administration. The same year, he also wrote a public letter encouraging religious toleration.

He died in poverty on 29 December 1756, leaving a wife named Anne and a daughter named Elizabeth. Elizabeth died two years later, in a workhouse.

== See also ==
- 1725 in literature
