= William Havard (actor) =

British actor

William Havard (1710?–1778), was a British actor and dramatist.

Havard appeared at Goodman's Fields Theatre, 1730–1737, and then at the Drury Lane Theatre until retirement in 1769. He generally played secondary parts; depreciated in Rosciad. He also appeared in his own plays, King Charles I at Lincoln's Inn Fields, 1737; Regulus Drury Lane, 1744; and The Elopement Drury Lane, 1763.

== Selected roles ==
- Montesini in The Parricide (1736)
- Rosebrand in The Independent Patriot (1737)
- Talthybius in Agamemnon (1738)
- Hartly in The Coffee House (1738)
- Achmet in Mustapha (1739)
- Young Freeman in Love the Cause and Cure of Grief (1743)
- Decius in Regulus (1744)
- Young Whimsey in The Astrologer (1744)
- Rodolpho in Tancred and Sigismunda (1745)
- Captain Loveit in Miss in Her Teens (1747)
- Bellamy in The Suspicious Husband (1747)
- Colonel Raymond in The Foundling (1748)
- Abdalla, An Officer in Irene (1749)
- Arnold in Edward the Black Prince (1750)
- Amphares in Agis (1758)
- Timurkan in The Orphan of China (1759)
- Friendly in The Dupe (1763)
- Megistus in Zenobia (1768)
