= William Whitehead (poet) =

English poet and playwright (1715–1785)

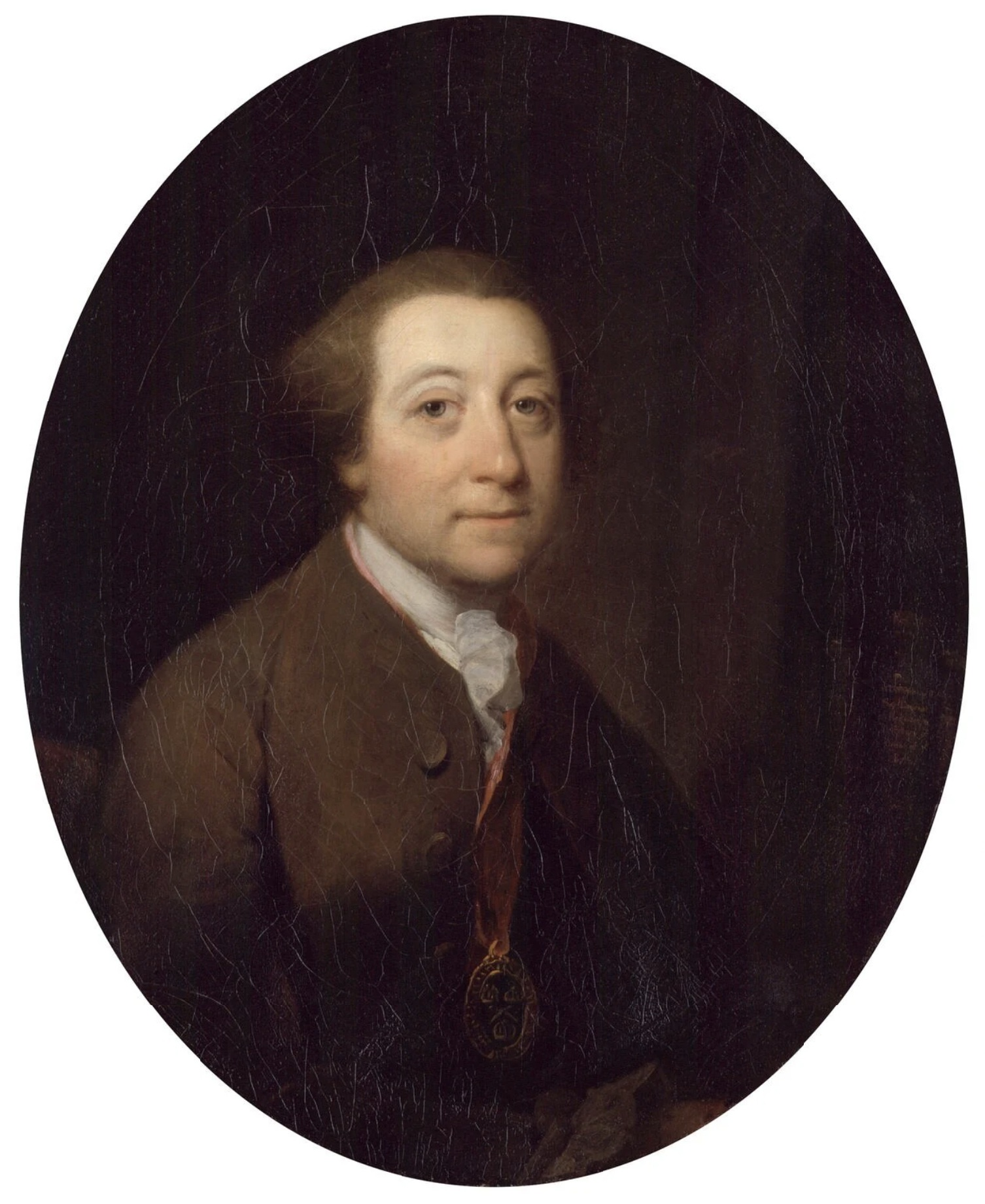
- Portrait by Benjamin Wilson, 1758–1759

Poet Laureate of Great Britain
- In office 19 December 1757 – 14 April 1785
- Monarchs: George II; George III
- Preceded by: Colley Cibber
- Succeeded by: Thomas Warton

Personal details
- Born: 1715 Cambridge, England
- Died: 14 April 1785 (aged 70) Berkeley Square, London
- Resting place: Grosvenor Chapel
- Education: Winchester College (1735); Clare College, Cambridge; BA (1739); MA (1743)
- Occupation: Poet, playwright
- Writing career
- Notable work: Creusa, Queen of Athens (1754); The School for Lovers (1762)

William Whitehead (1715 – 14 April 1785) was an English poet and playwright who served as Poet Laureate of Great Britain from 1757 to 1785.

== Life ==
The son of a baker, Whitehead was born in Cambridge and through the patronage of Henry Bromley, afterwards Baron Montfort, was admitted to Winchester College aged fourteen.

He entered Clare College, Cambridge on a Pyke scholarship in 1735, and became a fellow in 1742 (resigning this in 1746), and admitted Master of Arts in 1743. At Cambridge, Whitehead published an epistle On the Danger of writing Verse and some other poems, notably a heroic epistle, Ann Boleyn to Henry the Eighth (1743), and a didactic Essay on Ridicule, also (1743).

In 1745 Whitehead became the tutor of George Villiers, Viscount Villiers, son of William Villiers, 3rd Earl of Jersey, and took up his residence in London. There he produced two tragedies: The Roman Father and Creusa, Queen of Athens. The plots of these tragedies are based the Horace (1640) of Pierre Corneille, and the Ion (c. 414–412 BC) of Euripides. He accompanied Lord Villiers and George Harcourt, Viscount Nuneham, son of Simon Harcourt, 1st Earl Harcourt on their Grand Tour between 1754 and 1756.

After Thomas Gray refused the Poet Laureateship, it was passed to Whitehead, who was more acceptable at court as he had been the travelling tutor of George Harcourt, Viscount Nuneham, son of Simon Harcourt, 1st Earl Harcourt, who was Governor to the Prince of Wales (later George III).

He was appointed Register and Secretary of the Knights Companions of the Most Honourable Order of the Bath.

He died at home in Charles Street, London on 14 April 1785 and is buried in South Audley Street Chapel.

== Poetry and plays ==
Much of Whitehead's work was well received, for example his tragedy The Roman Father was successfully produced by David Garrick in 1750, Creusa, Queen of Athens (1754) was also praised and his sentimental comedies The School for Lovers (1762) and The Trip to Scotland (1770) were successful.

After being appointed Poet Laureate, Whitehead defended the poetry of Laureates in a comic poem "A Pathetic Apology for All Laureates, Past, Present, And To Come". He was conscientious and saw himself as a non-partisan representative for the whole country. Astonishingly for a political appointee, he appeared to see no requirement "to defend the King or support the government". Sadly, this reflects the idea that the Laureate's influence had weakened so much that the official poems were unlikely to influence opinions, even though the times were important politically, with rebellion in the American colonies and war in Europe.

For some 28 years in this post, he contented himself in writing the obligatory verse, avoiding flattery and domestic politics, and bolstering Britain’s place in world affairs. Indeed, he was the first laureate to see past court and party divisions and speak of the ‘spirit of England’. The odes Whitehead wrote in his capacity as Poet Laureate, however, were ridiculed. Charles Churchill attacked him in 1762, in the third book of The Ghost, as "the heir of Dullness and Method".

Whitehead's works were collected in two volumes in 1774. A third, including a memoir by William Mason, appeared posthumously in 1788. His plays are printed in Bell's British Theatre (vols. 3, 7, 20) and other collections, and his poems appear in Alexander Chalmers's Works of the English Poets (vol. 17) and similar compilations.

== Poem – The Je Ne Sais Quoi ==
The Je Ne Sais Quoi

YES, I'm in love, I feel it now,

And Cælia has undone me;

And yet I'll swear I can't tell how

The pleasing plague stole on me.

'Tis not her face that love creates,

For there no graces revel;

'Tis not her shape, for there the fates

Have rather been uncivil.

'Tis not her air, for sure in that

There's nothing more than common;

And all her sense is only chat

Like any other woman.

Her voice, her touch, might give th' alarm--

'Twas both perhaps, or neither;

In short, 'twas that provoking charm

Of Cælia altogether.

== Notes ==
Court offices
Preceded by Colley Cibber	Poet Laureate; 1757–1785	Succeeded by Thomas Warton
