= Smock Alley Theatre =

Theatre in Dublin, Ireland

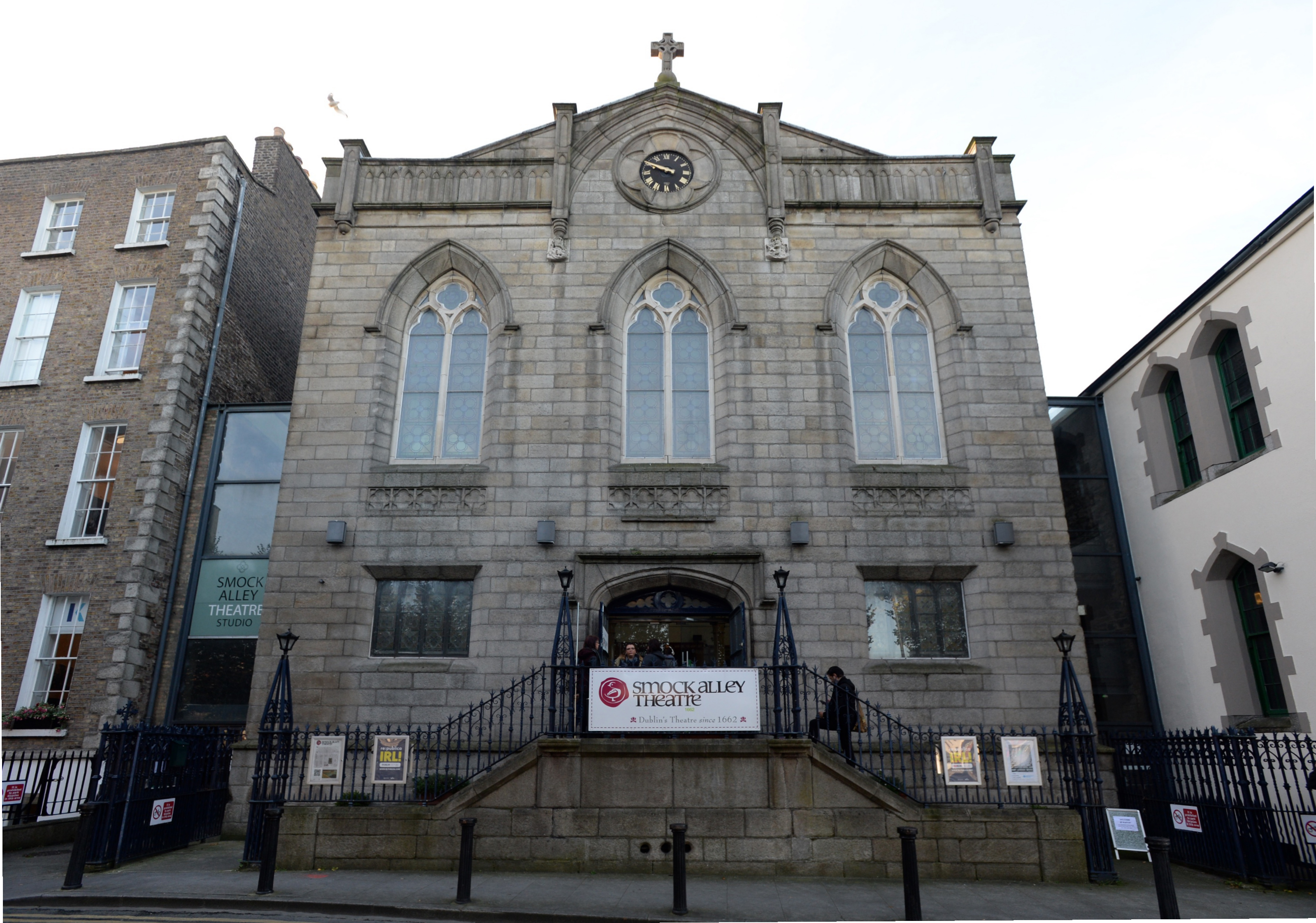

- Location within Central Dublin
- Address: 6/7 Exchange Street Lower; Dublin 8 Ireland
- Coordinates: 53.345068°N 6.2695543°W
- Type: theatre

Construction
- Opened: 2012
- Years active: 2012 to present

Website
- smockalley.com

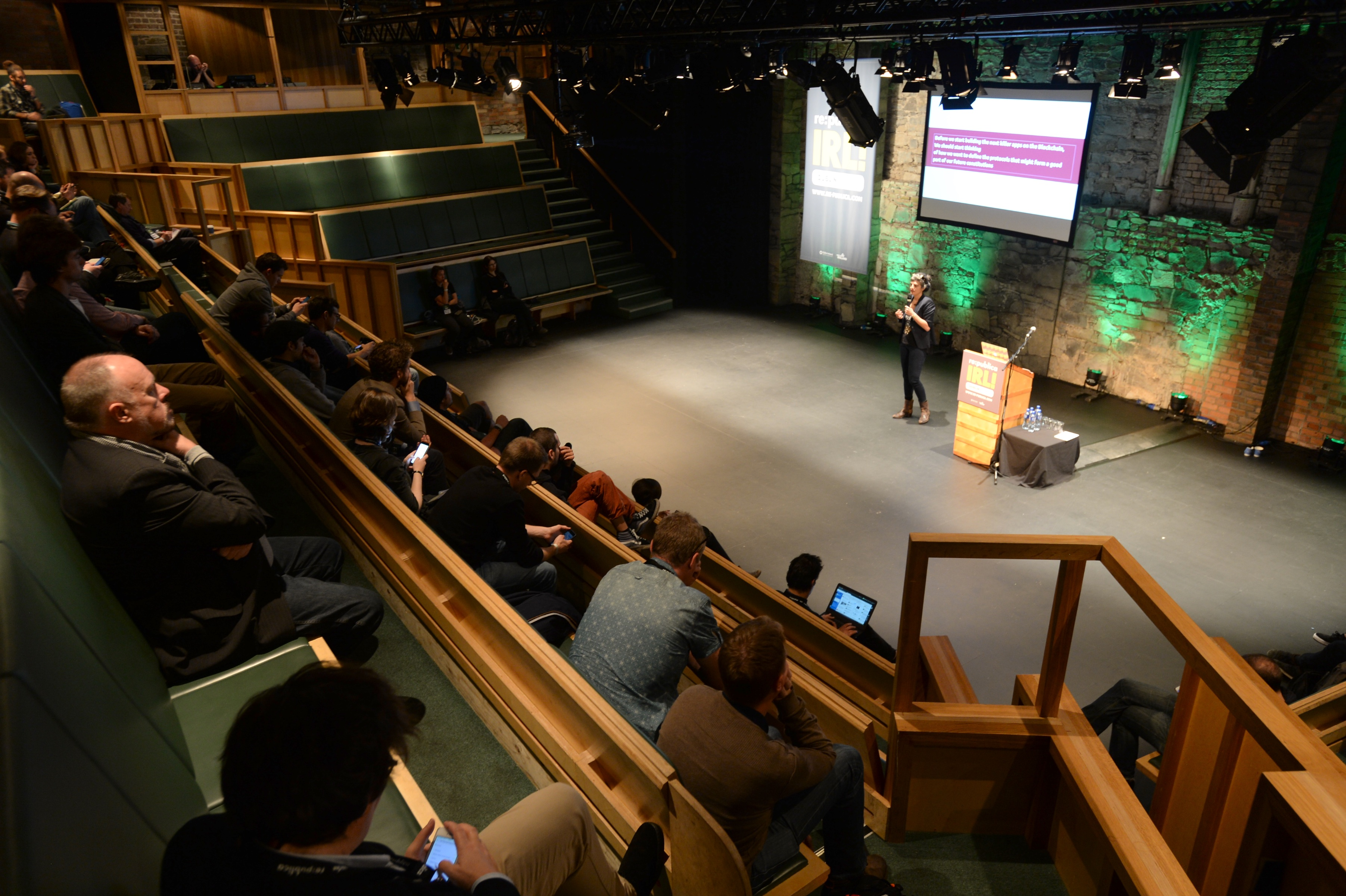
Main stage

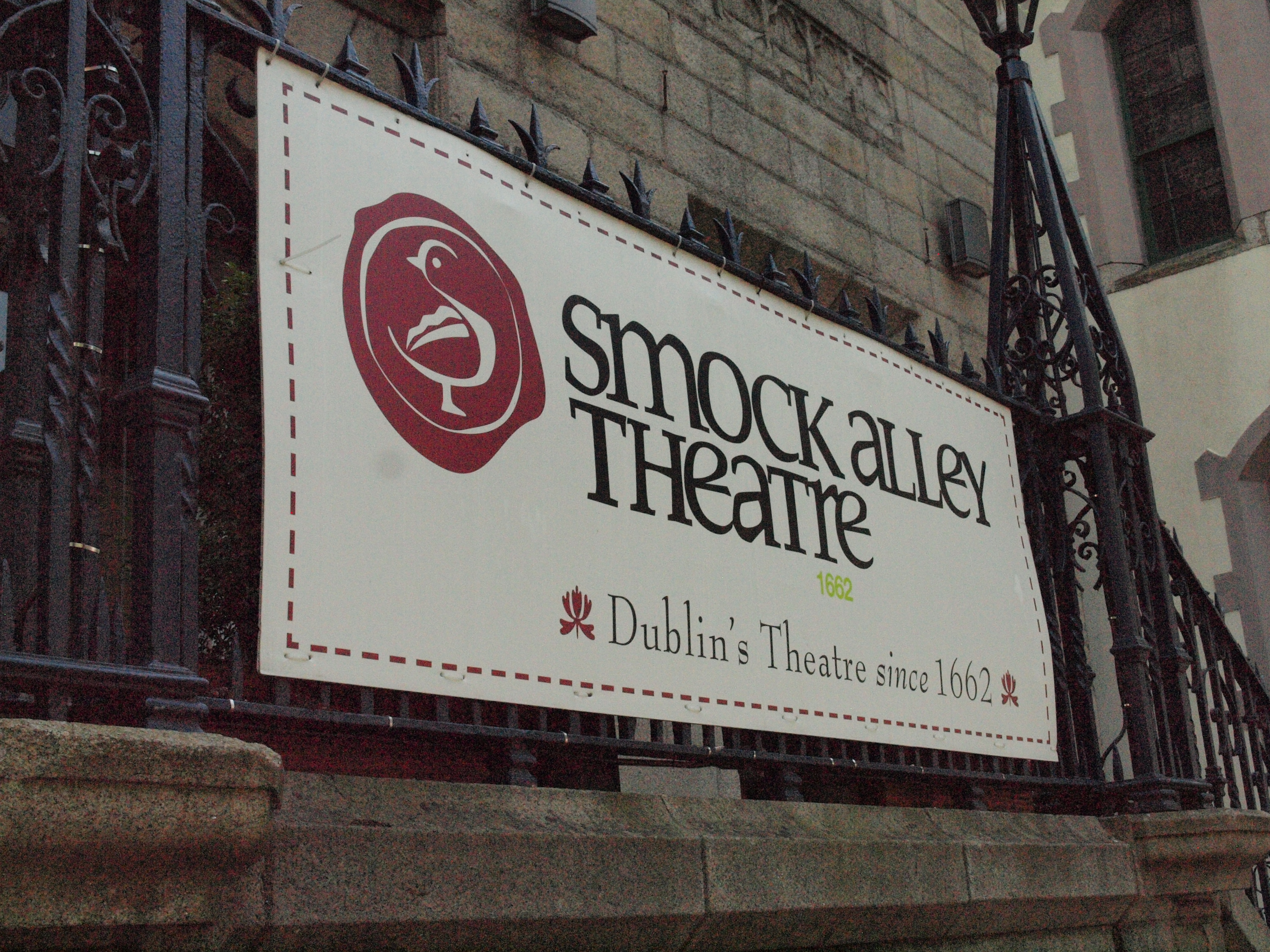
Smock Alley Theatre sign

Since the 17th century, there have been numerous theatres in Dublin with the name Smock Alley.

The current Smock Alley Theatre (Irish: Amharclann Scabhat Smock) is a 21st-century theatre in Dublin, converted from a 19th-century church building, incorporating structural material from an 18th-century theatre building, and built on the site of the 17th century Theatre Royal, Dublin. The present theatre was opened in 2012, after a €3.5 million investment.

The Smock Alley Theatre site comprises Smock Alley Theatre (177 seats), The Boys School (60 - 100 capacity), Black Box (80 capacity), and The Banquet Hall (150 capacity).

== History of the building ==
=== Theatre Royal ===
The first Theatre Royal was opened on the site by John Ogilby in 1662. Ogilby, who was the first Irish Master of the Revels, had previously run the New Theatre in Werburgh Street, which had closed during the Puritan interregnum. This building was entirely demolished, with a new theatre replacing it in 1735. This second building was active as a theatre until 1759, with a brief later revival until its final closure in 1787.

==== First building (1662) ====
The Theatre Royal consisted of a classical proscenium stage, pit, boxes, a middle and upper gallery, lattices (which were a type of box peculiar to Dublin) and a music/orchestra loft above the stage, also the acoustics were said to be excellent. The pit had backless benches and a raked floor that rose toward the back of the audience to help sightlines. Mostly single men sat here, and it was the noisiest, rowdiest area in the theatre. Boxes sat upper-class aristocrats.

Boxes were luxuriously decorated with velvet drapes should the occupants require some privacy during the evening, for whatever reason. The doors were wider in the boxes to allow access to the voluminous dresses of the ladies. Galleries held the lower class, including servants of the upper classes in attendance. These were the worst seats as they were on the same level as the large chandeliers that lit the theatre. Candles were made of tallow and they were very pungent and smokey.

The building was built on reclaimed ground from the River Liffey and due to this, in 1670 and later in 1701 the upper galleries collapsed killing several people inside and injuring many more including the son of the Lord Lieutenant of Ireland, Charles Earl of Middlesex. He was pulled from the wreckage of his box with two broken legs

There was another partial collapse in March 1734 after which it was abandoned for a short while. The major decision was then taken to demolish and rebuild the theatre in 1735 with increased audience capacity.

==== Second building (1735) ====
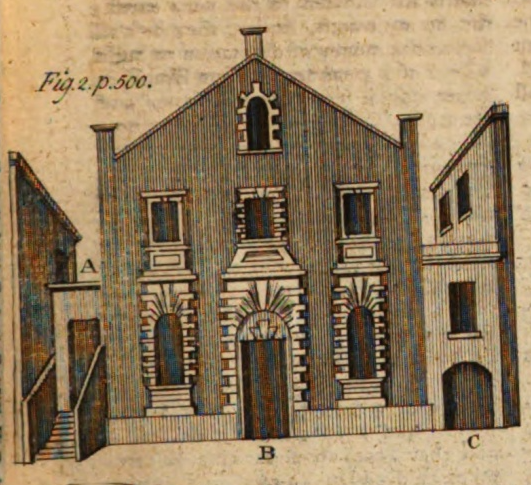
Smock Alley Theatre to a design of Michael Wills from a 1789 illustration.

A new theatre was opened in December 1735 to a design of the architect Michael Wills in a Georgian style.

In the time between the demolition of the original theatre and the construction of its replacement, a new theatre had opened in Aungier Street and it managed to wrestle the title Theatre Royal from Smock Alley for a time. In 1745 Thomas Sheridan, godson of Jonathan Swift, took on the role of manager of Smock Alley and Aungier Street. He made many improvements and reclaimed the title Theatre Royal for Smock Alley. By 1750 the Aungier Street theatre had closed down. Sheridan was not only the director of the theatre, he was also a playwright and strove to improve audiences at the theatre by cleaning up the neighbourhood in which it stood. At the time there were many unsavoury taverns and alehouses as well as many establishments of ill repute that Sheridan successfully petitioned to have closed down in favour of more wholesome and decent businesses. This change in the area encouraged more noble people to return to the theatre and it once again thrived.

Benjamin Victor was an Englishman who originally visited Ireland in an effort to extend his textile business, but that did not prove profitable, and he eventually gave it up. On 11 October 1746, Victor settled with his family in Dublin as treasurer and deputy manager to Sheridan at the Smock Alley Theatre. The theatre was for some years fairly successful; but about 1753 Sheridan was at variance with a portion of the theatre-going public, and for two years Victor and John Sowdon, a principal actor in the company, took over its management. On 15 July 1755 Sheridan returned to Dublin, and Victor resumed his old position. Eventually, the theatre was closed on 20 April 1759, and Victor returned to England. The theatre later reopened, being active until 1787, but Victor did not return - having become involved with the Drury Lane Theatre in his native London.

==== Legacy ====
The first Theatre Royal housed the plays of George Farquhar (The Recruiting Officer/The Beaux Stratagem), Oliver Goldsmith (She Stoops to Conquer) and Richard Brinsley Sheridan, son of Thomas Sheridan (The Rivals/School for Scandal). It was here that the stars of world theatre appeared to much acclaim such as Peg Woffington, Thomas Sheridan, Spranger Barry and Charles Macklin. It was on the stage of Smock Alley Theatre that David Garrick, the greatest actor of the 18th century, first played Hamlet. It was the first time Hamlet had ever been staged in Ireland and some 3,000 customers clambered to get one of only 300 tickets.

It was also the site of some infamous 18th-century Dublin riots, the most serious being the Kelly riots of 1747. Thomas Sheridan was the manager at the time and had recently banned the presence of audience members on stage and the taking of money for the privilege of going backstage. These rules were for men only. Indeed, it was under Charles II that the law was changed to even allow women to act on stage. These rules were severely tested by a very drunk Trinity College student named Richard Kelly. Kelly did not appreciate the new rules restricting access backstage and brazenly went backstage.

=== St Michael and John's Church (1815) ===
In 1758, another rival theatre opened, and eventually, the Theatre Royal at Smock Alley closed in 1787. After this, the building was used as a whiskey store, falling into heavy disrepair before purchase by Fr Michael Blake in 1811.

The structure of the derelict building was partially demolished, and the new church incorporated some of this original theatre structure into its own during the building work, which was carried out between 1811 and 1815. The resultant new building was named St Michael and John's Church, after the medieval churches of St Michael of the Hill (now Dublinia) and St John of Booth Street (Fishamble Street). It had a famous stained glass window that is now in Swords. The theatre still boasts ornate stained glass windows and ceiling plasterwork which dates from the turn of the 20th century.

When the bell tolled in 1811, 18 years before Catholic Emancipation; it was the first Catholic bell to ring in Dublin in nearly 300 years. This prompted the aldermen of the city to bring charges against Fr Blake, though these charges were dropped when young lawyer Daniel O'Connell came to his defence.

In 1989, due to falling numbers of parishioners, the church of St Michael and John was deconsecrated. It was then redeveloped (part of the Temple Bar rejuvenation scheme) into the 'Viking Adventure' which was closed down in 2002.

=== Excavation ===
In 2009, a full archaeological excavation took place under Margaret Gowan Archaeology. The dig revealed part of the foundations from the first theatre on the site built in 1662 and the full basement and foundation plan of the 1735 theatre.

A total of 229 artefacts were recovered from the excavations, these included medieval and post-medieval pottery, glass finds (mostly wine bottles), clay tobacco-pipe fragments, an actor's wig curler, a medieval roof tile, fragments of mosaic floor and many oyster shells, remnants of the building's theatrical past.
