= Smedley =

Smedley can refer to:

== People ==
=== Given name ===
- Smedley Butler (1881–1940), U.S. Marine Corps major general, double recipient of the Medal of Honor
- Smedley Crooke (1861–1951), British politician
- Smedley Darlington (1827–1899), American politician

=== Surname ===
- Agnes Smedley (1892–1950), American journalist and writer
- Audrey Smedley (1930–2020), American social anthropologist
- Bert Smedley (1905–unknown), Australian rules footballer
- Brian Smedley (1934–2007), British judge
- Cameron Smedley (born 1990), Canadian canoeist
- Edward Smedley (1788–1836), English clergyman and writer
- Elizabeth Anna Hart (1822–1890), née Smedley, British poet and novelist
- Emma Smedley (1868–1944), American dietitian, school lunch supervisor
- Eric Smedley (born 1973), former professional American football player
- Francis Edward Smedley (1818–1864), English novelist and writer
- Harold Smedley (1920–2004), British diplomat
- Hugh Smedley, New Zealand rower
- John Smedley (disambiguation)
- Jonathan Smedley (1671–1729), Anglo-Irish churchman and polemicist
- Karen Smedley (born 1972), American professional wrestling valet
- Kayla Bashore Smedley (born 1983), American field hockey player
- Larry E. Smedley (1949–1967), United States Marine corporal, posthumous recipient of the Medal of Honor in Vietnam
- Menella Bute Smedley (1820–1877), English novelist and poet
- Michael Smedley (born 1941), English cricketer
- Oliver Smedley (1911–1989), English businessman and activist
- Peter Smedley (1943–2011), Australian businessman
- Ralph C. Smedley (1878–1965), American teacher and YMCA director who founded Toastmasters International
- Rob Smedley (born 1973), English engineer for F1 driver Felipe Massa
- Robert Smedley (born 1963), American professional wrestler
- Samuel Smedley (1753–1812), American Revolutionary War ship captain
- Tommy Shannon (born Thomas Smedley; 1946), American musician
- William Thomas Smedley (1858–1920), American artist

=== Pseudonym ===
- Smedley, reported to have been closely involved with the founding of the darknet market Silk Road

== Places ==
- Smedley, Manchester, an area in north Manchester, England
- Smedley, Indiana, an unincorporated community, United States
- Smedley, Virginia, an unincorporated community, United States

== Other uses ==
- Smedley Elementary School, Philadelphia, Pennsylvania, United States, a charter school on the National Register of Historic Places
- Smedley, a character in the Chilly Willy animated cartoon
