= John Davies (classical scholar, born 1679) =

English cleric and academic (1679–1732)

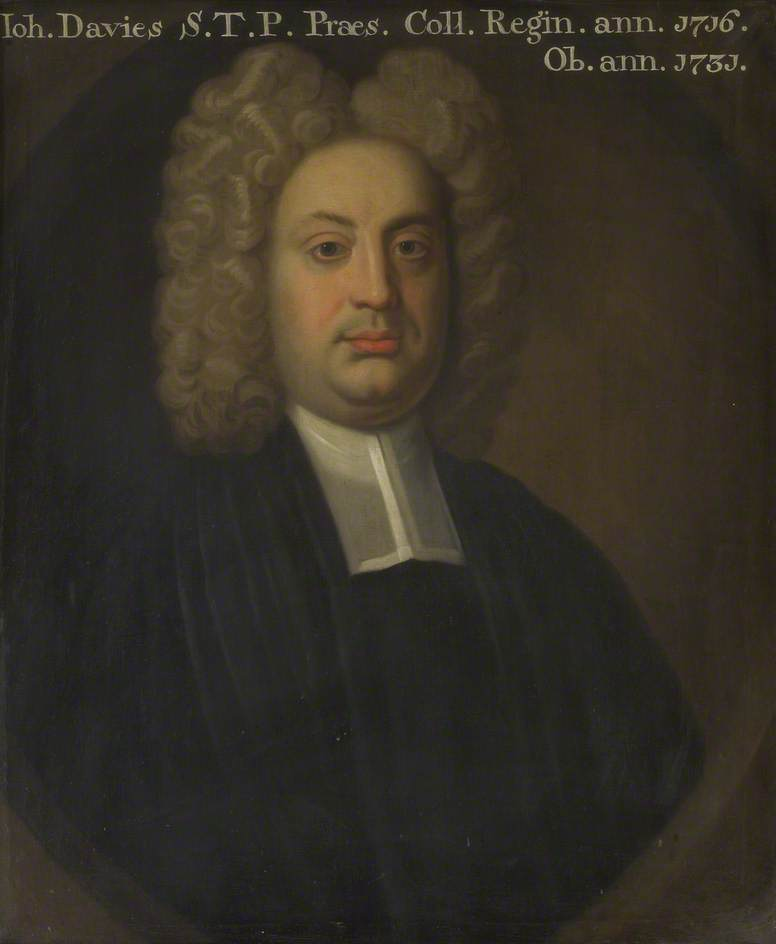
John Davies

John Davies (1679–1732) was an English cleric and academic, known as a classical scholar, and President of Queens' College, Cambridge from 1717.

== Life ==
He was born in London on 22 April 1679. His father was a merchant or tradesman in that city, who died while he was young, and his mother a daughter of Sir John Turton, knight, justice of the court of king's bench. He was educated at Charterhouse School, and on 8 June 1695 was admitted to Queens' College, Cambridge. He graduated B.A. in 1698, was elected a fellow of the college 7 July 1701, and commenced M.A. in 1702.

In 1709 Davies was junior proctor of the university. He was collated in 1711 by John Moore, the bishop of Ely, to the rectory of Fen Ditton, near Cambridge, and to a prebend in Ely Cathedral. In the same year he took the degree of LL.D. On the death of Dr. Henry James he was chosen to succeed him as president of Queens' College, 23 March 1717.

Davies was created D.D. in 1717, when George I visited Cambridge. In 1718 he resigned the rectory of Glemsford in Suffolk, a benefice in the bishop of Ely's patronage. A close friend of Richard Bentley, he nevertheless condemned Bentley's behaviour in his acrimonious dispute with the university.

In 1725 Davies was elected vice-chancellor of the university. He died at Fen Ditton on 7 March 1732, and was buried in Queens' College chapel.

== Works ==
Davies published editions of Greek and Latin authors:

- ‘Maximi Tyrii dissertationes, Gr. et Lat. ex interpretatione Heinsii,’ 1703.
- ‘C. Julii Cæsaris [et A. Hirtii] quæ extant omnia,’ Cambridge, 1706 and 1727.
- ‘M. Minucii Felicis Octavius. Accedit Commodianus, ævi Cyprianici scriptor,’ Cambridge, 1707 and 1712.

He planned new editions of Cicero's philosophical treatises, to add to the works edited by Grævius, and published the ‘Tusculanarum disputationum libri quinque,’ Cambridge, 1709, and again in 1723, 1730, and 1738, with the emendations of Bentley. The other pieces appeared at Cambridge in the following order:

- ‘De Naturâ Deorum,’ 1718, 1723, 1733;
- ‘De Divinatione et de Fato,’ 1721, 1730;
- ‘Academica, 1725, 1736;
- ‘De Legibus,’ 1727;
- ‘De Finibus Bonorum et Malorum,’ 1728, 1741.

Davies had also gone as far as the middle of the third book of Cicero's De Officiis when he died. His will passed the task to Richard Mead, who put it into the hands of Thomas Bentley; but the manuscript was burnt.

- ‘Lactantii Firmiani epitome divinarum institutionum ad Pentadium fratrem,’ Cambridge, 1718.

Styan Thirlby, in the preface to his edition of Justin Martyr (1722), acknowledged the assistance of Davies, and printed his notes.

== Notes ==
Attribution

This article incorporates text from a publication now in the public domain: Stephen, Leslie, ed. (1888). "Davies, John (1679-1732)". Dictionary of National Biography. Vol. 14. London: Smith, Elder & Co.
