= Smedley-Aston =

Smedley-Aston is a surname. Notable people with the surname include:

- Brian Smedley-Aston, editor of the 1967 British film The Shuttered Room
- Michael Smedley-Aston (1912–2006), British film producer, son of William Smedley-Aston
- William Smedley-Aston (1868–1941), British photographer and artist

== See also ==
- Smedley (disambiguation)
- Aston (name)
