= James Pitt =

James Pitt was an 18th-century English journalist and deist.

James Pitt (fl. 1714 – 1755) was a former schoolmaster who, under the pen name of "Francis Osborne," wrote political propaganda for the Whig government. He also wrote many Christian deist articles under the pen names "Socrates" and "Publicola." These articles were lead articles and often the only original articles in one of England's most popular newspapers, the London Journal. Pitt's paper sold 5,000 copies a week, and because of the way newspapers were consumed in that time, it has been estimated he may have been read or heard by as many as a hundred-thousand people each week. Furthermore, many of his Christian deist writings were republished in Benjamin Franklin's American newspaper.

Pitt was a Christian deist, and in many of his articles for the London Journal, he expressed the most important points of Christian deism.

Pitt was buried 23 January 1763 at Hampstead. "Mr. Pitt, who died at his house in Essex-street at the age of 84, had formerly been editor of one of the periodical papers in favor of Sir Robert Walpole, and is supposed to be the person alluded to in the Dunciad under the name of Mother Osborne." Some letters of Mr. Pitt's are printed in Dr. Howard's Collection.
