= The Dunciad =

Poem by Alexander Pope

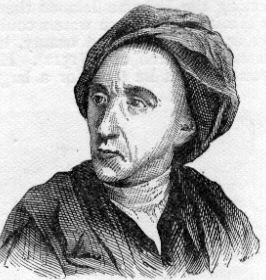
Alexander Pope, author of The Dunciad

The Dunciad (/ˈdʌnsi.æd/) is a landmark, mock-heroic, narrative poem by Alexander Pope published in three different versions at different times from 1728 to 1743. The poem celebrates a goddess, Dulness, and the progress of her chosen agents as they bring decay, imbecility, and tastelessness to the Kingdom of Great Britain.

== Versions ==
The first version – the "three-book" Dunciad – was published in 1728 anonymously. The second version, the Dunciad Variorum, was published anonymously in 1729. The New Dunciad, in a new fourth book conceived as a sequel to the previous three, appeared in 1742, and The Dunciad in Four Books, a revised version of the original three books and a slightly revised version of the fourth book with revised commentary, was published in 1743 with a new character, Bays, replacing Theobald as the "hero".

== Origins ==
Pope told Joseph Spence (in Spence's Anecdotes) that he had been working on a general satire of Dulness, with characters of contemporary Grub Street scribblers, for some time and that it was the publication of Shakespeare Restored by Lewis Theobald that spurred him to complete the poem and publish it in 1728.

Part of Pope's bitter inspiration for the characters in the book comes from his soured relationship with the royal court. The Princess of Wales Caroline of Ansbach, wife of George II, had supported Pope in her patronage of the arts. When she and her husband came to the throne in 1727 she had a much busier schedule and thus had less time for Pope, who saw this oversight as a personal slight against him. When planning the Dunciad he based the character Dulness on Queen Caroline, as the fat, lazy and dull wife. The King of the Dunces as the son of Dulness was based on George II. Pope makes his views on the first two Georgian kings very clear in the Dunciad when he writes "Still Dunce the second reigns like Dunce the first".

However, Pope's reputation had been impugned, as the full title of Theobald's edition was Shakespeare restored, or, A specimen of the many errors, as well committed, as unamended, by Mr. Pope: in his late edition of this poet. Designed not only to correct the said edition, but to restore the true reading of Shakespeare in all the editions ever yet published.

Pope had written characters of the various "Dunces" prior to 1728. In his "Essay on Criticism", Pope describes some critics of a witless nature. In his various Moral Epistles, Pope likewise constructs characters of contemporary authors of poor taste. The general structure owes its origins to the communal project of the Scriblerians and other similar works such as the mock-heroic MacFlecknoe by John Dryden and Pope's own The Rape of the Lock.

The Scriblerian club most consistently comprised Jonathan Swift, John Gay, John Arbuthnot, Robert Harley, and Thomas Parnell. The group met during the spring and summer of 1714. One group project was to write a satire of contemporary abuses in learning of all sorts, in which the authors would combine their efforts to write the biography of the group's fictional founder, Martin Scriblerus, through whose writings they would accomplish their satirical aims. The resulting The Memoirs of Martin Scriblerus contained a number of parodies of the most lavish mistakes in scholarship.

For the mock-heroic structure of the Dunciad itself, however, the idea seems to have come most clearly from MacFlecknoe. MacFlecknoe is a poem celebrating the apotheosis of Thomas Shadwell, whom Dryden nominates as the dullest poet of the age. Shadwell is the spiritual son of Flecknoe, an obscure Irish poet of low fame, and he takes his place as the favourite of the goddess Dulness.

Pope takes this idea of the personified goddess of Dulness being at war with reason, darkness at war with light, and extends it to a full Aeneid parody. His poem celebrates a war, rather than a mere victory, and a process of ignorance, and Pope picks, as his champions of all things insipid, Lewis Theobald (1728 and 1732) and Colley Cibber (1742).

Jean-Pierre de Crousaz, who wrote a biting commentary on Pope's Essay on Man, found that Pope had "reserved a place for him in the Dunciad".

== The three-book Dunciad A and the Dunciad Variorum ==
=== Publication ===
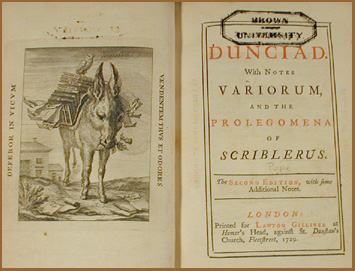
Frontispiece and front page to The Dunciad Variorum (1729).

Pope first published The Dunciad in 1728 in three books, with Lewis Theobald as its "hero". The poem was not signed, and he used only initials in the text to refer to the various Dunces in the kingdom of Dulness. However, "Keys" immediately came out to identify the figures mentioned in the text, and an Irish pirate edition was printed that filled in the names (sometimes inaccurately). Additionally, the men attacked by Pope also wrote angry denunciations of the poem, attacking Pope's poetry and person. Pope endured attacks from, among others, George Duckett, Thomas Burnet, and Richard Blackmore. All of these, however, were less vicious than the attack launched by Edmund Curll, a notoriously unscrupulous publisher, who produced his own pirate copy of the Dunciad with astounding swiftness, and also published "The Popiad" and a number of pamphlets attacking Pope.

Pope issued the first authorised Dunciad with commentary as The Dunciad. With Notes Variorum in 1729. A re-issue of the same text—now bound up with a long prolegomenon and additional prefatory matter—appeared in his collected Works, vol. V, in 1732. Although the poem itself was little altered, the 1729/1732 Variorum supplies an extensive apparatus of mock-scholarship; for example, the ‘Letter to the Publisher’ is signed “William Cleland” but was almost certainly written by Pope. The Variorum also introduces several new targets by name, among them James Ralph, whom Pope ridicules in Book III, lines 165–166:

Silence, ye Wolves! while Ralph to Cynthia howls
And makes Night hideous—Answer him, ye Owls!

In these prefatory materials, Pope points out that the Keys were often wrong about the allusions, and he explains his reluctance at spelling out the names. He says that he wishes to avoid elevating the targets of the satire by mentioning their names (which, of course, did happen, as a number of persons are only remembered for their appearances in the poem), but he similarly did not want innocents to be mistaken for the targets. Pope also apologises for using parody of the Classics (for his poem imitates both Homer and Virgil) by pointing out that the ancients also used parody to belittle unworthy poets. Pope's preface is followed by advertisements from the bookseller, a section called "Testimonies of Authors Concerning Our Poet and his Works" by "Martinus Scriblerus", and a further section named "Martinus Scriblerus, of the Poem".

Martinus Scriblerus was a corporate identity employed by Pope and the other members of the Scriblerians. Therefore, these two portions of the preface could have been written by any of its members, but they, like the other prefatory materials, were most likely written by Pope himself. The various Dunces had written responses to Pope after the first publication of The Dunciad, and they had not only written against Pope, but had explained why Pope had attacked other writers. In the "Testimonies" section, Martinus Scriblerus culls all the comments the Dunces made about each other in their replies and sets them side by side, so that each is condemned by another. He also culls their contradictory characterisations of Pope, so that they seem to all damn and praise the same qualities over and over again.

The "Testimonies" also includes commendations from Pope's friends. The words of Edward Young, James Thomson and Jonathan Swift are brought together to praise Pope specifically for being temperate and timely in his charges. The conclusion asks the reader "to chuse whether thou wilt incline to the Testimonies of Authors avowed" (like Pope's friends) "or of Authors concealed" (like many of the Dunces) – in short, "of those who knew him, or of those who knew him not".

=== "Tibbald" King of Dunces ===
Alexander Pope had a proximal, close and long term cause for choosing Lewis Theobald as the King of Dunces for the first version of the Dunciad. The immediate cause was Theobald's publication of Shakespeare Restored, or a Specimen of the many Errors as well Committed as Unamended by Mr Pope in his late edition of this poet; designed not only to correct the said Edition, but to restore the true Reading of Shakespeare in all the Editions ever published in 1726. Pope had published his own version of Shakespeare in 1725, and he had made a number of errors in it. He had "smoothed" some of Shakespeare's lines, had chosen readings that eliminated puns (which Pope regarded as low humour), and had, indeed, missed several good readings and preserved some bad ones. In the Dunciad Variorum, Pope complains that he had put out newspaper advertisements when he was working on Shakespeare, asking for anyone with suggestions to come forward, and that Theobald had hidden all of his material. Indeed, when Pope produced a second edition of his Shakespeare in 1728, he incorporated many of Theobald's textual readings.

Pope, however, had already a quarrel with Theobald. The first mention of Theobald in Pope's writings is the 1727 "Peri Bathous", in Miscellanies, The Last Volume (which was the third volume), but Pope's attack there shows that Theobald was already a figure of fun. Regardless of the quarrels, though, Theobald was, in a sense, the nearly perfect King of Dunces. The Dunciad's action concerns the gradual sublimation of all arts and letters into Dulness by the action of hireling authors. Theobald, as a man who had attempted the stage and failed, plagiarised a play, attempted translation and failed to such a degree that John Dennis referred to him as a "notorious Ideot", attempted subscription translation and failed to produce, and who had just turned his full attention to political attack writing, was an epitome, for Pope, of all that was wrong with British letters. Additionally, Pope's goddess of Dulness begins the poem already controlling state poetry, odes, and political writing, so Theobald as King of Dunces is the man who can lead her to control the stage as well. Theobald's writings for John Rich, in particular, are singled out within the Dunciad as abominations for their mixing of tragedy and comedy and their "low" pantomime and opera; they are not the first to bring the Smithfield muses to the ears of kings, but they ferried them over in bulk.

=== Dulness ===
Dulness is the goddess who presides over The Dunciad. She is the central character, introduced at the start of the work. Dulness is the daughter of Chaos and "eternal Night", and her mission is to convert all the world to stupidity ("To hatch a new Saturnian age, of Lead"). Her triumph is part of the translatio stultitia (the inverse of the translatio studii). As "enlightenment" moves ever westward, darkness follows behind. In Pope's poem, she already has control of all political writing and seeks to extend her reign to drama. Hence, she chooses as a champion Lewis Theobald (Dunciad A) and Colley Cibber (Dunciad B).

Pope presents the power of Dulness as inexorable and irresistible, and in Book IV of the Dunciad B he asks only that she pause a moment to let him write his poem before she takes "the singer and the song" into her oblivion. She is not motivated by any particular malice, and she even shows mercy at one point, if being reduced to insensibility is mercy, for, when a deflowered nun comes before her, she drops her cloak of shamelessness over the ruined woman. Instead, she has an essential antipathy toward learning and independent thinking, and, for Pope, loss of the ability to discern, to think, and to appreciate is a living death and the license of all evil.

For Pope, who was a Roman Catholic, absolute monarchy, foreign language opera, flattery, the replacement of sound architecture for politically well placed hacks, the redesign of good (classically ordered) buildings, and the money grubbing of what would now be called the tabloid press are all signs of the triumph of Dulness over reason and light. Each of these things represents choosing the less thoughtful over the more rational choice, each requires credulity and acceptance over curiosity and independence, and therefore Pope blames, at least as much as any agent of Dulness, an indifferent and uneducated public.

=== Overview of the three-book Dunciad ===
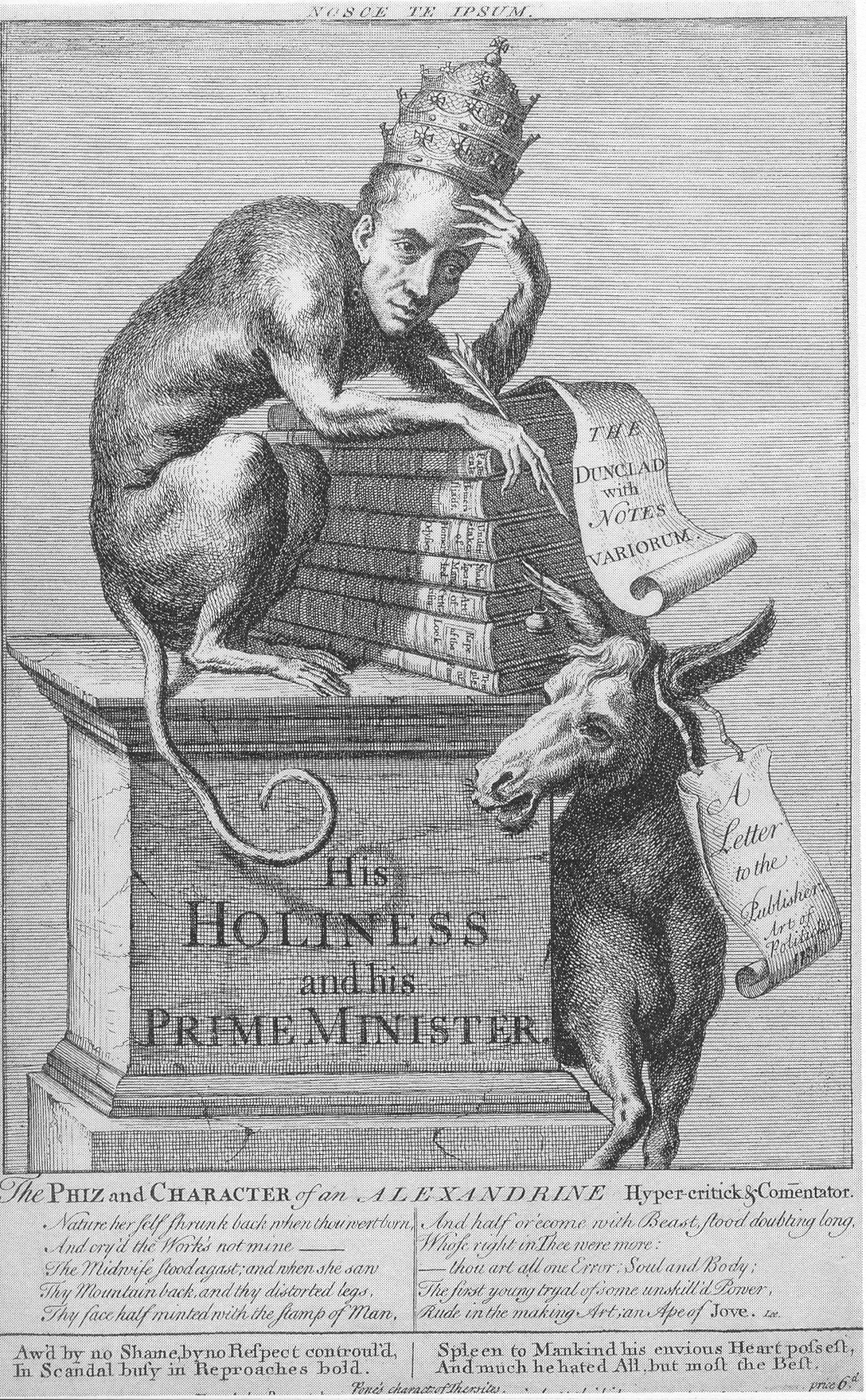
A satirical print against Pope from Pope Alexander (1729). The print was also sold separately. It shows Pope as a monkey, because the satirist calls him by the letters "A--- P—E" selected from his name. The monkey sits atop a stack of Pope's works and wears a papal tiara (referring to Pope's Roman Catholicism, a minority Christian denomination at that place and time). The Latin motto at the top means "Know thyself", and the verse at the bottom is Pope's own satire on Thersites from his translation of the Iliad. This was only one of many attacks on Pope after the Dunciad Variorum.

The central premise of the poem is the same as that of MacFlecknoe: the crowning of a new King of Dulness. However, Pope's poem is far more wide-ranging and specific than Dryden's had been. His satire is political and cultural in very specific ways. Rather than merely lambasting "vice" and "corruption", Pope attacks very particular degradations of political discourse and particular degradations of the arts.

The political attack is on the Whigs, and specifically on the Hanoverian Whigs. The poem opens, in fact, with the goddess Dulness noting that "Still Dunce the second rules like Dunce the first", which is an exceptionally daring reference to George II, who had come to the throne earlier in the year. Furthermore, although the King of Dunces, Theobald, writes for the radical Tory Mist's Journal, Pope consistently hammers at radical Protestant authors and controversialists. Daniel Defoe is mentioned almost as frequently as anyone in the poem, and the booksellers picked out for abuse both specialised in partisan Whig publications.

The cultural attack is broader than the political one, and it may underlie the whole. Pope attacks, over and over again, those who write for pay. While Samuel Johnson would say, half a century later, that no man but a blockhead ever wrote but for money, Pope's attack is not on those who get paid, but those who will write on cue for the highest bid. Pope himself was one of the earliest poets to make his living solely by writing, and so it is not the professional author, but the mercenary author that Pope derides. He attacks hired pens, the authors who perform poetry or religious writing for the greatest pay alone, who do not believe in what they are doing. As he puts it in book II, "He [a patron] chinks his purse, and takes his seat of state [among the poets] ... And instant, fancy feels th' imputed sense" (II 189, 192). He objects not to professional writers, but to hackney writers. His dunce booksellers will trick and counterfeit their way to wealth, and his dunce poets will wheedle and flatter anyone for enough money to keep the bills paid.

The plot of the poem is simple. Dulness, the goddess, appears at a Lord Mayor's Day in 1724 and notes that her king, Elkannah Settle, has died. She chooses Lewis Theobald as his successor. In honour of his coronation, she holds heroic games. He is then transported to the Temple of Dulness, where he has visions of the future. The poem has a consistent setting and time, as well. Book I covers the night after the Lord Mayor's Day, Book II the morning to dusk, and Book III the darkest night. Furthermore, the poem begins at the end of the Lord Mayor's procession, goes in Book II to the Strand, then to Fleet Street (where booksellers were), down by Bridewell Prison to the River Fleet, then to Ludgate at the end of Book II; in Book III, Dulness goes through Ludgate to the City of London to her temple.

== Content ==
=== The arguments of the three books ===
==== A Book I ====
The poem begins with an epic invocation, "Books and the Man I sing, the first who brings/ The Smithfield Muses to the Ear of Kings" (I 1–2) (Smithfield being the site of Bartholomew Fair entertainments, and the man in question was Elkanah Settle, who had written for Bartholomew Fair after the Glorious Revolution; Pope makes him the one who brought pantomime, farce, and monster shows to the royal theatres). The goddess Dulness notes that her power is so great that "Time himself stands still at her command, / Realms shift their place, and Ocean turns to land" (I 69-70), and thus claims credit for the routine violation of the Unities of Aristotle in poetry. On Lord Mayor's Day of 1724, when Sir George Thorold was Lord Mayor, Dulness announces the death of the current King of Dunces, Elkanah Settle. Settle had been the City Poet, and his job had been to commemorate Lord Mayor's Day pageants. Thanks to his hard work in stultifying the senses of the nation, Dulness claims control of all official verse, and all current poets are her subjects ("While pensive Poets painful vigils keep, / Sleepless themselves to give their readers sleep" I 91–92). She mentions Thomas Heywood, Daniel Defoe (for writing political journalism), Ambrose Philips, Nahum Tate, and Sir Richard Blackmore as her darlings. However, her triumph is not complete, and she aspires to control dramatic poetry as well as political, religious, and hack poetry. She therefore decides that Theobald will be the new King.

The action shifts to the library of Lewis Theobald, which is "A Gothic Vatican! of Greece and Rome / Well-purg'd, and worthy Withers, Quarles, and Blome" (I 125-126) (a Vatican Library for Northern European authors, and especially notable for vainglorious and contentious writing and criticism). Theobald is despairing of succeeding in writing dull poetry and plays, and he is debating whether to return to being a lawyer (for that had been Theobald's first trade) or to become a political hack. He decides to give up poetry and become an entirely hired pen for Nathaniel Mist and his Mist's Journal. He therefore collects all the books of bad poetry in his library along with his own works and makes a virgin sacrifice of them (virgin because no one has ever read them) by setting fire to the pile. The goddess Dulness appears to him in a fog and drops a sheet of Thule (a poem by Ambrose Philips that was supposed to be an epic, but which only appeared as a single sheet) on the fire, extinguishing it with the poem's perpetually wet ink. Dulness tells Theobald that he is the new King of Dunces and points him to the stage. She shows him,

How, with less reading than makes felons 'scape,
Less human genius than God gives an ape,
Small thanks to France and none to Rome or Greece,
A past, vamp'd, future, old, reviv'd, new piece,
'Twixt Plautus, Fletcher, Congreve, and Corneille,
Can make a Cibber, Johnson, or Ozell. (I 235–240)

The book ends with a hail of praise, calling Theobald now the new King Log (from Aesop's fable).

==== A Book II ====
Book II centres on the highly scatological "heroic games". Theobald sits on the throne of Dulness, which is a velveteen tub ("tub" being the common term for the pulpit of Dissenters), and Dulness declares the opening of heroic games to celebrate his coronation. Therefore, all her sons come before her on the Strand in London, leaving half the kingdom depopulated, for she summons both dull writers, their booksellers, and all who are stupid enough to patronise dull writers.

The first game is for booksellers. (Booksellers at the time purchased manuscripts from authors, and the proceeds from book sales went entirely to the bookseller, with the author getting no more than the advance price.) Dulness therefore decides upon a race for the booksellers. She creates a phantom Poet,

No meagre, muse-rid mope, adust and thin,
In a dun night-gown of his own loose skin. (II 33–34)

but, instead, a fat, well dressed poet (and therefore a wealthy, noble one who would command sales by his title). The phantom poet is named More, a reference to James Moore Smythe, who had plagiarised both Arbuthnot (Historico-physical Account of the South-Sea Bubble) and Pope (Memoirs of a Parish Clark), and whose only original play had been the failed The Rival Modes. The booksellers immediately set out running to be the first to grab Moore, with Bernard Lintot setting forth with a roar (Lintot had been James Moore Smythe's publisher), only to be challenged by Edmund Curll:

As when a dab-chick waddles thro' the copse,
On feet and wings, and flies, and wades, and hops;
So lab'ring on, with shoulders, hands, and head,
Wide as a windmill all his figure spread,
...
Full in the middle way there stood a lake,
Which Curl's Corinna chanc'd that morn to make,
(Such was her wont, at early down to drop
Her evening cates before his neighbour's shop,)
Here fortun'd Curl to slide; loud shout the band,
And Bernard! Bernard! rings thro' all the Strand. (II 59–62, 65-70)

The race seemingly having been decided by progress through bed-pan slops, Curll prays to Jove. The goddess Cloacina, ministering to Jove as he uses the toilet, hands him the petition of her votary, Curll. Jove's use of the paper catapults Curll to victory. As Curll grabs the phantom Moore, the poems it seemed to have fly back to their real authors, and even the clothes go to the unpaid tailors who had made them (James Moore Smythe had run through an inherited fortune and bankrupted himself by 1727). Dulness urges Curll to repeat the joke, to pretend to the public that his dull poets were really great poets, to print things by false names. (Curll had published numerous works by "Joseph Gay" to trick the public into thinking they were by John Gay.) For his victory, she awards Curll a tapestry showing the fates of famous Dunces. On it, he sees Daniel Defoe with his ears chopped off, John Tutchin being whipped publicly through western England, a political journalist subject to beatings for his scandalous publications, and himself being wrapped in a blanket and whipped by the schoolboys of Westminster (for having printed an unauthorised edition of the sermons of the school's master, thereby robbing the school's own printer).

The next contest Dulness proposes is for the poetess, Eliza (Eliza Haywood). She is compared to their Hera. Whereas Hera was "cow-eyed" in Iliad, and "of the herders", Haywood inverts these to become a

... Juno of majestic size,
With cow-like-udders, and with ox-like eyes. (II 155–156)

The booksellers will urinate to see whose urinary stream is the highest. Curll and Chetwood compete. Chetwood's efforts produce only a "curve at most," and he splashes his own face. Curll, on the other hand, produces a stream over his own head, burning (with an implied case of venereal disease) all the while. For this, Chetwood is awarded a jordan (chamber pot), while Curll gets Haywood's works and company.

The next contest is for authors, and it is the game of "tickling": getting money from patrons by flattery. A very wealthy nobleman, attended by jockeys, huntsmen, a large sedan chair with six porters, takes his seat. One poet attempts to flatter his pride. A painter attempts to paint a glowing portrait. An opera author attempts to please his ears. John Oldmixon simply asks for the money (Oldmixon had attacked Pope in The Catholic Poet, but Pope claims that his real crime was plagiarism in his Critical History of England, which slandered the Stuarts and got him an office from the Whig ministry), only to have the lord clench his money tighter. Finally, a young man with no artistic ability sends his sister to the lord and wins the prize.

In the next contest, Dulness offers up the prize of a "catcall" to the competitor whose chattering can put the Monkey tribe to shame, and a drum to the competitor who can drown out a braying ass. They are invited to add the noise of horns and trumpets to mustard-bowl thunder (as the sound effect of thunder on the stage had been made using a mustard bowl and a shot previously, and John Dennis had invented a new method) and a tolling bell (used in tragedies to enhance the pitiful action). Pope describes the resulting game thus:

'Twas chatt'ring, grinning, mouthing, jabb'ring all,
And Noise, and Norton, Brangling, and Breval,
Dennis and Dissonance; and captious Art,
And Snip-snap short, and Interruption smart.
"Hold (cry'd the Queen) A Catcall each shall win,
Equal your merits! equal is your din!" (II 229–234)

The critics are then invited to all bray at the same time. In this, Richard Blackmore wins easily:

All hail him victor in both gifts of Song,
Who sings so loudly, and who sings so long. (II 255–256)

(Blackmore had written six epic poems, a "Prince" and "King" Arthur, in twenty books, an Eliza in ten books, an Alfred in twelve books, etc. and had earned the nickname "Everlasting Blackmore". Additionally, Pope disliked his overuse of the verb "bray" for love and battle and so had chosen to have Blackmore's "bray" the most insistent.)

The assembled horde go down by Bridewell (the women's prison) between 11:00 am and 12:00 pm, when the women prisoners are being whipped, and go "To where Fleet-ditch with disemboguing streams/ Rolls the large tribute of dead dogs to Thames" (II 259-260). At the time, the River Fleet was the city's sewer outlet, where all of the gutters of the city washed into the river. It was silted, muddy, and mixed with river and city waters.

In the ditch, the political hacks are ordered to strip off their clothes and engage in a diving contest. Dulness says, "Who flings most filth, and wide pollutes around / The stream, be his the Weekly Journals, bound" (II 267–268), while a load of lead will go to the deepest diver and a load of coal to the others who participate. "The Weekly Journals" was a collective noun, referring to London Journal, Mist's Journal, British Journal, Daily Journal, etc. In this contest, John Dennis climbs up as high as a post and dives in, disappearing forever. Next, "Smedly" (Jonathan Smedley, a religious opportunist who criticised Jonathan Swift for gain) dives in and vanishes. Others attempt the task, but none succeed like Leonard Welsted (who had satirised Pope, Gay, and Arbuthnot's play Three Hours after Marriage in 1717), for he goes in swinging his arms like a windmill (to splash all with mud): "No crab more active in the dirty dance, / Downward to climb, and backward to advance" (II 298–299). He wins the Journals, but Smedly reappears, saying that he had gone all the way down to Hades, where he had seen that a branch of Styx flows into the Thames, so that all who drink city water grow dull and forgetful from Lethe.

Smedly becomes Dulness's high priest, and the company move to Ludgate. There, the young critics are asked to weigh the difference between Richard Blackmore and John "Orator" Henley. The one who can will be the chief judge of Dulness. Three second year students ("college sophs") from Cambridge University and three lawyers from Temple Bar attempt the task, but they all fall asleep. The entire company slowly falls asleep, with the last being Susanna Centlivre (who had attacked Pope's translation of Homer before its publication) and "Norton Defoe" (another false identity created by a political author who claimed to be the "true son" of Daniel Defoe). Finally, Folly herself is killed by the dullness of the works being read aloud. The result is, appropriately, that there is no judge for Dulness, for Dulness requires an absence of judgment.

==== A Book III ====
Book three is set in the Temple of Dulness in the city. Theobald sleeps with his head on the goddess's lap, with royal blue fogs surrounding him. In his dream, he goes to Hades and visits the shade of Elkannah Settle. There he sees millions of souls waiting for new bodies as their souls transmigrate. Bavius dips each soul in Lethe to make it dull before sending it to a new body. (In classical mythology, the souls of the dead were put into Lethe to forget their lives before passing on to their final reward, but these are dipped in Lethe before being born.) Elkannah Settle hails Theobald as the great promised one, the messiah of Dulness, for Bavius had dipped him over and over again, from lifetime to lifetime, before he was perfected in stupidity and ready to be born as Theobald. Theobald had formerly been a Boeotian, several Dutchmen, several monks, all before being himself: "All nonsense thus, of old or modern date, / Shall in thee centre, from thee circulate" (III 51–52).

Settle gives Theobald full knowledge of Dulness. This is his baptism: the time when he can claim his divine role and begin his mission (in a parody of Jesus being blessed by the Holy Spirit). Settle shows Theobald the past triumphs of Dulness in its battles with reason and science. He surveys the translatio stultitia: the Great Wall of China and the emperor burning all learned books, Egypt and Omar I burning the books in the Ptolemean library. Then he turns to follow the light of the sun/learning to Europe and says,

How little, mark! that portion of the ball,
Where, faint at best, the beams of Science fall.
Soon as they dawn, from Hyperborean skies,
Embody'd dark, what clouds of Vandals rise! (III 75–78)

Goths, Alans, Huns, Ostrogoths, Visigoths, and Islam are all seen as destroyers of learning. Christianity in the medieval period is also an enemy of learning and reason in Settle's view:

See Christians, Jews, one heavy sabbath keep;
And all the Western World believe and sleep. (III 91–92)

Pope lambasts the medieval popes for destroying statuary and books that depicted Classical gods and goddesses and for vandalising others, for making statues of Pan into Moses.

Settle then surveys the future. He says that Grub Street will be Dulness's Mount Parnassus, where the goddess will "Behold a hundred sons, and each a dunce" (III 130). He names two sons of contemporary dunces who were already showing signs of stupidity: Theophilus Cibber (III 134) and the son of Bishop Burnet.

Settle turns to examine the present state of "duncery", and this section of the third book is the longest. He first looks to literary critics, who are happiest when their authors complain the most. Scholars are described as:

A Lumberhouse of Books in ev'ry head,
For ever reading, never to be read. (III 189–90)

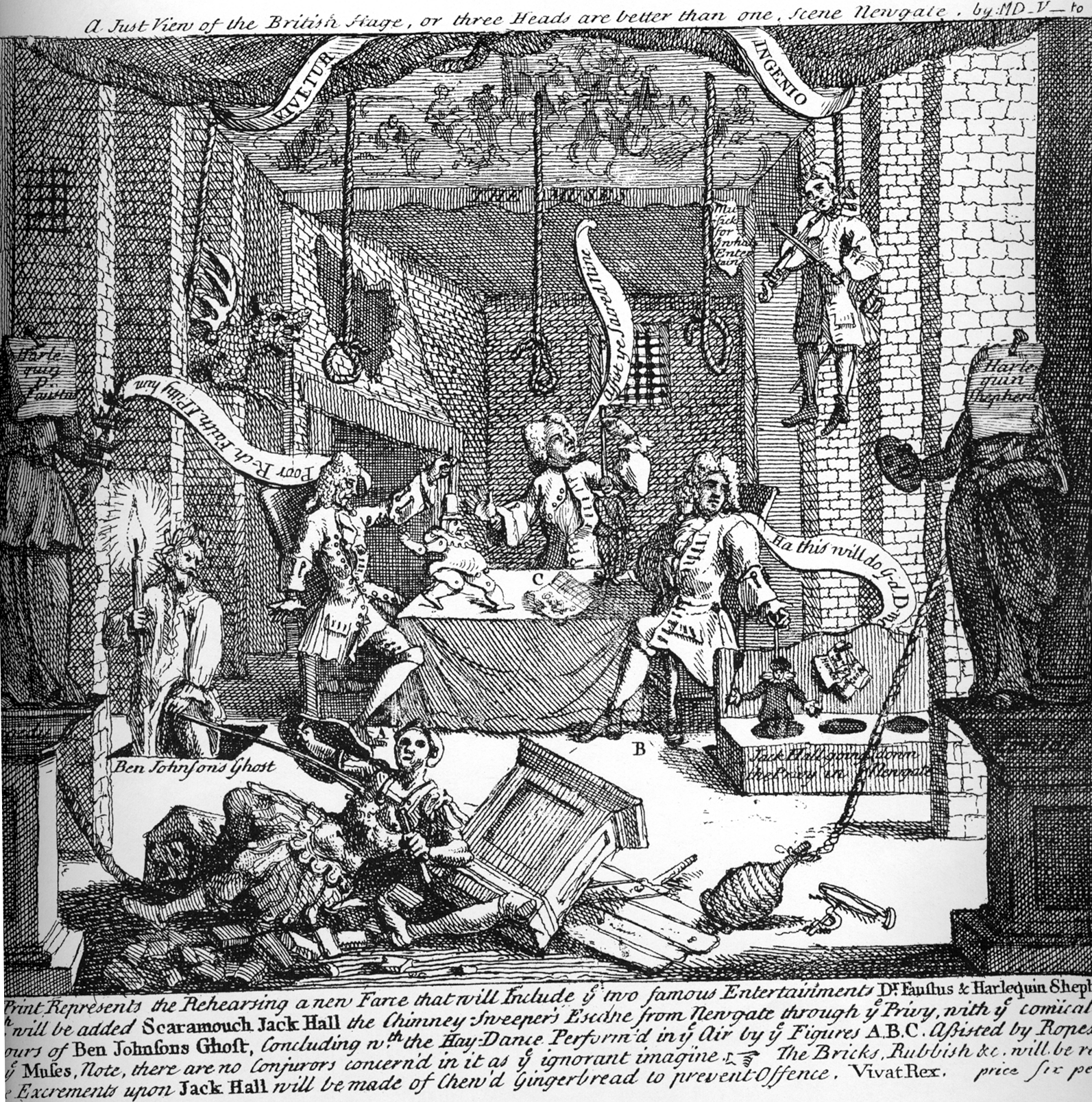
William Hogarth made this engraving entitled "A Just View of the English Stage" in 1727. It shows the managers of the Drury Lane theatre (including Colley Cibber (center)) concocting an absurd farce with every possible stage effect, simply to get the better of John Rich. The toilet paper in the privy is labelled "Hamlet" and "Way of Ye World".

From critics, he turns to the contrastive of triumphant dunces and lost merit. Orator Henley gets special attention here (lines 195 ff.). Henley had set himself up as a professional lecturer. On Sundays, he would discuss theology, and on Wednesdays any other subject, and those who went to hear him would pay a shilling each ("Oh great Restorer of the good old Stage, / Preacher at once, and Zany of thy Age!" III 201–202), while learned bishops and skilled preachers spoke to empty congregations. Next come the theatres: a Dr. Faustus was the toast of the 1726–1727 season, with both Lincoln's Inn Fields and Drury Lane competing for more and more lavish stage effects to get the audiences in:

Gods, imps, and monsters, music, rage, and mirth,
A fire, a jig, a battle, and a ball,
Till one wide Conflagration swallows all. (III 234–236)

Even though Pope was on good terms with some of the men involved (e.g. Henry Carey, who provided music for the Drury Lane version), the two companies are fighting to see who can make the least sense. This competition of vulgarity is led by two theatres, and each has its champion of decadence. At Lincoln's Inn Fields is the "Angel of Dulness", John Rich:

Immortal Rich! how calm he sits at ease
Mid snows of paper, and fierce hail of pease;
And proud his mistress' orders to perform,
Rides in the whirlwind, and directs the storm. (III 257–260)

Rich's ability to ride in a stage whirlwind (in parody of God in the Book of Job) is matched by Colley Cibber and Barton Booth, patentees of the Drury Lane theatre, who mount the stage in purple dragons and have an aerial battle. Dulness is the winner in these contests, for she benefits. Settle urges Theobald to refine these entertainments, to hammer them home and get them all the way to court, so that Dulness can be the true empress of the land. He prophesies that Theobald will live in an age that will see Laurence Eusden the Poet Laureate and Colley Cibber the "Lord Chancellor of plays".

Settle then reveals some current triumphs of dullness over good sense. He mentions William Benson as the proper judge of architecture:

While Wren with sorrow to the grave descends,
Gay dies un-pension'd with a hundred Friends,
Hibernian Politicks, O Swift, thy doom,
And Pope's translating three whole years with Broome. (III 325–328)

William Benson was a fool who had taken the place of Sir Christopher Wren and told the House of Lords that the house was unsound and falling down. It was not. John Gay never obtained a pension and yet was often remarked as one of the most jovial, intelligent, and compassionate wits of the age. Jonathan Swift had been "exiled" to Ireland, where he had become involved in Irish politics. Pope himself had spent three years translating Homer. Settle sees in these things great prospects for the coming age of darkness.

The poem ends with a vision of the apocalypse of nonsense:

Lo! the great Anarch's ancient reign restor'd,
Light dies before her uncreating word: (III 339–340)

Settle invokes the second coming of stupidity, urging,

Thy hand great Dulness! lets the curtain fall,
And universal Darkness covers all. (III 355–356)

At the very conclusion, Theobald cannot take any more joy, and he wakes. The vision goes back through the ivory gate of Morpheus.

=== Themes of The Dunciad A ===
The Three Book Dunciad has an extensive inversion of Virgil's Aeneid, but it also structures itself heavily around a Christological theme. To some degree, this imagery of unholy consecration had been present in Dryden's MacFlecknoe, but Pope's King of Dunces is much more menacing than Thomas Shadwell could ever have been in Dryden's poem. It is not a case of an unworthy man getting praised that spurs the poem, but rather a force of degradation and decadence that motivates it. Pope is not targeting one man, but rather a social decline that he feels is all but irrevocable. Nevertheless, the poem is still a satire and not a lamentation. The top of society (the kings) may be dulled by spectacle and freak shows, but Dulness is only one force. She is at war with the men of wit, and she can be opposed. In the Four Book Dunciad (or Dunciad B), any hope of redemption or reversal is gone, and the poem is even more nihilistic.

== The four-book Dunciad B of 1743 ==
In 1741, Pope wrote a fourth book of the Dunciad and had it published the next year as a stand-alone text. He also began revising the whole poem to create a new, integrated, and darker version of the text. The four-book Dunciad appeared in 1743 as a new work. Most of the critical and pseudo-critical apparatus was repeated from the Dunciad Variorum of 1738, but there was a new "Advertisement to the Reader" by Bishop Warburton and one new substantial piece: a schematic of anti-heroes, written by Pope in his own voice, entitled Hyper-Critics of Ricardus Aristarchus. The most obvious change from the three-book to the four-book Dunciad was the change of hero from Lewis Theobald to Colley Cibber.

=== Colley Cibber: King of Dunces ===
Pope's choice of new 'hero' for the revised Dunciad, Colley Cibber, the pioneer of sentimental drama and celebrated comic actor, was the outcome of a long public squabble that originated in 1717, when Cibber introduced jokes onstage at the expense of a poorly received farce, Three Hours After Marriage, written by Pope with John Arbuthnot and John Gay. Pope was in the audience and naturally infuriated, as was Gay, who got into a physical fight with Cibber on a subsequent visit to the theatre. Pope published a pamphlet satirising Cibber, and continued his literary assault until his death, the situation escalating following Cibber's politically motivated appointment to the post of poet laureate in 1730. Cibber's role in the feud is notable for his 'polite' forbearance until, at the age of 71, he finally became exasperated. An anecdote in "A Letter from Mr. Cibber, to Mr. Pope", published in 1742, recounts their trip to a brothel organised by Pope's own patron, who apparently intended to stage a cruel joke at the expense of the poet. Since Pope was only about 4' tall, with a hunchback, due to a childhood tubercular infection of the spine, and the prostitute specially chosen as Pope's 'treat' was the fattest and largest on the premises, the tone of the event is fairly self-apparent. Cibber describes his 'heroic' role in snatching Pope off of the prostitute's body, where he was precariously perched like a tom-tit, while Pope's patron looked on, sniggering, thereby saving English poetry. In the third book of the first version of Dunciad (1728), Pope had referred contemptuously to Cibber's "past, vamp'd, future, old, reviv'd, new" plays, produced with "less human genius than God gives an ape". While Cibber's elevation to laureateship in 1730 had further inflamed Pope against him, there is little speculation involved in suggesting that Cibber's anecdote, with particular reference to Pope's "little-tiny manhood", motivated the revision of hero. Pope's own explanation of the change of hero, given in the guise of Ricardus Aristarchus, provides a detailed justification for why Colley Cibber should be the perfect hero for a mock-heroic parody.

Aristarchus's "hyper-criticism" establishes a science for the mock heroic and follows up some of the ideas set forth by Pope in Peri Bathous in the Miscellanies, Volume the Third (1727). In this piece, the rules of heroic poetry could be inverted for the proper mock-heroic. The epic hero, Pope says, has wisdom, courage, and love. Therefore, the mock-hero should have "Vanity, Impudence, and Debauchery". As a wise man knows without being told, Pope says, so the vain man listens to no opinion but his own, and Pope quotes Cibber as saying, "Let the world ... impute to me what Folly or weakness they please; but till Wisdom can give me something that will make me more heartily happy, I am content to be gazed at". Courage becomes a hero, Pope says, and nothing is more perversely brave that summoning all one's courage just to the face, and he quotes Cibber's claim in the Apology that his face was almost the best known in England. Chivalric love is the mark of a hero, and Pope says that this is something easy for the young to have. A mock-hero could keep his lust going when old, could claim, as Cibber does, "a man has his Whore" at the age of 80. When the three qualities of wisdom, courage, and love are combined in an epic hero, the result is, according to Pope, magnanimity that induces admiration in the reader. On the other hand, when vanity, impudence, and debauchery are combined in the "lesser epic" hero (Pope uses the term "lesser epic" to refer to the satirical epic that would function like a satire play in the Classical theatre), the result is "Buffoonry" that induces laughter and disgust. Finally, Pope says that Cibber's offences are compounded by the outlandishness of his claims. Although he was "a person never a hero even on the Stage", he sets himself out as an admirable and imitable person who expects applause for his vices.

=== The argument of the four-book Dunciad ===
Most of the argument of the Dunciad B is the same as that of Dunciad A: it begins with the same Lord Mayor's Day, goes to Dulness contemplating her realm, moves to Cibber (called "Bays", in honour of his being Poet Laureate and thereby having the laurel wreath and butt of sherry) in despair, announces Cibber's choice as new King of Dunces, etc. Other than a change of hero, however, Pope made numerous adaptations and expansions of key passages. Not only are the topical references altered to fit Cibber's career, but Pope consistently changes the nature of the satire subtly by increasing the overarching metaphor of Cibber as "Anti-Christ of Wit", rather than Classical hero of Dulness. Most of the adaptations increase the parody of the Bible at the expense of the parody of Virgil.

==== B Book I ====
The invocation changes from "the one who brings" the Smithfield muses to the ears of kings to "The Mighty Mother, and her Son who brings", thus immediately making Cibber the fatherless son of a goddess, and the poem addresses "... how the Goddess bade Britannia sleep, / And pour'd her Spirit o'er the land and deep" (I 7–8). From the invocation, the poem moves to an expanded description of the Cave of Poverty and Poetry, near Bedlam. Cibber is the co-master of the cave, "Where o'er the gates [of Bedlam], by his fam'd father's hand/ Great Cibber's brazen, brainless brothers stand" (I 31–32) (referring to statues constructed by Caius Cibber, Colley Cibber's father), and the cave is now the source of "Journals, Medleys, Merc'ries, Magazines" (I 42). These changes introduce the Biblical and apocalyptical themes that Book IV, in particular, will explore, as Dulness's spirit parodies the Holy Spirit dwelling upon the face of the waters in the Book of Genesis.

When Dulness chooses her new king, she settles on Bays, who is seen in his study surveying his own works:

Nonsense precipitate, like running Lead,
That slip'd thro' Cracks and Zig-zags of the Head;
...
Next, o'er his Books his eyes began to roll,
In pleasing memory of all he stole, (B I 123–124, 127–128)

The base of Cibber's pile of sacrificed books is several commonplace books, which are the basis of all his own productions. Although Cibber confesses:

Some Dæmon stole my pen (forgive th' offense)
And once betray'd me into common sense:
Else all my Prose and Verse were much the same;
This, prose on stilts; that, poetry fall'n lame (I 187–190)

The accidental common sense was The Careless Husband. When Cibber casts about for new professions, he, unlike Theobald in 1732, decides, "Hold—to the Minister I more incline; / To serve his cause, O Queen! is serving thine" (I 213–214). The "minister" is Robert Walpole, an extremely unpopular Whig leader, and the "queen" is both Dulness and Queen Caroline of Hanover, who was a Tory enemy for her reconciliation of George II with Walpole. When the new king is about to burn his books in despair, Pope heightens the religious imagery, for Cibber says to his books, "Unstain'd, untouch'd, and yet in maiden sheets;/ While all your smutty sisters walk the streets" (I 229–230), and it is better that they be burned than that they be wrapped in "Oranges, to pelt your sire" (I 236). Again, Dulness extinguishes the pyre with a sheet of the ever-wet Thule.

Cibber goes to Dulness's palace, and Pope says that he feels at home there, and "So Spirits ending their terrestrial race, / Ascend, and recognize their Native Place" (I 267–268). The Christian Heaven-home of Puritan songs is altered for Cibber to the originating sleep of Dulness. While in the Dunciad A the palace had been empty, it is here crowded with ghosts (the same dunces mentioned in 1727, but all having died in the interim). Dulness calls forth her servants to herald the new king, and the book ends with Dulness's prayer, which takes an apocalyptic tone in the new version:

O! when shall rise a Monarch all our own,
And I, a Nursing-mother, rock the throne,
'Twixt Prince and People close the Curtain draw,
...
And suckle Armies, and dry-nurse the land:
'Till Senates nod to Lullabies divine,
And all be sleep, as at an Ode of thine. (Dunciad B I 311–313, 316-318)

==== B Book II ====
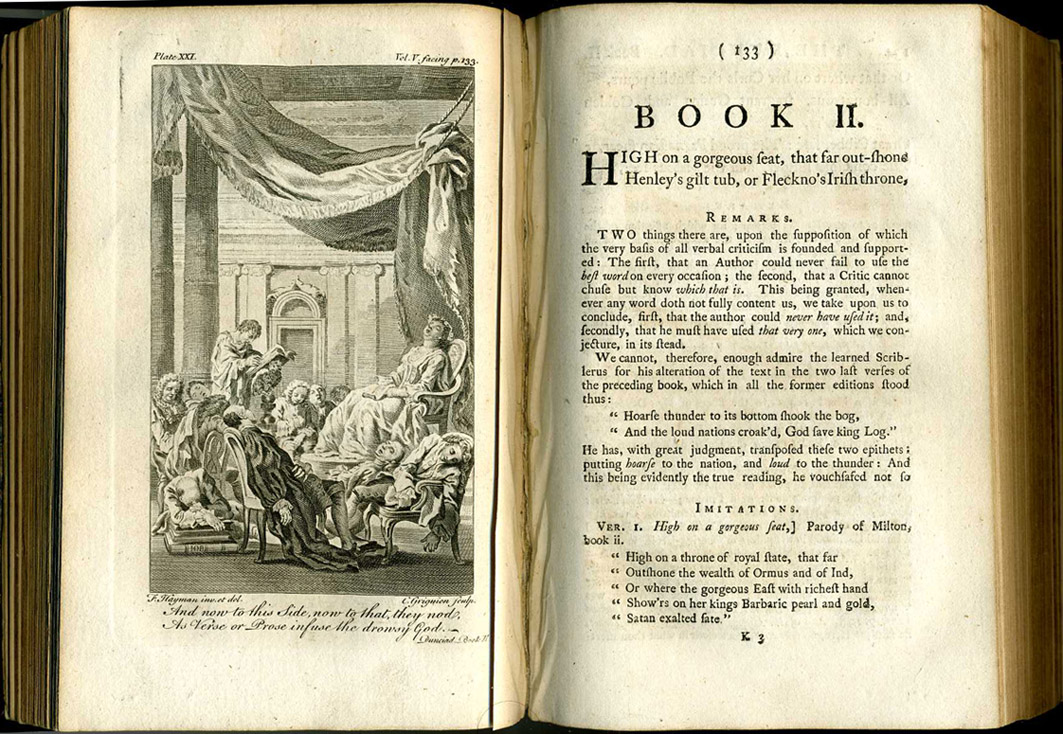
Frontispiece Book II of 1760 London edition of Pope's works (Vol V), showing the Goddess surrounded by sleeping poets.

Most of Book II of the Dunciad B is the same as Dunciad A. The Dunce Games are largely the same, with a few changes in personnel. Cibber watches all, with "A brain of feathers, and a heart of lead" (II 44). The contest of booksellers is generally as it was in 1727, with Curll slipping on bedpan slops. However, when Curll prays to Cloacina, Pope provides more motivation for her hearing his prayer:

Oft had the Goddess heard her servant's call,
From her black grottos near the Temple-wall,
List'ning delighted to the jest unclean
Of link-boys vile, and watermen obscene. (B II 97–100)

Further, Cloacina aids Curll win the race herself, and not by intercession with Jove, and Pope here explains how she propels him to victory: she makes the ordure nourishment to Curll, and he "Imbibes new life, and scours and stinks along" (B II 106). Again, the phantom poet, More, vanishes. The game for Eliza Heywood's person and poetry is the same as the previous version, except that the promised gift for the runner-up is a chamber pot. Curll here competes with Thomas Osborne, a bookseller who had claimed to sell Pope's subscription edition of Iliad at half price, when he had merely pirated it, cut the size of the book to octavo, and printed on low quality paper. Curll wins Eliza, and Osborne is crowned with the pot.

The "tickling" contest is the same, except that Thomas Bentley, nephew of Richard Bentley the classicist, replaces Richard Blackmore. This Bentley had written a fawning ode on the son of Robert Harley (a former friend of Pope's with whom he seems estranged). In the noise battle, Dulness tells her poets,

With Shakespear's nature, or with Johnson's art,
Let others aim: 'Tis yours to shake the soul
With Thunder rumbling from the mustard bowl, (B II 224–226)

In the braying contest that follows, there is a noise that seems to come "from the deep Divine; / There Webster! peal'd thy voice, and Whitfield! thine" (B II 257–258). Webster was a radical Protestant religious writer who had demanded the scourging of the church, and Whitfield was George Whitfield, the notable collaborator with John Wesley, who agreed with Webster only "to abuse all the sober Clergy". Richard Blackmore appears again as the single singer with the loudest "bray".

The progress by Bridewell to Fleet-ditch and the muck-diving games are the same, but, again, with some changes of dunces. Oldmixon, who had appeared in 1727 as one of the ticklers, is here the elderly diver who replaces John Dennis. Smedley and Concanen are the same, but Pope adds a new section on party political papers:

Next plung'd a feeble, but a desp'rate pack,
With each a sickly brother at his back:
Sons of a Day! just buoyant on the flood,
Then number'd with the puppies in the mud.
Ask ye their names? I could as soon disclose
The names of these blind puppies as of those. (B 305–310)

These "sons of a day" are the daily newspapers that only had lifespans of a single issue. They were frequently printed with two different papers on the same sheet of paper (front and back), and Pope quotes the investigation into Robert Harley, 1st Earl of Oxford (conducted by Walpole's administration) as showing that the Tory ministry of Pope's friends had spent over fifty thousand pounds to support political papers. The dead gazettes are mourned only by "Mother Osborne" (James Pitt, who had run the London Journal under the name of "Father Osborne"; he had been called "Mother Osborne" for his dull, pedantic style). The champion of splattering in Dunciad B is William Arnal, a party author of the British Journal who had gotten ten thousand pounds as a political hack. In keeping with the insertion of Webster and Whitfield, earlier, Pope takes a new turn and has the winner of the depth dive be the Archbishop of Canterbury, John Potter (1674–1747), and he is surrounded by an army of minor authors, "Prompt or to guard or stab, to saint or damn, / Heav'n's Swiss, who fight for any God, or Man" (B II 357–358). These trimming religious authors are people like Benjamin Hoadley (who had been an aid to Smedley) and John "Orator" Henley. Potter describes the vision of Hades and the Styx pouring into the Thames, but it is not merely Lethe that pours in. Lethe and the effluvia of dreams go into the Thames, so the effect is that it "Intoxicates the pert, and lulls the grave" (B II 344). The Archbishop of Canterbury becomes the Archbishop of Dulness.

The book concludes with the contest of reading Blackmore and Henley.

==== B Book III ====
Book III is, like Book II, largely the same text as the Dunciad Variorum. In light of the new fourth book and the subtle changes of Book I, however, some passages take on more menace. The opening, in which Cibber rests with his head in Dulness's lap, is here a clear parody of the Madonna with child. The vision granted Cibber is less Christological, as Cibber is not given a mission in the same way with an infusion of the Unholy Spirit, as Book IV provides a new ending, but the general vision of Hades is the same. Cibber visits the shade of Elkannah Settle and is shown the translatio studii and its inverse, the translatio stultitiae, as learning moves ever westward across the world, with the sun, and darkness springs up right behind it.

In the survey of the formless poets waiting to be born (in print), Cibber sees the same faces as Theobald had, but with a few excisions and additions. The implied homosexual couple of critics from the Dunciad A are cut, but a mass of nameless poets contend, "who foremost shall be dam'd to Fame" (B III 158) (both cursed with fame and damned by the goddess Fama for being an idiot), and altogether,

Down, down they larum, with impetuous whirl,
The Pindars, and the Miltons of a Curl. (B III 163–164)

As in the previous version, these struggling hack writers and political character assassins are contrasted to the glorious dunces who win all the money and fame of the kingdom, while worthy ministers and divines go ignored. Thus, Settle features Orator Henley as a paragon,

... his breeches rent below;
Imbrown'd with native bronze, lo! Henley stands,
Tuning his voice, and balancing his hands. (B III 198–200)

As in the three book Dunciad, Settle shows the happy triumph of Dulness on the stage, but the lines are compressed and take on a new parodic context:

All sudden, Gorgons hiss, and Dragons glare,
And ten-horn'd fiends and Giants rush to war.
Hell rises, Heav'n descends, and dance on Earth:
Gods, imps, and monsters, music, rage, and mirth,
A fire, a jigg, a battle, and a ball,
'Till one wide conflagration swallows all.
Thence a new world to Nature's laws unknown,
Breaks out refulgent, with a heav'n its own: (B III 235–242)

The theatre is providing a mockery of the Apocalypse and the second coming, an inverted, man-made spectacle of the divine. For these accomplishments, Settle blesses Cibber and mourns his own failure in Dulness's service. For Cibber,

Happier thy fortunes! like a rolling stone,
Thy giddy dulness still shall lumber on,
Safe in its heaviness, shall never stray,
But lick up ev'ry blockhead in the way. (B III 293–296)

Settle then takes a glance at the loss of learning incipient in the age. In architecture, the fool triumphant is Ripley, who was making a new Admiralty building, while "Jones' and Boyle's" fail. Settle wishes for the day to come soon when Eton and Westminster are in permanent holiday. As with the earlier version of the poem, the book ends with Cibber excitedly waking from his dream.

==== Book IV ====
Book IV was entirely new to the Dunciad B and had been published first as a stand-alone concluding poem. Pope himself referred to the four-book version "the Greater Dunciad", in keeping with the Greater Iliad. It is also "greater" in that its subject is larger. Book IV can function as a separate piece or as the conclusion of the Dunciad: in many ways its structure and tone are substantially different from the first three books, and it is much more allegorical.

It opens with a second, nihilistic invocation:

Yet, yet a moment, one dim Ray of Light
Indulge, dread Chaos, and eternal Night!
...
Suspend a while your Force inertly strong,
Then take at once the Poet, and the Song. (B IV 1–2, 7–8)

The fourth book promises to show the obliteration of sense from England. The Dog-star shines, the lunatic prophets speak, and the daughter of Chaos and Nox (Dulness) rises to "dull and venal a new World to mold" (B IV 15) and begin a Saturnian age of lead.

Dulness takes her throne, and Pope describes the allegorical tableau of her throne room. Science is chained beneath her foot-stool. Logic is gagged and bound. Wit has been exiled from her kingdom entirely. Rhetoric is stripped on the ground and tied by sophism. Morality is dressed in a gown that is bound by two cords, of furs (the ermines of judges) and lawn (the fabric of bishops sleeves), and at a nod from Dulness, her "page" (a notorious hanging judge named Page who had had over one hundred people executed) pulls both cords tight and strangles her. The Muses are bound in tenfold chains and guarded by Flattery and Envy. Only mathematics is free, because it is too insane to be bound. Nor, Pope says, could Chesterfield refrain from weeping upon seeing the sight (for Chesterfield had opposed the Licensing Act 1737, which is the chaining of the Muses). Colley Cibber, however, slumbers, his head in Dulness's lap. (In a note, Pope says that it is proper for Cibber to sleep through the whole of Book IV, as he had had no part in the actions of book II, slept through book III, and therefore ought to go on sleeping.)

Into the audience chamber, a "Harlot form" "with mincing step, small voice, and languid eye" comes in (B IV 45–46). This is opera, who wears patchwork clothing (for operas being made up of the patchwork of extant plays and being itself a mixed form of singing and acting). Opera then speaks to Dulness of the Muses:

Chromatic tortures soon shall drive them hence,
Break all their nerves, and fritter all their sense:
One Trill shall harmonize joy, grief, and rage,
Wake the dull Church, and lull the ranting Stage;
To the same notes thy sons shall hum, or snore,
And all thy yawning daughters cry, encore. (B IV 55–60)

However, Opera warns Dulness that Handel is a threat to her. His operas make too much sense, have too strong a plot, and are too masculine in their performance. Accordingly, Dulness banishes Handel to Ireland.

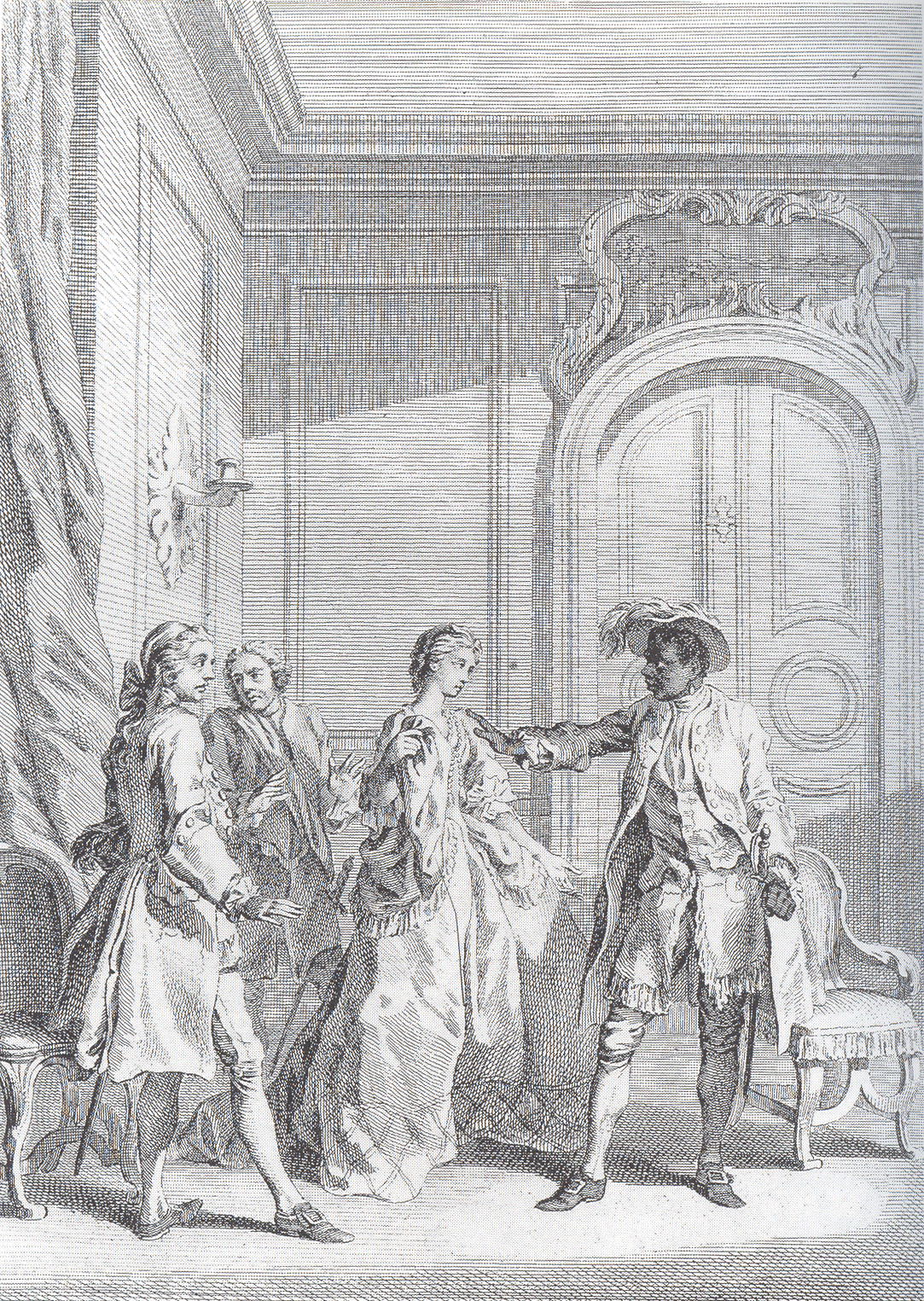
An illustration of Othello striking Desdemona from Thomas Hanmer's ornate 1743 edition of William Shakespeare. The text was based on Pope's edition.

Fame blows her "posterior trumpet", and all the dunces of the land come to Dulness's throne. There are three classes of dunce. First, there are the naturally dull. These are drawn to her as bees are to a queen bee, and they "adhere" to her person. The second are the people who do not wish to be dunces but are, "Whate'er of mungril no one class admits, / A wit with dunces, and a dunce with wits" (B IV 89–90). These dunces orbit Dulness. They struggle to break free, and they get some distance from her, but they are too weak to flee. The third class are "false to Phoebus, bow to Baal; / Or impious, preach his Word without a call" (B IV 93–94). They are men and women who do dull things by supporting dunces, either by giving money to hacks or by suppressing the cause of worthy writers. These people come to Dulness as a comet does: although they are only occasionally near her, they habitually do her bidding. Of this last group, Pope classes Sir Thomas Hanmer, a "decent knight", who absurdly thinks himself a great Shakespeare editor and uses his own money to publish an exceptionally lavish and ornate edition (with a text that was based on Pope's own edition). He is outshone in darkness by one Benson, who is even more absurd, in that he begins putting up monuments of John Milton, striking coins and medals of Milton, and translating Milton's Latin poetry and who had then passed from excessive Milton fanaticism to fanaticism for Arthur Johnston, a Scottish physician and Latin poet. Unable to be the most fantastically vain man, Hamner prepares to withdraw his edition, but "Apollo's May'r and Aldermen" (B IV 116) take the page from him. (This was a reference to Oxford University Press, with which Pope had a quarrel based on their denying Bishop Warburton a doctorate in 1741). Dulness tells her followers to imitate Benson and tack their own names to statues and editions of famous authors, to treat standard authors as trophies (the busts made of them like hunting trophies), and thus "So by each Bard an Alderman shall sit" (B IV 131).

All of the dunces press forward, vying to be the first to speak, but a ghost comes forward who awes them all and makes all to shake in fear. Doctor Busby, headmaster of Westminster School appears, "Dropping with Infant's blood, and Mother's tears" (B IV 142) from the birch cane that he used to whip boys, and every man in the hall begins to tremble. Busby tells Dulness that he is her true champion, for he turns geniuses to fools, "Whate'er the talents, or howe'er design'd, / We hang one jingling padlock on the mind" (B IV 161–162). Dulness agrees and wishes for a pedant king like James I again, who will "stick the Doctor's Chair into the Throne" (B IV 177), for only a pedant king would insist on what her priests (and only hers) proclaim: "The Right Divine of Kings to govern wrong" (B IV 188), for Cambridge and Oxford still uphold the doctrine.

As soon as she mentions them, the professors of Cambridge and Oxford (except for Christ Church college) rush to her, "Each fierce Logician, still expelling Locke" (B IV 196). (John Locke had been censured by Oxford University in 1703, and his Essay on Human Understanding had been banned.) These professors give way to their greatest figure, Richard Bentley, who appears with his Quaker hat on and refuses to bow to Dulness. Bentley tells Dulness that he and critics like him are her true champions, for he had "made Horace dull, and humbled Milton's strains" (B IV 212) and, no matter what her enemies do, critics will always serve Dulness, for "Turn what they will to Verse, their toil is vain,/ Critics like me shall make it Prose again" (B IV 213–214). Picking fine arguments on letters and single textual variants and correcting authors, he will make all wits useless, and clerics, he says, are the purely dull, though the works of Isaac Barrow and Francis Atterbury might argue otherwise. He says that it is "For thee explain a thing till all men doubt it,/ And write about it, Goddess, and about it" (B IV 251–252). They cement over all wit, throwing stone back onto the figures that authors had chiselled out of marble. As he makes his boast, he sees a whore, a pupil, and a French governor come forward, and the devout Bentley skulks away.

The French governor attempts to speak to Dulness but cannot be heard over the French horn sound that emerges, so the pupil tells his story. The "governor" is an English nobleman who went to school and college without learning anything, then went abroad on the Grand Tour, on which "Europe he saw, and Europe saw him too" (B IV 294). He went to Paris and Rome and "he saunter'd Europe round, / And gather'd ev'ry Vice on Christian ground" (B IV 311–312). At the end of his travels, he is "perfectly well-bred, / With nothing but a Solo in his head" (B IV 323–324), and he has returned to England with a despoiled nun following him. She is pregnant with his child (or the student's) and destined for the life of a prostitute (a kept woman), and the lord is going to run for Parliament so that he can avoid arrest. Dulness welcomes the three—the devious student, the brainless lord, and the spoiled nun—and spreads her own cloak about the girl, which "frees from sense of Shame".

After the vacuous traveller, an idle lord appears, yawning with the pain of sitting on an easy chair. He does nothing at all. Immediately after him, Annius speaks. He is the natural predator for idling nobles, for he is a forger of antiquities (named for Annio di Viterbo) who teaches the nobles to value their false Roman coins above their houses and their forged Virgil manuscripts above their own clothing. He serves Dulness by teaching her servants to vaunt their stupidity with their wealth.

== Bibliography ==
- Pope, Alexander (1729). The Dunciad. With Notes Variorum (1729). J. & P. Knapton. pp. 165–166.
- Pope, Alexander (1963). Butt, John (ed.). The Poems of Alexander Pope (a one-volume edition of the Twickenham text ed.). Yale University Press. ISBN 0300003404. OCLC 855720858.
- Pope, Alexander (1969). Williams, Aubrey (ed.). Poetry and Prose of Alexander Pope. New York: Houghton Mifflin.
- Mack, Maynard (1985). Alexander Pope: A Life. New York: W. W. Norton.
