= John Smedley =

John Smedley may refer to:

- Jonathan Smedley (1671–1729), Anglo-Irish churchman and satirical victim
- John Smedley (industrialist), 19th century English industrialist
- John Smedley (business executive), former president of Daybreak Game Company
- John Smedley (British Army officer)
- John Smedley (architect), Australian–born architect
