= Bavius =

Bavius and Maevius (or Mevius) were two poets in the age of Augustus, whose names became synonymous with bad verse and malicious criticism of superior writers. Both are named together in Virgil's Eclogues (3.90). Maevius is also the object of Horace's tenth Epode, which invites the gods to drown him as he embarks on a sea voyage. The name M(a)evius is attested of several historical individuals, but whether Virgil's Bavius and Maevius are real writers or literary inventions is unclear.

Alexander Pope mentions Bavius in his 1729 Dunciad Variorum and explains, in a note, that he drew the reference from Virgil. Pope draws a parallel between these two critics and his own dunces by quoting John Dennis who thought it likely that Bavius "and Maevius had (even in Augustus's days) a very formidable Party at Rome, who thought them much superior to Virgil and Horace: For (saith he) I cannot believe they would have fix'd that eternal brand upon them, if they had not been coxcombs in more than ordinary credit" (Dunciad Variorum). Bavius and Maevius are also like the "dunces" in Pope's own Dunciad in that little is remembered of them except for their bad reputations. In the Dunciad, Book III, Pope has Bavius dip the transmigrating souls of poetasters in Lethe, making them doubly stupid before being born as hack writers. In his "An Essay on Criticism," Pope writes of Maevius:

Some are bewilder'd in the Maze of Schools,
And some made Coxcombs Nature meant but Fools.
In search of Wit these lose their common Sense,
And then turn Criticks in their own Defence.
Each burns alike, who can, or cannot write,
Or with a Rival's or a Eunuch's spite.
All Fools have still an Itching to deride,
And fain wou'd be upon the Laughing Side;
If Maevius Scribble in Apollo's spight,
There are, who judge still worse than he can write...

Maevius also features in the Earl of Roscommon's "An Essay on Translated Verse" as a symbol of poetic failure:

"Whoever vainly on his strength depends,
Begins like Virgil, but like Maevius ends."
(in J.E. Spingarn, ed., Critical Essays of the Seventeenth Century, II, p.299)
