= Emma Smedley =

American dietitian

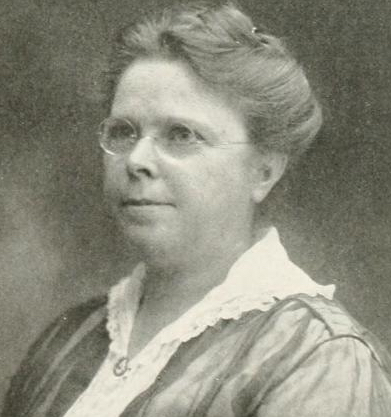
- Emma Smedley, from a 1919 publication
- Born: November 19, 1868; Media, Pennsylvania, U.S.
- Died: January 1, 1944 (aged 75); Media, Pennsylvania, U.S.
- Occupations: Dietitian, educator

Emma Smedley (November 19, 1868 – January 1, 1944) was an American home economist and dietitian. As the first director of Philadelphia's pioneering public school lunch program, she was known for her work on developing recipes and procedures for institutional food service.

== Early life and education ==
Smedley was from Media, Pennsylvania, the daughter of Thomas Smedley and Philena Yarnall Smedley. Her family were Quakers. She graduated from Westtown School in 1881, and taught there as a young woman.

== Career ==
Smedley taught domestic science at Drexel Institute, and was director of dietetics at the Johns Hopkins School of Nursing. In 1909 she became the first director of Philadelphia's public school lunch program. The program provided "good, substantial and nourishing food" to thousands of children every school day, and became a model for school districts nationwide. "Miss Smedley's blue eyes dance with enthusiasm and whole-souled interest in her work as she talks", noted a 1915 profile, which also described her as "one of the highest paid women holding office in the city". The program also served suppers to night-school students, mostly working teenagers. Typical offerings included milk, bread, soup, fruit, crackers, and a dessert such as cookies, ice cream or chocolate, with small servings sold for a penny.

During World War I, Smedley led the school kitchens in food conservation, personally overseeing the drying and canning of fruits and vegetables to extend their shelf life. "We find that properly prepared lunches save the state money, by keeping the children in better health and thus increasing their attendance at school," she explained in 1930. Her position as longterm sole supervisor of such a large program drew scrutiny; the Board of Education commissioned an investigation in 1931. Investigators found Smedley had acted ethically, but still recommended that the board take more responsibility for overseeing program priorities, planning, and expenditures. She lectured about her work, and trained school dietitians in other cities. She retired from the school district in 1932.

Smedley was treasurer of the American Dietetic Association during the presidency of Lulu Grace Graves. In 1934, she was elected president of the Pennsylvania Dietetic Association. She was also one of the founders of the American Home Economics Association.

== Publications ==
- Dietary Studies in Public Institutions in Philadelphia, Pa. (1910, with Robert Denniston Milner)
- "High School Lunches Under School Board Control" (1913)
- Institution Recipes for Use in Schools, Colleges, Hospitals, and Other Institutions (1912)
- The School Lunch: Its Organization and Management in Philadelphia (1920)
- Institution Recipes in Use at Johns Hopkins Hospital
- Institutional Recipes, Standardized in Large Quantities (1924)

== Personal life ==
Smedley died in 1944, at the age of 75, in Media.
