= Smedley, Virginia =

Unincorporated community in Virginia, US

Coordinates: 38°41′54″N 78°13′00″W

Smedley is an unincorporated community in Rappahannock County, in the U.S. state of Virginia.
