= Thomas Bentley (scholar) =

English classical scholar

Thomas Bentley by A Pond after Pier Leone Ghezzi

Thomas Bentley LLD (d. 1742), classical scholar, son of James Bentley (the eldest son of Thomas Bentley of Woodlesford, half-brother to Dr. Richard Bentley); "was brought up at St. Paul's School in London", and was afterwards entered of Trinity College, Cambridge, where he proceeded BA in 1711, and MA in 1715.

In 1713 he published a small Horace, which was, in fact, an annotated edition of his uncle's text, dedicated to Lord Harley. Pope, in an offensive note to the edition of 1736, referred to this dedication, and declared that a couplet in The Dunciad (ii. 205), which has always been understood to refer to the uncle, really applied to the nephew:

Bentley his mouth with classic flutt'ry opes,
And the puff'd orator bursts out in tropes.

In 1718, being then a fellow of his college, Thomas Bentley published his M. T. Ciceronis de Finibus Bonorum et Malorum Libri Quinque et Paradoxōn Liber Unus. Emendavit, Notisque illustravit Thomas Bentley, A.M., Trin. Coll. Camb. Socius, 8vo, Cambridge, 1718. As he declined or neglected to take orders, he lost his fellowship when he had become a master of arts of about seven years' standing, but was appointed librarian of Trinity, and proceeded to his LLD degree in 1724. In 1725-6 he was abroad on a literary excursion for the purpose of examining and collating manuscripts which might assist his uncle in the projected edition of the Greek New Testament, Bentley consulted manuscripts at Paris, Rome, Naples, and Florence, and took collation of the celebrated Vatican Manuscript, his notes on which were afterwards (1784) submitted to Woide for use in his valuable Novum Testamentum Graecum e Codice MS. Alexandrino, etc. fol., 1786. Dr. Thomas Bentley was not, as has been said, the salaried employé of his uncle, and both at Paris and at Rome he devoted most of his time to collating Greek manuscripts of Plutarch, with a view to the publication of an edition of that author, to which his health rendered him unequal. In 1741 Bentley published his handsome edition of the hymns of Callimachus, Callimachi Hymni et Eppigrammata; quibiis accesserunt Theognidis Carmina, etc., 8vo, London, 1741, which was for some time mistakenly ascribed to his uncle. His edition of Cæsar, with notes of his own and of his friend Dr. Jurin, appeared in 1742. He died suddenly, as Dr. Monk says on the authority of a communication from Mr. Bentley Warren, on 28 May 1742, at Clifton. In The Gentleman's Magazine for 1786, Thomas Bentley has been confounded with Richard Bentley, another nephew of the master, who was rector of Nailston from 1745 to 1786, BA 1725, MA 1729, DD 1750, and a literary executor of his famous uncle.
