= Whig government =

In British politics, a Whig government may refer to the following British governments administered by the Whigs:

- Whig Junto, a name given to a group of leading Whigs who were seen to direct the management of the Whig Party
  - First Whig Junto, the government dominated by six particular Whigs (1694–1699)
  - Godolphin–Marlborough ministry, the second Whig Junto government, dominated by Lord Godolphin and the Duke of Marlborough (1702–1710)
- Townshend ministry, the government dominated by Lord Townshend (1714–1717)
- First Stanhope–Sunderland ministry, the government dominated by Lord Stanhope and Lord Sunderland (1717–1718)
- Second Stanhope–Sunderland ministry, the government dominated by Lord Stanhope and Lord Sunderland (1718–1721)
- Walpole–Townshend ministry, the government dominated by Sir Robert Walpole and Lord Townshend (1721–1730)
- Walpole ministry, the government under Sir Robert Walpole (1730–1742)
- Carteret ministry, the government dominated by Lord Carteret (1742–1744)
- Broad Bottom ministry, the government under the Pelham brothers (1744–1754)
- First Newcastle ministry, the government under the Duke of Newcastle (1754–1756)
- Pitt–Devonshire ministry, the government dominated by William Pitt the Elder under the Duke of Devonshire (1756–1757)
- 1757 caretaker ministry, the government under the Duke of Devonshire
- Pitt–Newcastle ministry, the government dominated by William Pitt the Elder under the Duke of Newcastle (1757–1762)
- Grenville ministry, the government under George Grenville (1763–1765)
- First Rockingham ministry, the government under Lord Rockingham (1765–1766)
- Chatham ministry, the government under Lord Chatham, better known as Pitt the Elder (1766–1768)
- Grafton ministry, the government under the Duke of Grafton (1768–1770)
- North ministry, the government under Lord North (1770–1782)
- Second Rockingham ministry, the government under Lord Rockingham (1782)
- Shelburne ministry, the government under Lord Shelburne (1782–1783)
- Fox–North coalition, the government dominated by Charles James Fox and Lord North (1783)
- Canningite government, 1827–1828, the government under George Canning (Whig) and Lord Goderich (Tory) respectively
- Whig government, 1830–1834, the government under Lord Grey and Lord Melbourne respectively
- Second Melbourne ministry, the government under Lord Melbourne (1835–1841)
- First Russell ministry, the government under Lord John Russell (1846–1852)
- First Palmerston ministry, the government under Lord Palmerston (1855–1858)

== See also ==
- List of British governments
- Presidency of William Henry Harrison
- Presidency of John Tyler
- Presidency of Zachary Taylor
- Presidency of Millard Fillmore
- Whig history
