= Jonathan Smedley =

Jonathan Smedley (1671–1729) was an Anglo-Irish churchman who became Dean of Clogher in 1724. He was an opportunist and satirical victim who engaged in a polemic with Jonathan Swift and the forces of the Tory party.

== Life ==
He was born in Dublin, Ireland, received his MA from Trinity College in 1698 and served as a chaplain in the British Army before getting a parish in County Cork in 1709. Despite having that office, he spent as much time as he could in Dublin and away from his parish.

When Jonathan Swift was made dean of St. Patrick's Cathedral, Dublin, Smedley pinned derogatory verses on the cathedral door, denouncing Swift. At that point, the Tory party was still in power in England, but the Whig party was ascendant. In 1715, just after the first Jacobite rebellion, Smedley was chosen to preach in for the Protestants. His sermon was full of invective for the High church position, and he accused the high churchmen of weakening the Church of England for an overthrow by the Roman Catholic Church, which was always scheming to take control.

In 1718, he again attacked high churchmen with A Rational and Historical Account of the Principles which Gave Birth to the Late Rebellion. This prompted Swift to respond from the pulpit to a sermon preached by "that scoundrel Smedley." Smedley again accused the high church of being in the Pope's service, and he further sees the great hope of England with only the House of Hanover and the dissenters (i.e. the remnants of the Puritan movement and the churches arising from it). He was further spending as much time in London as he was able and lobbying to get further preferment in the church. He did this by publishing nine of his sermons in 1719, and in 1721, 1723, and 1730 he published collections of his verses (at each juncture a time when Smedley was seeking preferment).

Richard Steele became one of Smedley's champions. He argued that Smedley had suffered persecution for his Whig views before 1714 (and the death of Queen Anne) and his tirelessness in the righteous causes of Protestantism. Smedley was given the deanery of Killala in western Ireland. He may not have spent much time at his new cathedral, and he presented himself as often as possible to the public as an anti-Swift, as the real "Dean Jonathan." In 1724 he resigned the cathedral of Killala for the cathedral at Clogher, which put him in the thick of the political life of Dublin and gave him easy shipping for London. He apparently wished to exchange that cathedral for a position in England itself. He was Dean of Clogher from 1724 to 1727.

In 1728 Smedley was made one of the bad examples in Alexander Pope's The Dunciad. Pope has Smedley among the muck-divers in Book II of the poem, where Smedley dives into the sewage and filth of Fleet Ditch and, though presumed dead, reemerges some 34 lines later with a lengthy tale of his exploits beneath the mud. That year, Smedley attacked Swift again in Gulliveriana and also attempted to attack Pope. Swift replied with The Duke's Answer. During this time Smedley attempted to get subscriptions for a projected A Universal View of All the Eminent Writers on the Holy Scriptures, but this came to nought.

Smedley was unable or unwilling to live within his income, and he mortgaged part of his deanery in Clogher to Benjamin Hoadley, then a rising figure in the political side of the Church. In 1729, Smedley resigned Clogher for the position of chaplain to Fort Madras in the British East India Company. He died en route on 30 March 1729 and was buried at sea. It later emerged that he had even sold his position of chaplain for £500 to someone in Madras.

Pope left Smedley in a position of infamy in the Dunciad B, and Swift, with Thomas Sheridan, attacked Smedley after his death in The Intelligencer #20 with "Dean Smedley Gone to Seek His Fortune", where he says that the man was "of Dullness, Pride, Conceit, a medley."
