= Whigs (British political party) =

1678–1859 political party in the UK

- Leaders: Robert Walpole; William Pitt the Elder; George Grenville; Charles James Fox; Lord Grey; Lord Melbourne; Lord Russell; Lord Palmerston
- Founder: Anthony Ashley Cooper, 1st Earl of Shaftesbury
- Founded: 1678; 348 years ago
- Dissolved: 1859; 167 years ago
- Preceded by: Roundheads; Kirk Party
- Merged into: Liberal Party
- Ideology: Whiggism; Anti-Catholicism (initially); Factions: Liberalism (British); Classical liberalism; Conservative liberalism; Parliamentarism
- Political position: Centre to centre-left
- Religion: Protestantism (Note: Many Whigs were members of the established Church of England, but the party attracted much support from Dissenting Protestants)
- Colours: Buff Blue

The Whigs were a political party in the Parliaments of England, Scotland, Ireland, Great Britain and the United Kingdom. Between the 1680s and the 1850s, the Whigs contested power with their rivals, the Tories. The Whigs merged with the Peelites and Radicals in the 1850s to form the Liberal Party. Many former Whigs left the Liberal Party in 1886 over the issue of Irish Home Rule to form the Liberal Unionist Party, which merged into the Conservative Party in 1912.

The Whigs began as a political faction that opposed absolute monarchy and Catholic emancipation, supporting constitutional monarchism and parliamentary government, but also Protestant supremacy. Unlike the Tories, they supported tolerance for non-Anglican Protestants.

They played a central role in the Glorious Revolution of 1688 and were the standing enemies of the Roman Catholic Stuart kings and pretenders. The period known as the Whig Supremacy (1714–1760) was enabled by the Hanoverian succession of George I in 1714 and the failure of the Jacobite rising of 1715 by Tory rebels. The Whigs took full control of the government in 1715 and thoroughly purged the Tories from all major positions in government, the army, the Church of England, the legal profession, and local political offices. The first great leader of the Whigs was Robert Walpole, who maintained control of the government from 1721 to 1742, and whose protégé, Henry Pelham, led the government from 1743 to 1754. Great Britain was essentially a one-party state under the Whigs until King George III came to the throne in 1760 and allowed Tories to return to government; however, the Whig Party's hold on power remained strong for many years thereafter. Historians have called the period from roughly 1714 to 1783 the "long period of Whig oligarchy". During the American War of Independence, the Whigs were the party more sympathetic to American independence and the creation of a democracy in the United States.

By 1784, both the Whigs and Tories had become formal political parties, with Charles James Fox becoming the leader of a reorganized Whig Party arrayed against William Pitt the Younger's new Tories. The foundation of both parties depended more on the support of wealthy politicians than on popular votes. Although there were elections to the House of Commons, only a few men controlled most of the voters.

Both parties slowly evolved during the 18th century. In the beginning, the Whig Party generally tended to support the aristocratic families, the continued disenfranchisement of Catholics and toleration of nonconformist Protestants (dissenters such as the Presbyterians), while the Tories generally favoured the minor gentry and people who were (relatively speaking) smallholders; they also supported the legitimacy of a strongly established Church of England. The so-called High Tories preferred high church Anglicanism, or Anglo-Catholicism. Some, particularly adherents of the non-juring schism, openly or covertly supported the exiled House of Stuart's claim to the throne—a position known as Jacobitism. Later, the Whigs came to draw support from the emerging industrial reformists and the mercantile class while the Tories came to draw support from farmers, landowners, royalists, and those who favoured higher imperial military spending.

By the first half of the 19th century, the Whig manifesto (owing especially to the influence of Charles James Fox) had come to encompass the supremacy of parliament, the abolition of slavery, the expansion of the franchise (suffrage) and an acceleration of the move toward complete equal rights for Catholics (a reversal of the party's late-17th-century position, which had been militantly anti-Catholic).

== Name ==
The word Whig originated as a shortening of Whiggamore, a nickname for a Scottish Presbyterian, particularly a Covenanter. This word first appeared in the context of the Whiggamore Raid of 1648, in which thousands of Covenanters marched on Edinburgh in order to overthrow the Engagers, who sought to reinstate Charles I. Its further history is unclear. The Oxford English Dictionary regards it as a compound of whig, meaning "to drive briskly", and mare. Bishop Burnet offers a slightly different etymology, tracing the word to whiggam, a call supposedly used to urge on horses:

The south-west counties of Scotland have seldom corn enough to serve them round the year: and the northern parts producing more than they need, those in the west come in the summer to buy at Leith the stores that come from the north: and from a word Whiggam, used in driving their horses, all that drove were called the Whiggamors, and shorter the Whiggs. Now in that year [1648], after the news came down of Duke Hamilton's defeat, the Ministers animated their people to rise, and march to Edinburgh: and they came up marching on the head of their parishes, with an unheard-of fury, praying and preaching all the way as they came. The Marquis of Argile and his party came and headed them, they being about 6000. This was called the Whiggamor's inroad: and ever after that all that opposed the Court came in contempt to be called Whiggs: and from Scotland the word was brought into England, where it is now one of our unhappy terms of distinction.

The word entered English political discourse during the Exclusion Crisis of 1679–1681, which hinged on whether Charles II's brother, the Duke of York (a Roman Catholic), should be allowed to succeed him as king. York's supporters were nicknamed Tories because of their supposed resemblance to Irish bandits and rebels, while his opponents were nicknamed Whigs because of their supposed resemblance to Scottish religious fanatics. In spite of their derogatory origins, the two words eventually became neutral designations for the two major factions in British politics.

== Origins ==
=== The parliamentarian faction ===
The precursor to the Whigs was Denzil Holles' parliamentarian faction, which was characterised by its opposition to absolute monarchism.

=== Exclusion Crisis ===
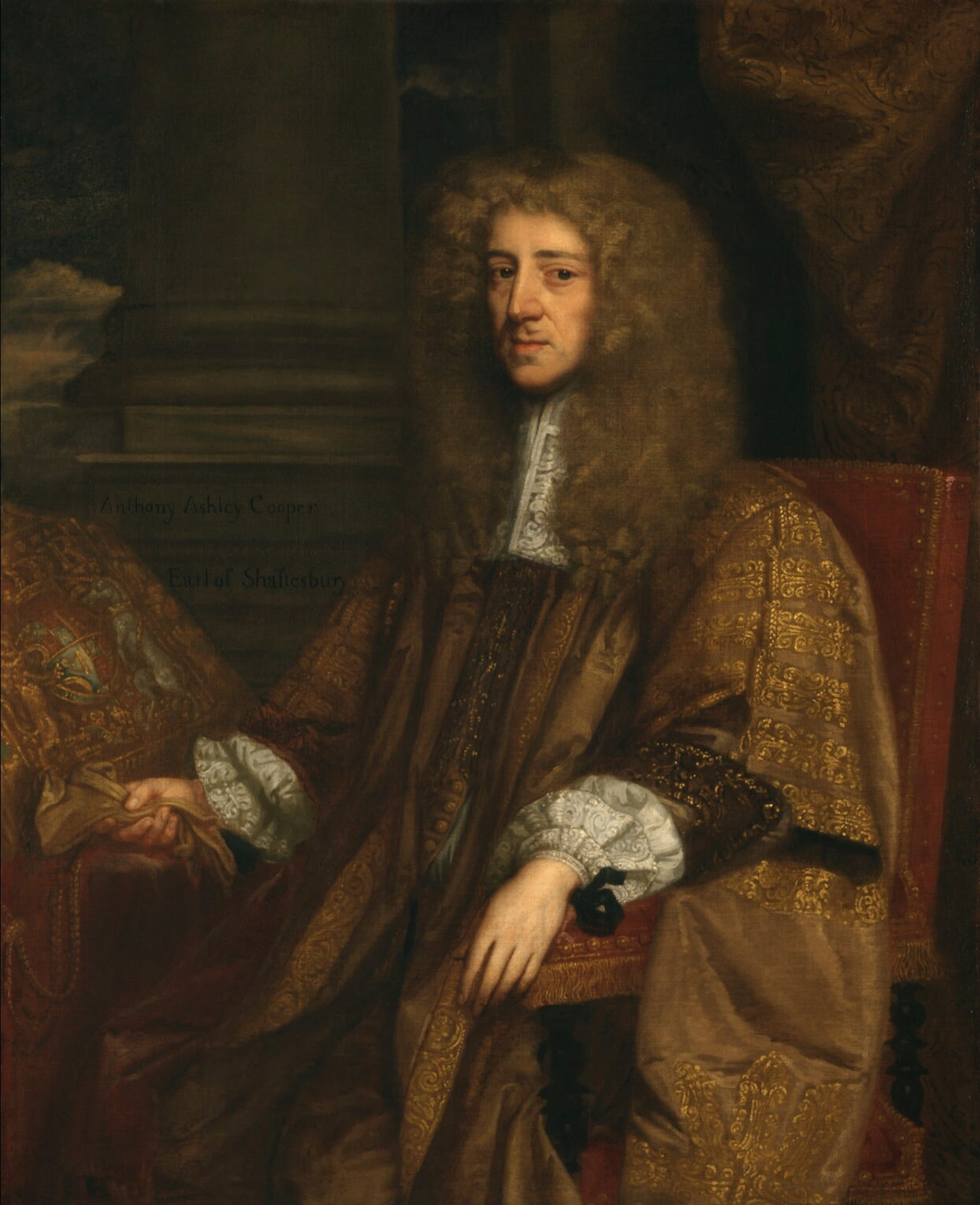
Anthony Ashley Cooper, 1st Earl of Shaftesbury, painted more than once during his chancellorship in 1672 by John Greenhill

Under Anthony Ashley Cooper, 1st Earl of Shaftesbury's leadership, the Whigs (also known as the Country Party) sought to exclude the Duke of York (who later became King James II) from the throne due to his Roman Catholicism, his favouring of monarchical absolutism, and his connections to France. They believed the heir presumptive, if allowed to inherit the throne, would endanger the Protestant religion, liberty and property.

The first Exclusion Bill was supported by a substantial majority on its second reading in May 1679. In response, King Charles II prorogued Parliament and then dissolved it; however, the subsequent elections in August and September saw the Whigs' strength increase. This new parliament did not meet for thirteen months, because Charles wanted to give passions a chance to die down. When it met in October 1680, an Exclusion Bill was introduced and passed in the Commons without major resistance, but was rejected in the Lords. Charles dissolved Parliament in January 1681, but the Whigs did not suffer serious losses in the ensuing election. The next Parliament first met in March at Oxford, but Charles dissolved it after only a few days, when he made an appeal to the country against the Whigs and determined to rule without Parliament. In February, Charles had made a deal with the French King Louis XIV, who promised to support him against the Whigs. Without Parliament, the Whigs gradually crumbled, mainly due to government repression following the discovery of the Rye House Plot. The Whig peers, the George Melville, 1st Earl of Melville, the David Leslie-Melville, Earl of Leven, and Lord Shaftesbury, and Charles II's illegitimate son the James Scott, 1st Duke of Monmouth, being implicated, fled to and regrouped in the United Provinces. Algernon Sidney, Thomas Armstrong and William Russell, Lord Russell, were executed for treason. The Earl of Essex committed suicide in the Tower of London over his arrest for treason, whilst Lord Grey of Werke escaped from the Tower.

=== Glorious Revolution ===
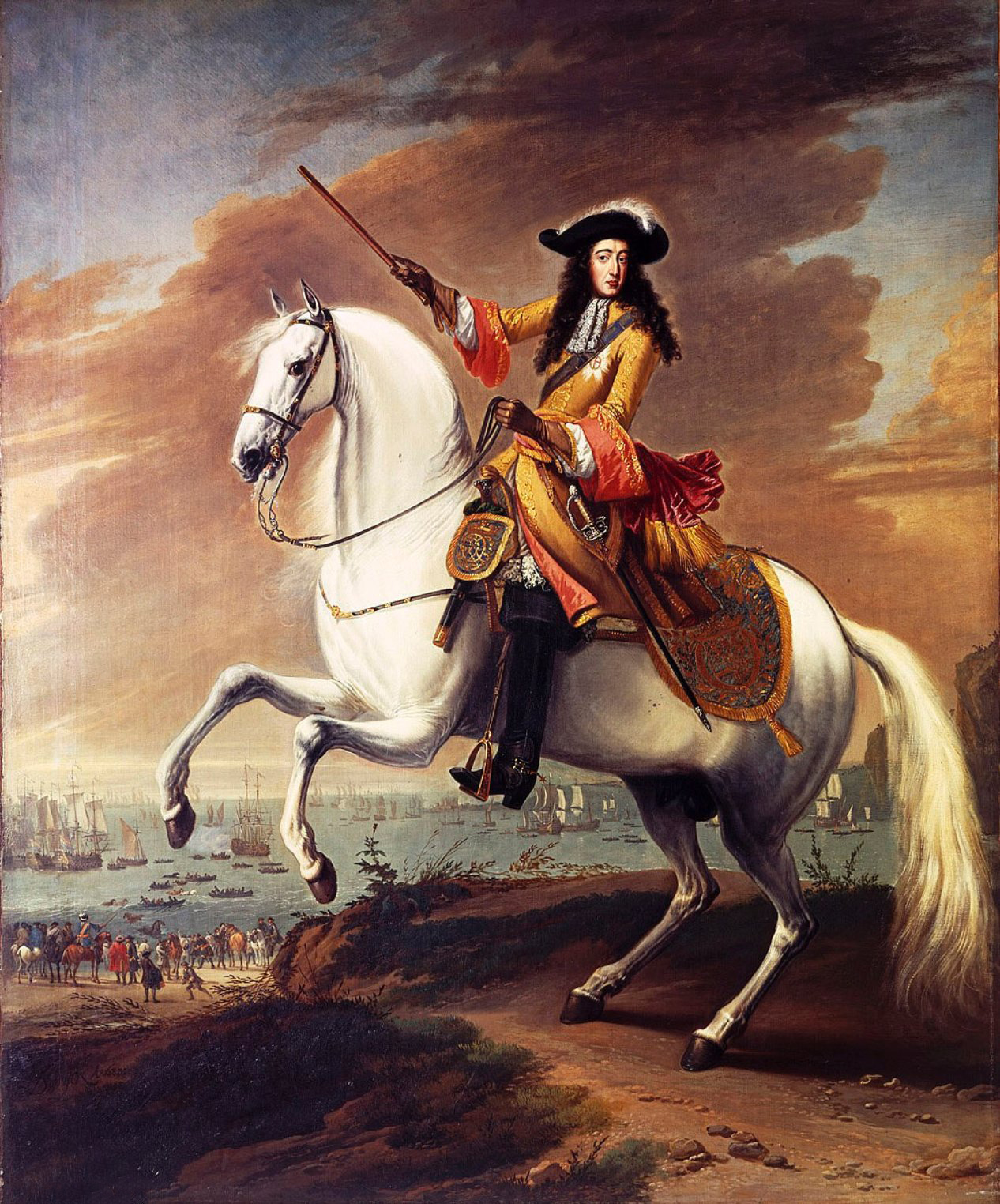
Equestrian portrait of William III by Jan Wyck, commemorating the landing at Brixham, Torbay, 5 November 1688

After the Glorious Revolution of 1688, Queen Mary II and King William III governed with both Whigs and Tories, despite the fact that many of the Tories still supported the deposed Roman Catholic James II. William saw that the Tories were generally friendlier to royal authority than the Whigs and he employed both groups in his government. His early ministry was largely Tory, but gradually the government came to be dominated by the so-called Junto Whigs, a group of younger Whig politicians who led a tightly organised political grouping. The increasing dominance of the Junto led to a split among the Whigs, with the so-called Country Whigs seeing the Junto as betraying their principles for office. The Country Whigs, led by Robert Harley, gradually merged with the Tory opposition in the later 1690s.

== History ==
=== 18th century ===
Although William's successor Anne had considerable Tory sympathies and excluded the Junto Whigs from power, after a brief and unsuccessful experiment with an exclusively Tory government she generally continued William's policy of balancing the parties, supported by her moderate Tory ministers, the Duke of Marlborough and Lord Godolphin. However, as the War of the Spanish Succession went on and became less and less popular with the Tories, Marlborough and Godolphin were forced to rely more and more on the Junto Whigs, so that by 1708 they headed an administration of the Parliament of Great Britain dominated by the Junto. Anne herself grew increasingly uncomfortable with this dependence on the Whigs, especially as her personal relationship with the Duchess of Marlborough deteriorated. This situation also became increasingly uncomfortable to many of the non-Junto Whigs, led by the Duke of Somerset and the Duke of Shrewsbury, who began to intrigue with Robert Harley's Tories. In the spring of 1710, Anne dismissed Godolphin and the Junto ministers, replacing them with Tories.

The Whigs now moved into opposition and particularly decried the 1713 Treaty of Utrecht, which they attempted to block through their majority in the House of Lords. The Tory administration led by Harley and the Viscount Bolingbroke persuaded the Queen to create twelve new Tory peers to force the treaty through.

==== Liberal ideals ====
The Whigs primarily advocated the supremacy of Parliament, while calling for toleration for Protestant dissenters. They adamantly opposed a Catholic as king. They opposed the Catholic Church because they saw it as a threat to liberty, or as Pitt the Elder stated: "The errors of Rome are rank idolatry, a subversion of all civil as well as religious liberty, and the utter disgrace of reason and of human nature".

Ashcraft and Goldsmith (1983) have traced in detail, in the period 1689 to 1710, the major influence of the liberal political ideas of John Locke on Whig political values, as expressed in widely cited manifestos such as "Political Aphorisms: or, the True Maxims of Government Displayed", an anonymous pamphlet that appeared in 1690 and was widely cited by Whigs. The 18th-century Whigs borrowed the concepts and language of universal rights employed by political theorists Locke and Algernon Sidney (1622–1682). By the 1770s the ideas of Adam Smith, a founder of classical liberalism became important. As Wilson and Reill (2004) note: "Adam Smith's theory melded nicely with the liberal political stance of the Whig Party and its middle-class constituents".

Samuel Johnson (1709–1784), a leading London intellectual, repeatedly denigrated the "vile" Whigs and praised the Tories, even during times of Whig political supremacy. In his great Dictionary (1755), Johnson defined a Tory as "one who adheres to the ancient Constitution of the state and the apostolical hierarchy of the Church of England, opposed to a Whig". He linked 18th-century Whiggism with 17th-century revolutionary Puritanism, arguing that the Whigs of his day were similarly inimical to the established order of church and state. Johnson recommended that strict uniformity in religious externals was the best antidote to the objectionable religious traits that he linked to Whiggism.

==== Protectionism ====
At their inception, the Whigs were protectionist in economic policy, with free trade policies being advocated by Tories. The Whigs were opposed to the pro-French policies of the Stuart kings Charles II and James II as they believed that such an alliance with the Catholic absolute monarchy of France endangered liberty and Protestantism. The Whigs claimed that trade with France was bad for England and developed an economic theory of overbalance, that is a deficit of trade with France was bad because it would enrich France at England's expense.

In 1678, the Whigs passed the Prohibition of 1678 that banned certain French goods from being imported into England. The economic historian William Ashley claimed that this Act witnessed the "real starting-point in the history of Whig policy in the matter of trade". It was repealed upon the accession of James II by a Tory-dominated House of Commons but upon the accession of William III in 1688 a new Act was passed that prohibited the importation of French goods. In 1704, the Whigs passed the Trade with France Act that renewed protectionism against France. In 1710, Queen Anne appointed the predominantly Tory Harley Ministry, which favoured free trade. When the Tory minister Lord Bolingbroke proposed a commercial treaty with France in 1713 that would have led to freer trade, the Whigs were vehemently against it and it had to be abandoned.

In 1786, Pitt's government negotiated the Eden Agreement, a commercial treaty with France which led to freer trade between the two countries. All of the Whig leaders attacked this on traditional Whig anti-French and protectionist grounds. Fox claimed that France was England's natural enemy and that it was only at Britain's expense that she could grow. Edmund Burke, Richard Sheridan, William Windham and Charles Grey all spoke out against the trade agreement on the same grounds.

Ashley claimed that "[t]he traditional policy of the Whig party from before the Revolution [of 1688] down to the time of Fox was an extreme form of Protectionism". The Whigs' protectionism of this period is today increasingly cited with approval by heterodox economists such as Ha-Joon Chang, who wish to challenge contemporary prevailing free trade orthodoxies via precedents from the past.

Later on, several members from the Whig party came to oppose the protectionism of the Corn Laws, but trade restrictions were not repealed even after the Whigs returned to power in the 1830s.

==== Whig Supremacy ====
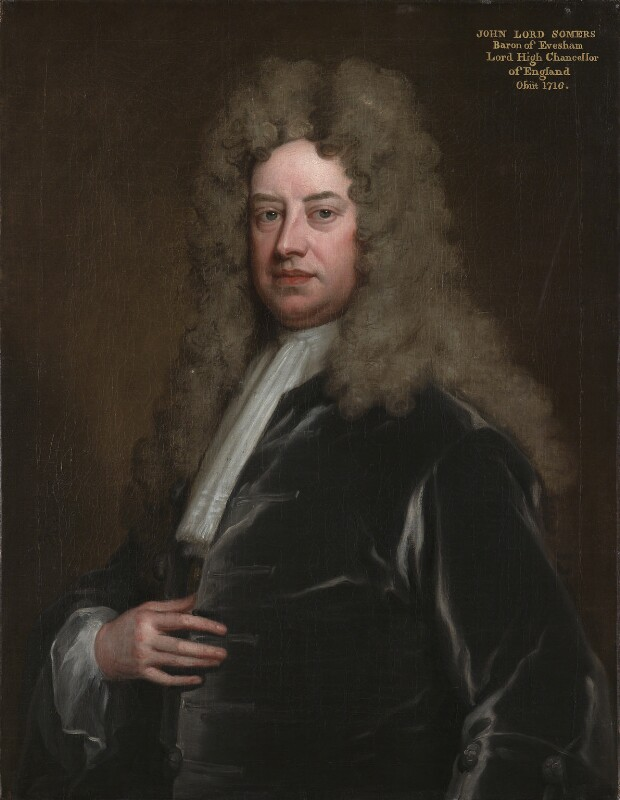
A c. 1705 portrait of John Somers, 1st Baron Somers by Godfrey Kneller

With the succession of Elector George Louis of Hanover as king in 1714, the Whigs returned to government with the support of some Hanoverian Tories. The Jacobite rising of 1715 discredited much of the Tory party as treasonous Jacobites, and the Septennial Act ensured that the Whigs became the dominant party, establishing the Whig oligarchy. Between 1717 and 1720 the Whig Split led to a division in the party. Government Whigs led by the former soldier James Stanhope were opposed by Robert Walpole and his allies. While Stanhope was backed by George I, Walpole and his supporters were closer to the Prince of Wales. Following his success in defeating the government over the Peerage Bill in 1719, Walpole was invited back into government the following year. He was able to defend the government in the Commons when the South Sea Bubble collapsed. When Stanhope died unexpectedly in 1721, Walpole replaced him as leader of the government and became known as the first Prime Minister. In the 1722 general election the Whigs swept to a decisive victory.

Between 1714 and 1760, the Tories struggled as an active political force, but always retained a considerable presence in the House of Commons. The governments of Walpole, Henry Pelham and his older brother the Duke of Newcastle dominated between 1721 and 1757 (with a brief break during the also-Whig Carteret ministry). The leading entities in these governments consistently referred to themselves as "Whigs".

==== George III's accession ====
This arrangement changed during the reign of George III, who hoped to restore his own power by freeing himself from the great Whig magnates. Thus George promoted his old tutor Lord Bute to power and broke with the old Whig leadership surrounding the Duke of Newcastle. After a decade of factional chaos, with distinct Bedfordite, Chathamite, Grenvillite and Rockinghamite factions successively in power and all referring to themselves as "Whigs", a new system emerged with two separate opposition groups. The Rockingham Whigs claimed the mantle of Old Whigs as the purported successors of the party of the Pelhams and the great Whig families. With such noted intellectuals as Edmund Burke behind them, the Rockingham Whigs laid out a philosophy which for the first time extolled the virtues of faction, or at least their faction. The other group were the followers of Lord Chatham, who as the great political hero of the Seven Years' War generally took a stance of opposition to party and faction.

Many Whigs came to oppose the government of Lord North, criticizing its handling of foreign policy and accusing it of being a Tory administration. While it largely consisted of individuals previously associated with the Whigs, many old Pelhamites as well as the Bedfordite Whig faction formerly led by the Duke of Bedford and elements of that which had been led by George Grenville, it also contained elements of the Kings' Men, the group formerly associated with Lord Bute and which was generally seen as Tory-leaning.

==== American impact ====
The association of Toryism with Lord North's government was also influential in the American colonies and writings of British political commentators known as the Radical Whigs did much to stimulate colonial republican sentiment. Early activists in the colonies called themselves Whigs, seeing themselves as in alliance with the political opposition in Britain, until they turned to independence and started emphasising the label Patriots. In contrast, the American Loyalists, who supported the monarchy, were consistently also referred to as Tories.

Later, the United States Whig Party was founded in 1833 on the basis of opposition to a strong presidency, initially the presidency of Andrew Jackson, analogous to the British Whig opposition to a strong monarchy. The True Whig Party, which for a century dominated Liberia, was named after the American party rather than directly after the British one.

==== Two-party system ====
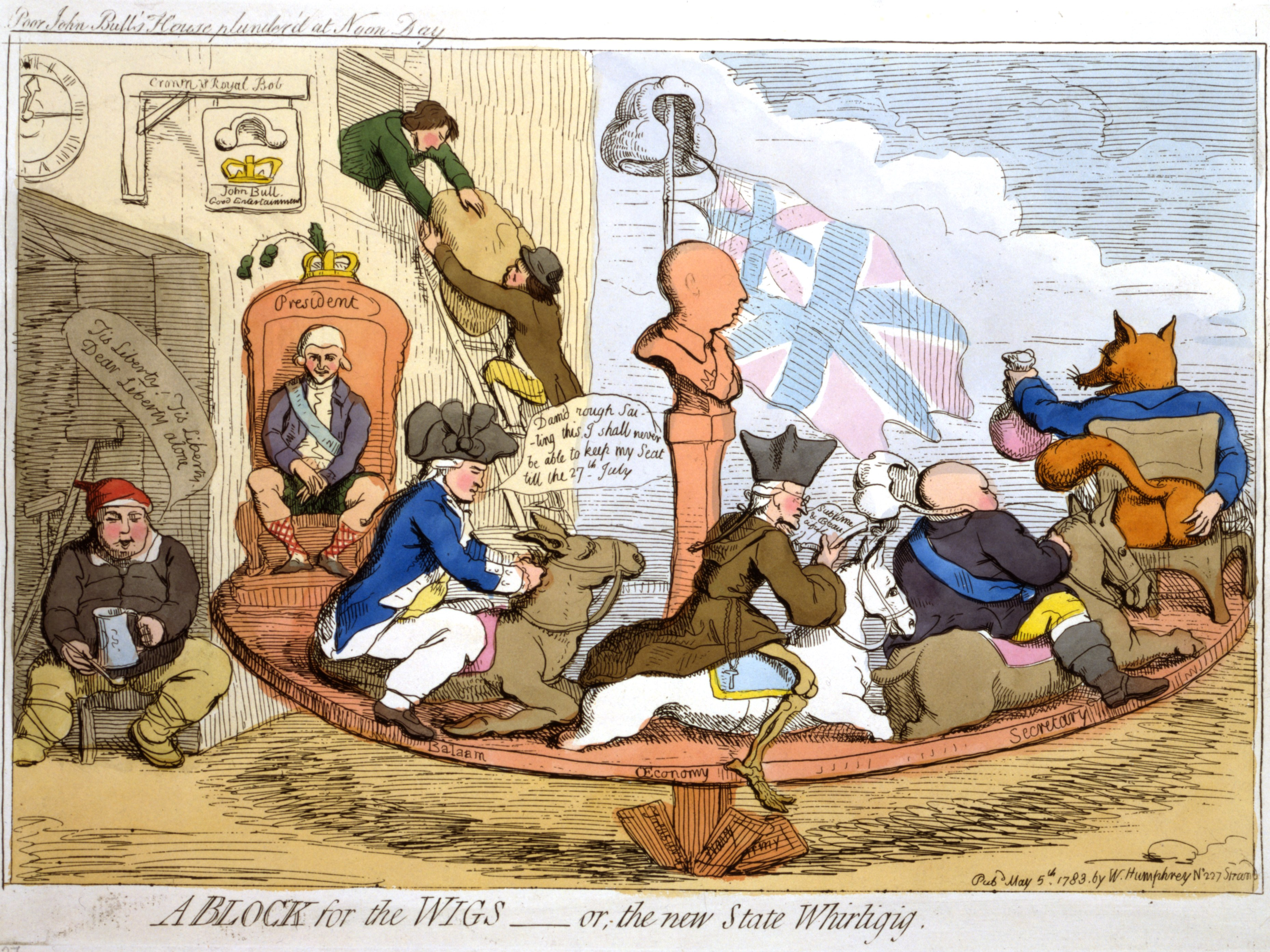
In A Block for the Wigs (1783), caricaturist James Gillray caricatured Charles James Fox's return to power in a coalition with Frederick North, Lord North (George III is the blockhead in the centre).

Dickinson reports the following:

All historians are agreed that the Tory party declined sharply in the late 1740s and 1750s and that it ceased to be an organized party by 1760. The research of Sir Lewis Namier and his disciples [...] has convinced all historians that there were no organized political parties in Parliament between the late 1750s and the early 1780s. Even the Whigs ceased to be an identifiable party, and Parliament was dominated by competing political connections, which all proclaimed Whiggish political views, or by independent backbenchers unattached to any particular group.

The North administration left power in March 1782 following the American War of Independence and a coalition of the Rockingham Whigs and the former Chathamites, now led by the Earl of Shelburne, took its place. After Rockingham's unexpected death in July 1782, this uneasy coalition fell apart, with Charles James Fox, Rockingham's successor as faction leader, quarrelling with Shelburne and withdrawing his supporters from the government. The following Shelburne administration was short-lived and Fox returned to power in April 1783, this time in an unexpected coalition with his old enemy Lord North. Although this pairing seemed unnatural to many at the time, it was to last beyond the demise of the coalition in December 1783. The coalition's untimely fall was brought about by George III in league with the House of Lords and the King now brought in Chatham's son William Pitt the Younger as his prime minister.

It was only now that a genuine two-party system can be seen to emerge, with Pitt and the government on the one side, and the ousted Fox-North coalition on the other. On 17 December 1783, Fox stated in the House of Commons that "[i]f [...] a change must take place, and a new ministry is to be formed and supported, not by the confidence of this House or the public, but the sole authority of the Crown, I, for one, shall not envy that hon. gentleman his situation. From that moment I put in my claim for a monopoly of Whig principles". Although Pitt is often referred to as a Tory and Fox as a Whig, Pitt always considered himself to be an independent Whig and generally opposed the development of a strict partisan political system. Fox's supporters saw themselves as legitimate heirs of the Whig tradition and they strongly opposed Pitt in his early years in office, notably during the regency crisis revolving around the King's temporary insanity in 1788–1789, when Fox and his allies supported full powers as regent for their ally, the Prince of Wales.

The opposition Whigs were split by the onset of the French Revolution. While Fox and some younger members of the party such as Charles Grey and Richard Brinsley Sheridan were sympathetic to the French revolutionaries, others led by Edmund Burke were strongly opposed. Although Burke himself was largely alone in defecting to Pitt in 1791, much of the rest of the party, including the influential House of Lords leader the Duke of Portland, Rockingham's nephew Lord Fitzwilliam and William Windham, were increasingly uncomfortable with the flirtations of Fox and his allies with radicalism and the French Revolution. They split in early 1793 with Fox over the question of support for the war with France and by the end of the year they had openly broken with Fox. By the summer of the next year, large portions of the opposition had defected and joined Pitt's government.

=== 19th century ===
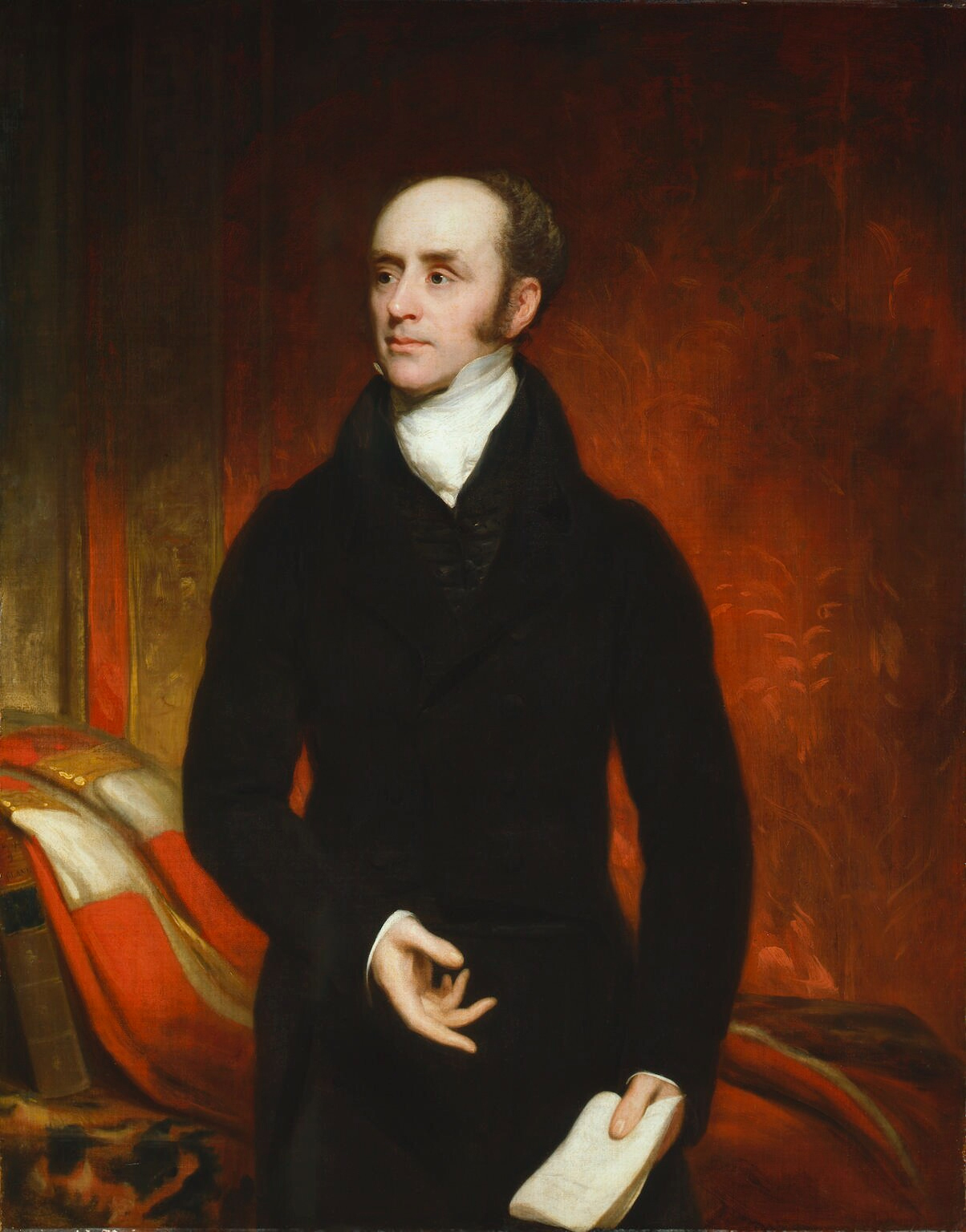
Portrait of Earl Grey by Thomas Phillips, 1820. Grey led the Whigs for many years in opposition.

Many of the Whigs who had joined with Pitt would eventually return to the fold, joining again with Fox in the Ministry of All the Talents following Pitt's death in 1806. The followers of Pitt—led until 1809 by Fox's old colleague the Duke of Portland—rejected the label of Tories and preferred to call themselves The Friends of Mr. Pitt. After the fall of the Talents ministry in 1807, the Foxite Whigs remained out of power for the better part of 25 years. The accession of Fox's old ally, the Prince of Wales, to the regency in 1811 did not change the situation, as the Prince had broken entirely with his old Foxite Whig companions. The members of the government of Lord Liverpool from 1812 to 1827 called themselves Whigs.

==== Structure and appeal ====
By 1815, the Whigs were still far from being a "party" in the modern sense. They had no definite programme or policy and were by no means even united. Generally, they stood for reducing crown patronage, sympathy towards nonconformists, support for the interests of merchants and bankers and a leaning towards the idea of a limited reform of the voting system. Most Whig leaders, such as Lord Grey, Lord Grenville, Lord Althorp, William Lamb (later Lord Melbourne) and Lord John Russell, were still rich landowners. The most prominent exception was Henry Brougham, the talented lawyer, who had a relatively modest background.

Hay argues that Whig leaders welcomed the increasing political participation of the English middle classes in the two decades after the defeat of Napoleon in 1815. The fresh support strengthened their position in Parliament. Whigs rejected the Tory appeals to governmental authority and social discipline and extended political discussion beyond Parliament. Whigs used a national network of newspapers and magazines as well as local clubs to deliver their message. The press organised petitions and debates and reported to the public on government policy, while leaders such as Henry Brougham (1778–1868) built alliances with men who lacked direct representation. This new approach to the grass roots helped to define Whiggism and opened the way for later success. Whigs thereby forced the government to recognise the role of public opinion in parliamentary debate and influenced views of representation and reform throughout the 19th century.

==== Return to power ====
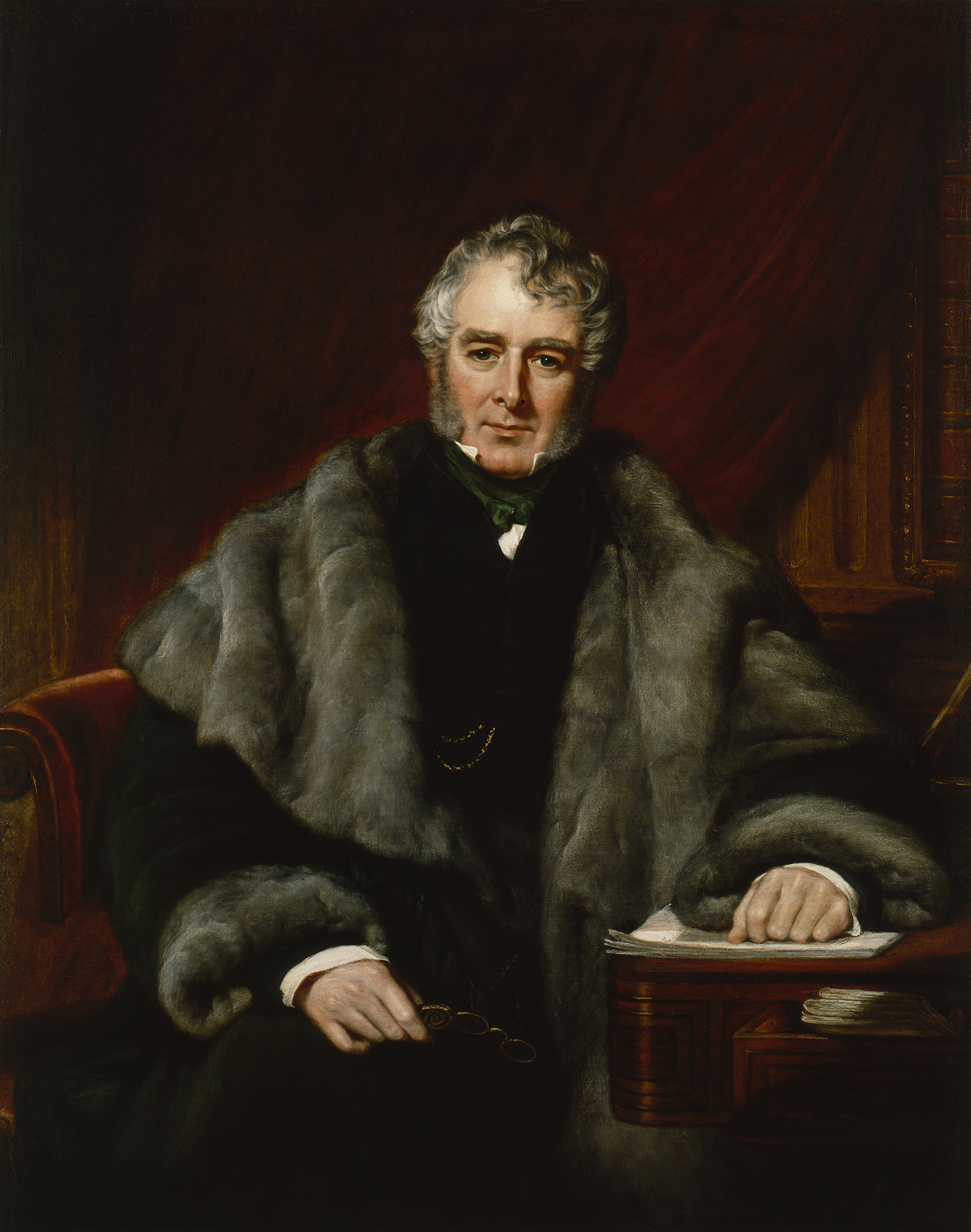
Portrait of Lord Melbourne by John Partridge. Melbourne was twice Prime Minister during the 1830s.

Whigs restored their unity by supporting moral reforms, especially the abolition of slavery. They triumphed in 1830 as champions of Parliamentary reform. They made Lord Grey prime minister 1830–1834 and the Reform Act 1832 championed by Grey became their signature measure. It broadened the franchise and ended the system of "rotten and pocket boroughs" (where elections were controlled by powerful families) and instead redistributed power on the basis of population. It added 217,000 voters to an electorate of 435,000 in England and Wales. Only the upper and middle classes voted, so this shifted power away from the landed aristocracy to the urban middle classes. In 1832, the party abolished enslavement in the British Empire with the Slavery Abolition Act 1833. It purchased and freed the slaves, especially those in the Caribbean sugar islands. After parliamentary investigations demonstrated the horrors of child labour, limited reforms were passed in 1833. The Whigs also passed the Poor Law Amendment Act 1834 that reformed the administration of relief to the poor and the Marriage Act 1836 that allowed civil marriages.

It was around this time that the great Whig historian Thomas Babington Macaulay began to promulgate what would later be coined the Whig view of history, in which all of English history was seen as leading up to the culminating moment of the passage of Lord Grey's reform bill. This view led to serious distortions in later portrayals of 17th-century and 18th-century history, as Macaulay and his followers attempted to fit the complex and changing factional politics of the Restoration into the neat categories of 19th-century political divisions.

In 1836, a private gentleman's Club was constructed in Pall Mall, Piccadilly as a consequence of the successful Reform Act 1832. The Reform Club was founded by Edward Ellice Sr., MP for Coventry and Whig Whip, whose riches came from the Hudson's Bay Company but whose zeal was chiefly devoted to securing the passage of the Reform Act 1832. This new club, for members of both Houses of Parliament, was intended to be a forum for the radical ideas which the First Reform Bill represented: a bastion of liberal and progressive thought that became closely associated with the Liberal Party, who largely succeeded the Whigs in the second half of the 19th century.

Until the decline of the Liberal Party in the early 20th century, it was de rigueur for Liberal MPs and peers to be members of the Reform Club, being regarded as an unofficial party headquarters. However, in 1882 the National Liberal Club was established under William Ewart Gladstone's chairmanship, designed to be more "inclusive" towards Liberal grandees and activists throughout the United Kingdom.

==== Transition to the Liberal Party ====
The Liberal Party (the term was first used officially in 1868, but had been used colloquially for decades beforehand) arose from a coalition of Whigs, free trade Tory followers of Robert Peel and free trade Radicals, first created, tenuously under the Peelite Earl of Aberdeen in 1852 and put together more permanently under the former Canningite Tory Lord Palmerston in 1859. Although the Whigs at first formed the most important part of the coalition, the Whiggish elements of the new party progressively lost influence during the long leadership of former Peelite William Ewart Gladstone. Subsequently, the majority of the old Whig aristocracy broke from the party over the issue of Irish home rule in 1886 to help form the Liberal Unionist Party, which in turn would merge with the Conservative Party by 1912. However, the Unionist support for trade protection in the early twentieth century under Joseph Chamberlain (probably the least Whiggish character in the Liberal Unionist party) further alienated the more orthodox Whigs. By the early twentieth century "Whiggery" was largely irrelevant and without a natural political home. One of the last active politicians to celebrate his Whiggish roots was the Liberal Unionist statesman Henry James.

== In popular culture ==
The colours of the Whigs, blue and buff, (a yellow-brown colour named after buff leather) were particularly associated with Charles James Fox. It is also seen in American portraits such as Washington at Princeton.

== Electoral performance ==
=== Parliament of England ===
Election	Leader	Seats	+/–	Position	Government
1661	Denzil Holles	139 / 518	▲139	▲2nd	Minority
March 1679	Anthony Ashley Cooper	218 / 522	▲79	▲1st	Plurality
October 1679	Anthony Ashley Cooper	310 / 530	▲92	1st	Majority
1681	Anthony Ashley Cooper	309 / 502	▼1	1st	Majority
1685	John Somers	57 / 525	▼252	▼2nd	Minority
1689	John Somers	319 / 551	▲262	▲1st	Majority
1690	John Somers	241 / 512	▼78	▼2nd	Minority
1695	John Somers	257 / 513	▲16	▲1st	Majority
1698	John Somers	246 / 513	▼11	1st	Plurality
January 1701	John Somers	219 / 513	▼27	▼2nd	Minority
November 1701	John Somers	248 / 513	▲29	▲1st	Plurality
1702	John Somers	184 / 513	▼64	▼2nd	Minority
1705	John Somers	233 / 513	▲49	2nd	Minority

=== Parliament of Great Britain ===
Election	Leader	Seats	+/–	Position	Government
1708	John Somers	291 / 558	▲45	▲1st	Minority
1710	John Somers	196 / 558	▼95	▼2nd	Minority
1713	John Somers	161 / 558	▼25	2nd	Minority
1715	Charles Townshend	341 / 558	▲180	▲1st	Majority
1722	Charles Townshend	389 / 558	▲48	1st	Majority
1727	Charles Townshend	415 / 558	▲26	1st	Majority
1734	Robert Walpole	330 / 558	▼85	1st	Majority
1741	Robert Walpole	286 / 558	▼44	1st	Majority
1747	Henry Pelham	338 / 558	▲52	1st	Majority
1754	Thomas Pelham-Holles	368 / 558	▲30	1st	Majority
1761	Thomas Pelham-Holles	446 / 558	▲78	1st	Majority
1768	Augustus FitzRoy	N/A		1st	Majority
1774	Charles Watson-Wentworth	215 / 558	▼ unknown	▼2nd	Minority
1780	Charles Watson-Wentworth	254 / 558	▲39	2nd	Minority
1784	Charles James Fox	155 / 558	▼99	2nd	Minority
1790	Charles James Fox	183 / 558	▲28	2nd	Minority
1796	Charles James Fox	95 / 558	▼88	2nd	Minority

=== Parliament of the United Kingdom ===
Election	Leader	Votes	%	Seats	+/–	Position	Government
1802	Charles James Fox	N/A		269 / 658	▲184	2nd	Minority
1806	William Grenville	N/A		431 / 658	▲162	▲1st	Majority
1807	William Grenville	N/A		213 / 658	▼218	▼2nd	Minority
1812	William Grenville	N/A		196 / 658	▼17	2nd	Minority
1818	Charles Grey	N/A		175 / 658	▼21	2nd	Minority
1820	Charles Grey	N/A		215 / 658	▲40	2nd	Minority
1826	Henry Petty-Fitzmaurice	N/A		198 / 658	▼17	2nd	Minority
1830	Henry Petty-Fitzmaurice	N/A		196 / 658	▼2	2nd	Majority
1831	Charles Grey	N/A		370 / 658	▲174	▲1st	Majority
1832	Charles Grey	554,719	67.0%	441 / 658	▲71	1st	Majority
1835	William Lamb	349,868	57.3%	385 / 658	▼56	1st	Majority
1837	William Lamb	418,331	51.7%	344 / 658	▼41	1st	Majority
1841	William Lamb	273,902	46.9%	271 / 658	▼73	▼2nd	Minority
1847	John Russell	259,311	53.8%	292 / 656	▲21	2nd	Majority
1852	John Russell	430,882	57.9%	324 / 654	▲32	2nd	Minority
1857	Henry John Temple	464,127	65.9%	377 / 654	▲53	▲1st	Majority
1859	Henry John Temple	372,117	65.7%	356 / 654	▼21	1st	Majority

== See also ==
- Early-18th-century Whig plots
- Foxite
- King of Clubs (Whig club)
- Kingdom of Great Britain
- List of United Kingdom Whig and allied party leaders (1801–1859)
- Patriot Whigs
- Whig government
- Whig Party (United States)
