= 1703 in literature =

Events from the year 1703 in literature.

== Events ==
- July 29–31 – Daniel Defoe is pilloried at Temple Bar, London, as part of a sentence for seditious libel, after publishing his satirical pamphlet The Shortest Way with the Dissenters (1702). He is released from Newgate Prison in mid-November.
- unknown date – Richard Mead is appointed physician at St Thomas's Hospital, London.

== New books ==
=== Prose ===
- Joseph Addison – A Letter from Italy
- Abel Boyer – The History of the Reign of Queen Anne
- Gilbert Burnet – A Third Collection of Several Tracts and Discourses
- Edmund Calamy – A Defence of Moderate Non-Conformity (volume 1)
- Jeremy Collier – Mr Collier's Dissuasive from the Play-House
- William Dampier – A Voyage to New Holland, &c. in the Year 1699
- Daniel Defoe
  - A Brief Explanation of a Late Pamphlet, entitled, The Shortest Way with the Dissenters
  - A Dialogue Between a Dissenter and the Observator
  - A Hymn to the Funeral Sermon
  - Hymn to the Pillory
  - More Reformation: A satyr upon himself
  - The Shortest Way to Peace and Union
  - A True Collection of the Writings of the Author of the True-Born English-man
- John Dunton – The Shortest Way with Whores and Rogues (satire on Defoe)
- Thomas Hearne – Reliquiae Bodleianae
- George Hickes – Linguarum veterum septentrionalium thesaurus grammatico-criticus et archæologicus
- Benjamin Hoadly – The Reasonableness of Conformity to the Church of England
- Louis-Armand de Lom d'Arce de Lahontan, Baron de Lahontan – New Voyages to North America
- Bernard de Mandeville – Some Fables After the Easie and Familiar Method of Monsieur de la Fontaine
- Leonty Magnitsky – Arithmetic (Арифметика)
- Henry Maundrell – A Journey from Aleppo to Jerusalem at Easter A.D. 1697
- Ned Ward – The Secret History of the Calves-head Clubb (against Republicanism)
- Benjamin Whichcote – Moral and Religious Aphorisms

=== Drama ===
- Thomas Baker – Tunbridge Walks
- Charles Boyle – As You Find It
- Marie-Anne Barbier – Cornélie, mère des Gracques
- William Burnaby – Love Betrayed
- Susanna Centlivre – Love's Contrivance
- Chikamatsu Monzaemon – The Love Suicides at Sonezaki (曾根崎心中, Sonezaki Shinjū)
- Thomas d'Urfey – The Old Mode and the New
- Richard Estcourt – The Fair Example
- Charles Gildon – The Patriot (adapted by Nathaniel Lee)
- John Oldmixon – The Governour of Cyprus
- Mary Pix – The Different Widows
- Nicholas Rowe – The Fair Penitent (published)
- Richard Steele – The Lying Lover
- William Walker – Marry, or Do Worse
- Richard Wilkinson – Vice Reclaimed

=== Poetry ===
- Lady Mary Chudleigh – Poems on Several Occasions
- William Congreve
  - A Hymn to Harmony
  - The Tears of Amaryllis for Amyntas
- Sarah Fyge Egerton – Poems on Several Occasions
- Pavao Ritter Vitezović – Plorantis Croatiae saecula duo (Two centuries of Croatia in mourning)
- See also 1703 in poetry

== Births ==
- March 23 – Cajsa Warg, Swedish cookbook author (died 1769)
- May 18 – İbrahim Hakkı Erzurumi, Turkish Sufi philosopher (died 1780)
- June 28 – John Wesley, English writer of sermons and hymns (died 1791)
- October 5 – Jonathan Edwards, American theologian (died 1758)
- November 26 – Theophilus Cibber, English playwright (died 1758)
- unknown dates
  - Henry Brooke, Irish novelist and dramatist (died 1783)
  - Charles Clémencet, French historian (died 1778)
  - Thomas Cooke, English writer and translator (died 1756)
  - John Ranby, English surgeon and writer on surgery (died 1773)
  - Ando Shoeki (安藤 昌益), Japanese philosopher (died 1762)
  - Gilbert West, English poet and translator (died 1756)

== Deaths ==
- January 11 – Johann Georg Graevius, German critic (born 1632)
- February 17 – Philippe Goibaud-Dubois, French translator (born 1626)
- March 3 – Robert Hooke, English natural philosopher (born 1635)
- March 5 – Gabrielle Suchon, French moral philosopher (born 1631)
- April 20 – Lancelot Addison, English writer and cleric (born 1632)
- May 8 – Vincent Alsop, English religious writer and wit (born c. 1630)
- May 16 – Charles Perrault, French writer of fairy tales (born 1628)
- May 26 – Samuel Pepys, English diarist (born 1633)
- August 21 – Thomas Tryon, English self-help author (born 1634)
- September 29 – Charles de Saint-Évremond, French essayist and literary critic (born 1631)
- unknown date – Samuel Johnson, English pamphleteer (born 1649)
