= The Fair Example =

Play by Richard Estcourt

- Original language: English
- Written by: Richard Estcourt
- Genre: Comedy

Premiere
- Date: 10 April 1703
- Place: Theatre Royal, Drury Lane

The Fair Example, or the Modish Citizen is a 1703 comedy play by the English writer Richard Estcourt, originally staged at the Drury Lane Theatre. It was part of a growing trend of plays to feature a plot of an honest wife reforming her rakish husband along with Sir Harry Wildair, As You Find It, The Wife's Relief and The Modish Couple. It is a reworking of the 1693 French play Les Bourgeoises à la Mode by Florent Carton Dancourt. In 1705 a separate English adaptation of the French work John Vanbrugh's The Confederacy appeared at the rival Queen's Theatre in the Haymarket.

The cast included Colley Cibber as Springlove, Anne Oldfield as Lucia, Benjamin Johnson as Sir Rice-ap-Adam, William Penkethman as Mr Whimsey, William Bullock as Mr Fancy, John Mills as Sir Charles, Henry Norris as Symons, Susanna Verbruggen as Mrs Cringe and Mary Powell as Mrs Furnish, Frances Maria Knight as Florinda, Margaret Mills as Lettice and Jane Lucas as Flora.

== Bibliography ==
- Burling, William J. A Checklist of New Plays and Entertainments on the London Stage, 1700-1737. Fairleigh Dickinson Univ Press, 1992.
- Gollapudi, Aparna. Moral Reform in Comedy and Culture, 1696–1747. Ashgate Publishing, 2013.
- Nicoll, Allardyce. History of English Drama, 1660-1900, Volume 2. Cambridge University Press, 2009.
