= John Mills (stage actor) =

British actor

John Mills (c.1670–1736) was a British stage actor. A long-standing part of the Drury Lane company from 1695 until his death, he appeared in both comedies and tragedies. His wife Margaret Mills was an actress, and his son William Mills also became an actor at Drury Lane.

He was a friend of the playwright Richard Steele and Robert Wilks the lead actor and manager at Drury Lane with whom he frequently appeared on stage. He died on 17 December 1736, thirteen days after performing in his final role as the King in Henry IV, Part 2.

== Selected roles ==
- Pedro in Agnes de Castro by Catherine Trotter (1695)
- Castillio in Neglected Virtue by Charles Hopkins (1696)
- Pisano in The Unhappy Kindness by Thomas Scott (1696)
- Lovewell in Love and a Bottle by George Farquhar (1698)
- Colonel Darange in The Campaigners by Thomas D'Urfey (1698)
- Vizard in The Constant Couple by George Farquhar (1699)
- Don Duart in Love Makes a Man by Colley Cibber (1700)
- Charles VIII in The Unhappy Penitent by Catharine Trotter (1701)
- Colonel Standard in Sir Harry Wildair by George Farquhar (1701)
- Rodomond in The Generous Conqueror by Bevil Higgons (1701)
- Menelaus in The Virgin Prophetess by Elkanah Settle (1701)
- Colonel Philip in The Bath by Thomas d'Urfey (1701)
- Don Guzman in The False Friend by John Vanbrugh (1702)
- Johnson in All for the Better by Francis Manning (1702)
- Trueman in The Twin Rivals by George Farquhar (1702)
- Queenlove in The Old Mode and the New by Thomas d'Urfey (1703)
- Lovemore in The Lying Lover by Richard Steele (1703)
- Sir Charles in The Fair Example by Richard Estcourt (1703)
- Loveworth in Tunbridge Walks by Thomas Baker (1703)
- Abdolin in The Faithful Bride of Granada by William Taverner (1704)
- Captain Smart in Hampstead Heath by Thomas Baker (1705)
- Seofrid in The Royal Convert by Nicholas Rowe (1707)
- Sir Harry Sprightly in The Fine Lady's Airs by Thomas Baker (1708)
- Oxartes in The Persian Princess by Lewis Theobald (1708)
- Charles in The Busie Body by Susanna Centlivre (1709)
- Captain Constant in The Man's Bewitched by Susanna Centlivre (1709)
- Carlo in The City Ramble by Elkanah Settle (1711)
- Boreal in The Successful Pyrate by Charles Johnson (1712)
- Sempronius in Cato by Joseph Addison (1713)
- Heartly in The Female Advocates by William Taverner (1713)
- Friendly in The Apparition by Anoymous (1713)
- Menelaus in The Victim by Charles Johnson (1714)
- Bellmour in Jane Shore by Nicholas Rowe (1714)
- Freehold in The Country Lasses by Charles Johnson (1715)
- Duke of Northumberland in Lady Jane Grey by Nicholas Rowe (1715)
- King of Lombardy in The Cruel Gift by Susanna Centlivre (1716)
- Fantome in The Drummer by Joseph Addison (1716)
- Colonel Woodvill in The Non-Juror by Colley Cibber (1717)
- Arminius in Lucius by Delarivier Manley (1717)
- Acomat in The Sultaness by Charles Johnson (1717)
- Sir Charles Winlove in Love in a Veil by Richard Savage (1718)
- Ausidius in The Invader of His Country by John Dennis (1719)
- Leonidas in The Spartan Dame by Thomas Southerne (1719)
- Nicanor in Busiris, King of Egypt by Edward Young (1719)
- Caled in The Siege of Damascus by John Hughes (1720)
- Zanga in The Revenge by Edward Young (1721)
- Valens in The Briton by Ambrose Philips (1722)
- Ned Freeman in The Artifice by Susanna Centlivre (1722)
- Sir John Bevil in The Conscious Lovers by Richard Steele (1722)
- Adam in Love in a Forest by Charles Johnson (1723)
- Richard, Duke of York in Humphrey, Duke of Gloucester by Ambrose Philips (1723)
- Zimon in The Fatal Constancy by Hildebrand Jacob (1723)
- Hydarnes in The Captives by John Gay (1724)
- Photinus in Caesar in Egypt by Colley Cibber (1724)
- Agamemnon in Hecuba by Richard West (1726)
- Sagely in The Rival Modes by James Moore Smythe (1727)
- Manly in The Provoked Husband by Colley Cibber (1728)
- Wisemore in Love in Several Masques by Henry Fielding (1728)
- Arcas in Love in a Riddle by Colley Cibber (1729)
- Colonel Truelove in The Humours of Oxford by James Miller (1730)
- Creon in Medea by Charles Johnson (1730)
- Timoleon in Timoleon by Benjamin Martyn (1730)
- Syphax in Sophonisba by James Thomson (1730)
- Periander in Eurydice by David Mallet (1731)
- Claremont in The Modish Couple by James Miller (1732)
- Meanwell in Caelia by Charles Johnson (1732)
- Heartwell in The Mother-in-Law by James Miller (1735)
- Junius Brutus in Junius Brutus by William Duncombe (1734)
- Freelove in The Man of Taste by James Miller (1735)
- Aranthes in The Christian Hero by George Lillo (1735)

== Bibliography ==
- Highfill, Philip H, Burnim, Kalman A. & Langhans, Edward A. A Biographical Dictionary of Actors, Actresses, Musicians, Dancers, Managers, and Other Stage Personnel in London, 1660-1800: Garrick to Gyngell. SIU Press, 1978.
