= The Younger Brother, or, The Amorous Jilt =

Comedic play

The Younger Brother
- Original language: English
- Written by: Aphra Behn
- Genre: Comedy

Premiere
- Date: February 1696
- Place: Theatre Royal, Drury Lane, London

The Younger Brother, or, The Amorous Jilt is a comedy written by Aphra Behn. The play was first performed and published posthumously in 1696, but was probably written in the late 1680s.

The first published version of this play (February 1696) included the first biography of Behn, and this was probably written by Charles Gildon.

It was staged at the Theatre Royal, Drury Lane in London, likely in early February 1696. The original cast included John Verbruggen as Prince Frederick, Benjamin Johnson as Sir Rowland Marteen, George Powell as George Marteen, Hildebrand Horden as Welborn, William Pinkethman as Sir Merlin Marteen, William Bullock as Sir Morgan Blunder, Thomas Kent as Brittone, Frances Maria Knight as Mirtilla, Susanna Verbruggen as Olivia, Elizabeth Willis as Mrs Menage and Mary Powell as Lady Blunder.

== Plot ==
The old but wealthy Lady Youthly is due to marry George, an impoverished younger brother.

George's father, Sir Rowland, is due to marry Lady Youthly's granddaughter, Tereisa.

Mirtilla is the 'amorous jilt' of the title. She previously dropped George in order to marry the wealthy Sir Morgan Blunder. She has an affair with George's friend Prince Frederick, and also pursues a young page (in reality the page is George's sister Olivia disguised as a boy). In the end, Prince Frederick gives Mirtilla an alibi and returns her to Sir Morgan, who agrees to let the Prince visit her in the future.

The play concludes with a wedding between George and Tereisa, and a celebratory dance.

== Reception ==
The Younger Brother is in some respects a conventional romantic comedy. However, Peggy Thompson calls the play Behn's "bleak final vision" about the lot of women, saying that "the final lines remind us that the weddings in this play also mark the triumph of a patriarchal, objectifying system: George gloats that his 'younger Brother's share is one that's Rich, Witty, Young and Fair'".

== Bibliography ==
- Van Lennep, W. The London Stage, 1660-1800: Volume One, 1660-1700. Southern Illinois University Press, 1960 .
