= Jane Lucas =

English actress

Jane Lucas (fl. 1693 – 1707) was an English stage actress and singer of the late seventeenth and early eighteenth century.

== Career ==
Lucas was a member of the United Company based at the Theatre Royal, Drury Lane between 1693 and 1707.

=== Early career and performance for King William III: 1693–1698 ===
Lucas's career began in 1693 when she performed a supporting dancing role in a production under Christopher Rich. She remained loyal to Rich during her time as a performer.

A dancer, singer, and actor, Lucas primarily played servants and commoners in minor roles throughout her career, though she eventually became known to theatre-goers in her own right for her dancing and musical performances. By late 1696, Lucas was billed as herself in performing her signature song, By Moonlight on the Green. Reported to be a Scottish tune with lyrics by Thomas D’Urfey, Lucas performed the song with sexual overtones.

On 13 May 1698, Camille d'Hostun, French ambassador to the Court of St James's, staged a showcase of French music and dances in Kensington for William III. The showcase was an act of cultural diplomacy, as France and England had signed peace treaties ending the Nine Years' War in the autumn of the previous year. A mix of performers from the Paris Opéra and London theatres were selected to participate in the staging, and Lucas performed as a bride in a wedding scene alongside celebrated French dancer Anthony L’Abbé, who played the groom.

=== Public profile and decline: 1699–1707 ===
Drury Lane advertising described Lucas as an audience "favourite" by 1702. Advertising for the Drury Lane troupe also occasionally relied upon actors being known to the public as personalities in their own right. Lucas was publicised as having a penchant for coffee, which became a recurring joke during performances. One performance involved Lucas, playing herself, arriving 'late' for a scene due to drinking coffee backstage.

Lucas's final known role with the United Company was that of Constance in The Northern Lass by Richard Brome, performed 26 December 1707.

An order issued by the Lord Chamberlain on 31 December effectively mandated that all operatic or musical productions could only be performed at the Queen's Theatre, and only stage entertainments not set to music could be performed at Drury Lane. The purpose of this order was to address growing competition between the two theatres. Following the order, Lucas was among several minor players who no longer appeared on rosters for Drury Lane productions.

== Accusation of assault against Colley Cibber ==
In July 1697, Lucas brought a suit for assault against fellow actor Colley Cibber, resulting in Cibber's imprisonment. The previous year, Lucas had performed a minor role in Cibber's play, Love's Last Shift.

Cibber wrote to the Earl of Sunderland, Lord Chamberlain, seeking his release on the grounds that Lucas had not sought Sunderland's permission to have Cibber arrested. At the time, the Drury Theatre's lead actors were under the Lord Chamberlain's protection.

Cibber was not prosecuted and Lucas continued to play alongside Cibber in the United Company. Theatre historian Fidelis Morgan posits that Lucas likely continued to work with Cibber because little alternative work existed for actresses at the time.

== Legacy ==
The 1719 entry into an anthology of songs published by Thomas d'Urfey, Wit and Mirth, included several songs noted to have been favourites of Lucas. The anthology also contained a tribute to her, suggesting she had remained recognisable in popular artistic knowledge at this time.

In 2023, the Curious Bards, a French band dedicated to Gaelic and Celtic traditional music, recorded a version of By Moonlight on the Green, acknowledging Lucas as the song's originator.

== Notable performances ==
- Lucy Welldon in Oroonoko by Thomas Southerne (1695)
- Amanda's servant in Love's Last Shift by Colley Cibber (1696)
- Maukine in Pausanius by Richard Norton (1696)
- Sue in The Cornish Comedy by George Powell (1696)
- Lucy in The Perjured Husband by Susanna Centlivre (1700)
- Parley in Sir Harry Wildair by George Farquhar (1701)
- Mademoiselle in The Funeral by Richard Steele (1701)
- Clora in All for the Better by Francis Manning (1702)
- Malapert in Vice Reclaimed by Richard Wilkinson (1703)
- Lettice in The Lying Lover by Richard Steele (1703)
- Flora in The Fair Example by Richard Estcourt (1703)
- Mrs Edging in The Careless Husband by Colley Cibber (1704)
- Alpiew in The Basset Table by Susanna Centlivre (1705)
- Mrs. ap Shinken in Hampstead Heath by Thomas Baker (1705)
- Jenny in Farewell Folly by Pierre Motteux (1705)
- Lucy in Tunbridge Walks by Thomas Baker (1707)
