= The Sham Lawyer =

- Original language: English
- Written by: James Drake
- Genre: Comedy

Premiere
- Date: 31 June 1697
- Place: Theatre Royal, Drury Lane, London

The Sham Lawyer is a 1697 comedy play by the English writer James Drake. It is also known by the longer title The Sham Lawyer, or, the Lucky Extravagant.

The original Drury Lane cast included Colley Cibber as Careless, William Bullock as Sergeant Wrangle, Benjamin Johnson as Homily, Joseph Haines as Spade, William Pinkethman as Famine, Frances Maria Knight as Olympia, Jane Rogers as Florella and Mary Powell as Mrs Vernish.

== Bibliography ==
- Lowerre, Kathryn. Music and Musicians on the London Stage, 1695-1705. Routledge, 2017.
- Van Lennep, W. The London Stage, 1660-1800: Volume One, 1660-1700. Southern Illinois University Press, 1960 .
