= An Act at Oxford =

1704 play

- Original language: English
- Written by: Thomas Baker
- Genre: Comedy

Premiere
- Date: 30 October 1705
- Place: Drury Lane Theatre

An Act at Oxford is a 1704 comedy play by the English writer Thomas Baker. Although scheduled to appear at the Theatre Royal, Drury Lane that year it had censorship problems from the Lord Chamberlain, likely through the influence of the Oxford University authorities. Although performed earlier it did not have its London debut at Drury Lane until October 1705 under the alternative title of Hampstead Heath.

The 1705 cast includes Robert Wilks as Bloom, John Mills as Captain Smart, Colley Cibber as Lampoon, William Bullock as Squire Calf, Benjamin Johnson as Deputy Driver, William Pinkethman as Chum, Anne Oldfield as Arabella, Susanna Mountfort as Berynthia and Jane Lucas as Mrs ap Shinken.

== Bibliography ==
- Burling, William J. A Checklist of New Plays and Entertainments on the London Stage, 1700-1737. Fairleigh Dickinson Univ Press, 1992.
- Turner, David M. Fashioning Adultery: Gender, Sex and Civility in England, 1660–1740. Cambridge University Press, 2002.
