= Neglected Virtue =

- Written by: Charles Hopkins
- Original language: English
- Genre: Tragedy

Premiere
- Date premiered: February 1696
- Place premiered: Theatre Royal, Drury Lane

Neglected Virtue is a 1696 tragedy by the Irish writer Charles Hopkins. It is also known by the longer title Neglected Virtue; or, The Unhappy Conquerour.

The original Drury Lane cast included George Powell as Phraates, Hildebrand Horden as Artaban, Thomas Disney as Memnon, John Mills as Castillio, William Pinkethman as Castillio junior, William Bullock as Bretton, Thomas Simpson as Curio, Jane Rogers as Alinda, Mary Powell as Eudora, Frances Maria Knight as Thermusa and Margaret Mills as Emilia.

== Bibliography ==
- Watson, George. The New Cambridge Bibliography of English Literature: Volume 2, 1660–1800. Cambridge University Press, 1971.
