= The Old Mode and the New =

- Original language: English
- Written by: Thomas d'Urfey
- Genre: Comedy

Premiere
- Date: 11 March 1703
- Place: Theatre Royal, Drury Lane, London

The Old Mode and the New is a 1703 comedy play by the English writer Thomas d'Urfey.

The original Drury Lane cast included Benjamin Johnson as Sir Fumbler Oldmode, Robert Wilks as Frederick, John Mills as William Queenlove, William Bowen as Monsieur de Pistole, Colley Cibber as Tom Pistole, William Pinkethman as Misterious Maggothead, Richard Cross as Major Bombard, William Bullock as Abram, Henrietta Moore as Lady Oldmode, Frances Maria Knight as Probleme and Anne Oldfield as Lucia. The play was dedicated to Duke of Richmond, a son of Charles II.

== Bibliography ==
- Burling, William J. A Checklist of New Plays and Entertainments on the London Stage, 1700-1737. Fairleigh Dickinson Univ Press, 1992.
