= The Constant Couple =

1699 play

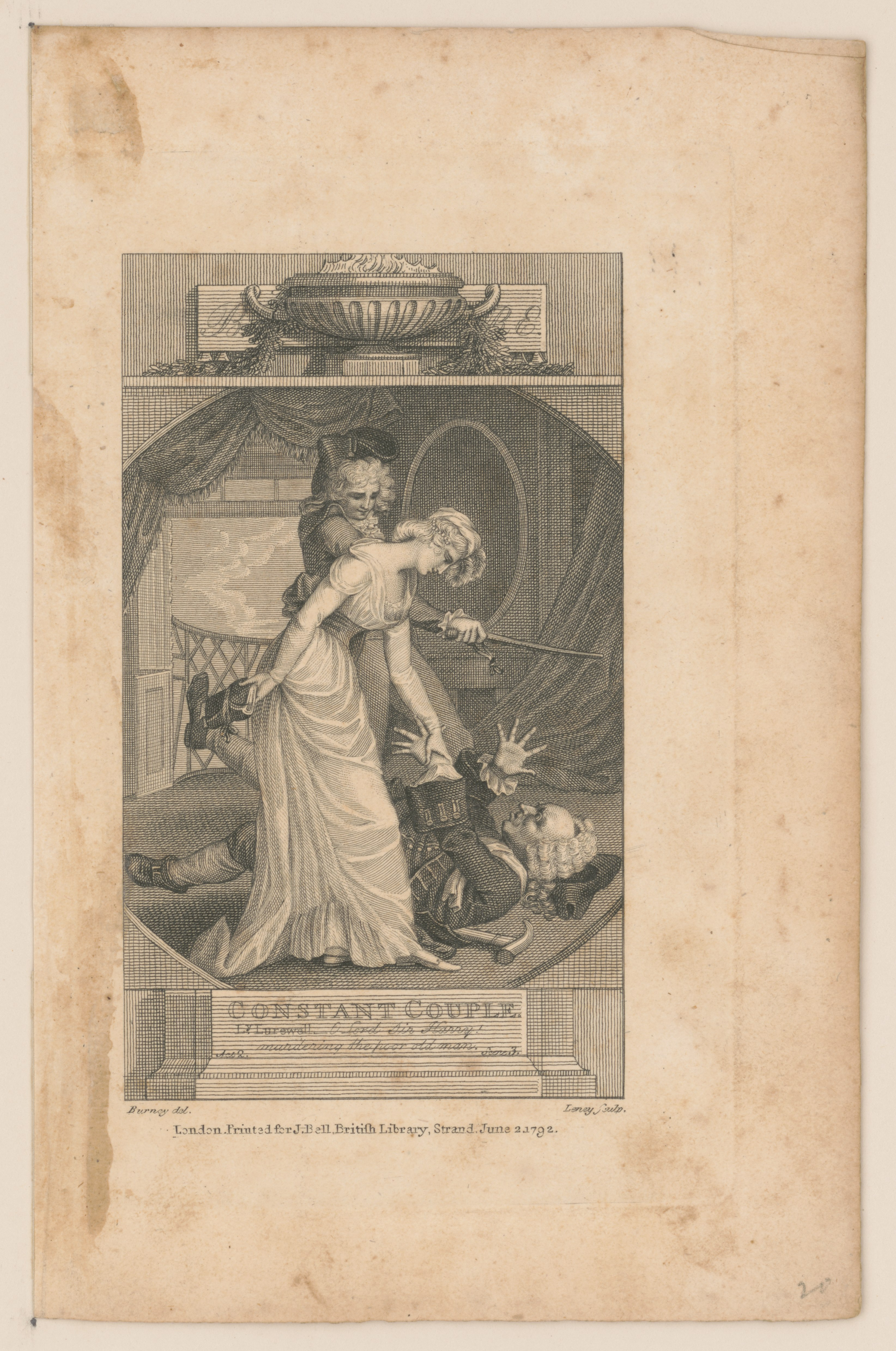
- Late 18th-century depiction of a scene from the play.
- Original language: English
- Written by: George Farquhar
- Genre: Restoration Comedy

Premiere
- Date: 28 November 1699
- Place: Drury Lane Theatre, London

The Constant Couple is a 1699 play by the Irish writer George Farquhar. It is part of the Restoration comedy tradition, and is often described as a sentimental comedy. It marked the first major success of Farquhar's career. A series of comic misunderstandings are triggered when three rivals vie for the hand of the wealthy heiress Lady Lurewell.

It was staged at the Drury Lane Theatre in London. The original cast included Robert Wilks as Sir Harry Wildair, George Powell as Standard, John Mills as Vizard, Benjamin Johnson as Smugler, William Pinkethman as Clincher Senior, William Bullock as Clincher Junior, Henry Norris as Dicky, Joseph Haines as Tom Errand, Susanna Verbruggen as Lurewell, Jane Rogers as Angelica, Mary Powell as Lady Darling and Henrietta Moore as Parly. The hero and most popular character, the rakish Sir Harry Wildair was revived for a sequel Sir Harry Wildair in 1701.

For several decades the part of Sir Harry was strongly identified with the actor Robert Wilks, and became his signature role. It was later taken over by the Irish actress Peg Woffington, who performed it as a breeches role. Dorothea Jordan also played the part as did Samuel Foote. Actresses who have played the role of Lady Lurewell included Anne Oldfield and Hannah Pritchard. William Bullock appeared in the original run as Clincher.

Numerous revivals of the play have taken place over subsequent centuries.

== Bibliography ==
- Morash, Christopher. A History of Irish Theatre 1601-2000. Cambridge University Press, 2002.
