= The Modish Husband =

1702 play by William Burnaby

- Original language: English
- Written by: William Burnaby
- Genre: Comedy

Premiere
- Date: January 1702
- Place: Drury Lane Theatre

The Modish Husband is a 1702 comedy play by the English writer William Burnaby. It is in the Restoration-style comedy of manners.

Staged at the Drury Lane Theatre in London, the cast included Robert Wilks as Lionel, Colley Cibber as Lord Promise, Anne Oldfield as Camilla, Susanna Verbruggen as Lady Cringe, Jane Rogers as Lady Promise, William Bullock as Harry and William Pinkethman as Will Fanlove.

== Bibliography ==
- Burling, William J. A Checklist of New Plays and Entertainments on the London Stage, 1700-1737. Fairleigh Dickinson Univ Press, 1992.
- Lowerre, Kathryn. Music and Musicians on the London Stage, 1695-1705. Routledge, 2017.
