= A Plot and No Plot =

Play by John Dennis

- Written by: John Dennis
- Original language: English
- Genre: Comedy

Premiere
- Date premiered: 8 May 1697
- Place premiered: Theatre Royal, Drury Lane, London

A Plot and No Plot is a 1697 comedy play by the English writer John Dennis.

The original Drury Lane cast included Thomas Doggett as Bull senior, Colley Cibber as Bull junior, William Pinkethman as Baldernoe, Joseph Haines as Rumour, William Bullock as Frowzy, Jane Rogers as Sylvia and Mary Kent as Friskit.

== Bibliography ==
- Lowerre, Kathryn. Music and Musicians on the London Stage, 1695-1705. Routledge, 2017.
- Van Lennep, W. The London Stage, 1660-1800: Volume One, 1660-1700. Southern Illinois University Press, 1960 .
- Watson, George. The New Cambridge Bibliography of English Literature: Volume 2, 1660-1800. Cambridge University Press, 1971.
