= The Recruiting Officer =

1706 play by George Farquhar

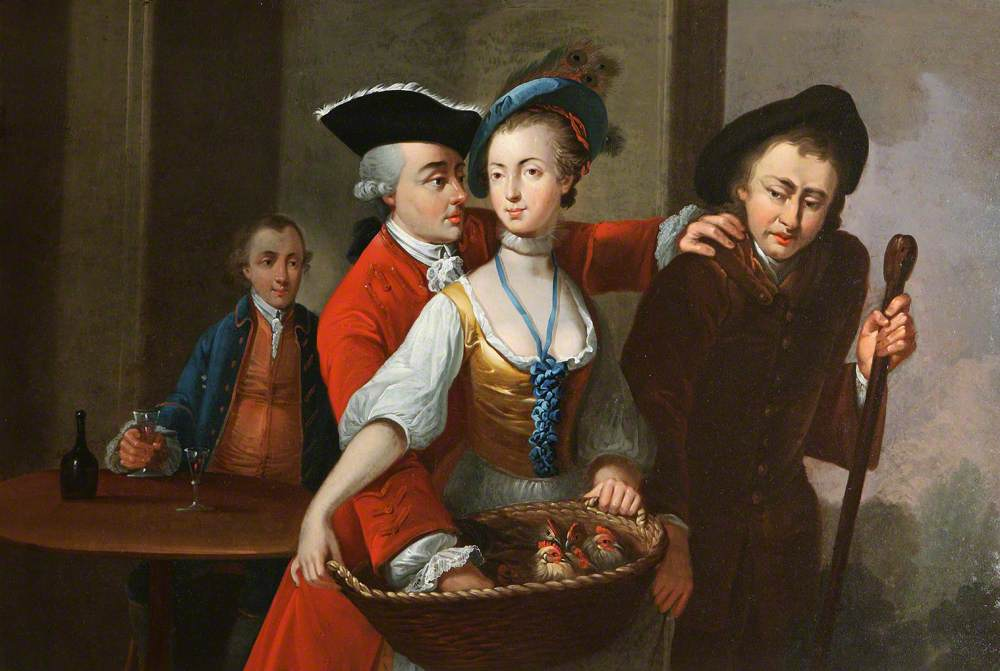
- Robert Wilks as Captain Plume
- Original language: English
- Written by: George Farquhar
- Genre: Restoration Comedy
- Setting: Shrewsbury, England

Premiere
- Date: 8 April 1706
- Place: Theatre Royal, Drury Lane, London

The Recruiting Officer is a 1706 play by the Irish writer George Farquhar, which follows the social and sexual exploits of two English Army officers, the womanising Plume and the cowardly Brazen, in the town of Shrewsbury (the town where Farquhar himself was posted in this capacity) to recruit soldiers. The characters of the play are generally stock, in keeping with the genre of Restoration comedy.

== Characters ==
Men
Mr Balance
Mr Scale	Three Justices
Mr Scruple
Mr Worthy	a gentleman of Shropshire
Capt. Plume	Two Recruiting Officers
Capt. Brazen
Kite	Sergeant to Plume
Bullock	a Country Clown
Costar Pear-main	Two Recruits
Tho. Apple-Tree
Women
Melinda	a Lady of Fortune
Sylvia	Daughter to Balance, in love with Plume
Lucy	Melinda's maid
Rose	a Country Wench
Constable, Recruits, Mob,
Servants, Attendants

== Plot ==

The play opens with Captain Plume's Sergeant Kite recruiting in the town of Shrewsbury. Plume arrives, in love with Sylvia, closely followed by Worthy, a local gentleman who is in love with Sylvia's cousin Melinda. Worthy asked Melinda to become his mistress a year previously, as he believed her to be of inadequate fortune to marry but he changes his mind after she comes into an inheritance of £20,000. Melinda accepts an invitation from Captain Brazen, another recruiter, to annoy Worthy, as she was offended by Worthy's previous offer. However, her maid Lucy meets Brazen, pretending to be Melinda, hoping to marry him herself. Melinda and Sylvia argue after Melinda says that the money she has inherited makes her more desirable. Sylvia, who is more down to earth, is infuriated by Melinda's newly haughty behaviour.

Sylvia leaves her father's house to mourn her brother Owen's death. She tells her father Balance that she is going to the Welsh countryside but in fact goes into Shrewsbury dressed as a man, under the name 'Jack Wilful'. There Brazen and Plume compete to recruit 'Wilful', unaware of 'his' real identity. Kite abducts 'him' for Plume while Plume duels with Brazen. Still disguised as Wilful, Sylvia goes on to spend the night in bed with Rose, a local wench previously courted by Plume to get Rose's brother Bullock to join up. An action is brought against 'Wilful' for sexually assaulting Rose and 'he' finds 'himself' on trial before Sylvia's father Balance and his two fellow magistrates Scruple and Scale. The three magistrates also look into Kite's dubious recruiting practices but finally acquit him and force Wilful to swear to the Articles of War.

Meanwhile, Melinda continues to discourage Worthy, until going to a fortune teller (in fact Kite in disguise), where she is convinced to relent and accept his courtship. She is also tricked by being given a sample of her handwriting by the 'fortune teller', who takes it from a 'devil' he has conjured up under the table (in fact Plume). Kite is then visited by Brazen, who gives him a love letter from, as he thinks, Melinda. However, by comparing the handwriting sample, Worthy discovers that the letter is in fact from Melinda's maid Lucy, who hopes to ensnare Brazen as a husband.

Worthy then goes to visit Melinda but, on going to tell Plume the good news, finds out that Melinda seems to be eloping with Brazen after all. Worthy intercepts Brazen and a disguised woman whom he takes to be Melinda, and challenges Brazen to a duel. The duel is prevented when the woman drops her disguise and reveals herself to be Lucy. Sylvia also drops her disguise. Plume agrees to leave the army and marry her, Melinda relents towards Worthy and agrees to marry him, and Plume transfers his twenty recruits to Brazen to compensate him for the loss of a rich marriage with Melinda.

== Production history ==
The Recruiting Officer opened at Drury Lane in 1706. It was an immediate hit and went on to become one of the most frequently performed plays of the 18th century. The part of the foppish Brazen proved a significant role for the actor-manager Colley Cibber. The rest of the cast included Robert Wilks as Plume, Theophilus Keene as Ballance, Thomas Kent as Scale, Joseph Williams as Worthy, Richard Estcourt as Kite, William Bullock as Bullock, Henry Norris as Costar Pearmain, Jane Rogers as Melinda, Anne Oldfield as Silvia and Susanna Mountfort as Rose.

The Recruiting Officer was the first play to be staged in New York City, at the Theatre on Nassau Street on 6 December 1732. It was the first performance of the original Dock Street Theatre in Charleston, South Carolina, in 1736.

It was also the first play to be staged in the Colony of New South Wales, which is now Australia, by the convicts of the First Fleet in 1789 under the governance of Captain Arthur Phillip RN (also Commodore of the First Fleet).

The best remembered modern revival was staged at the National Theatre Company Theatre (while based at the Old Vic) in 1963 – its inaugural season. Directed by William Gaskill, its cast which included Laurence Olivier as Brazen, Robert Stephens as Plume, Colin Blakely as Kite, Derek Jacobi as Worthy, Maggie Smith as Silvia and Mary Miller as Melinda.

The National Theatre staged the play again in 1991 with Desmond Barrit as Brazen, Alex Jennings as Plume and Ken Stott as Kite. It was directed by Nicholas Hytner.

In 2012 Donmar Warehouse staged a revival starring Tobias Menzies as Captain Plume, Mark Gatiss as Brazen and Mackenzie Crook as Kite.

American Players Theatre included The Recruiting Officer in its 2018 repertory season with Nate Burger as Plume, Marcus Truschinski as Brazen, Jefferson A. Russell as Kite and directed by William Brown.

=== TV adaptations ===
There have been two television adaptations of the play. The first for Australian television in 1965, the second a BBC Play of the Month (1973). The latter, of which only fragments are believed to survive, was directed by David Giles, and starred Ian McKellen as Plume, Prunella Ransome as his sweetheart Sylvia, Jane Asher as Melinda, John Moffatt as Brazen, and Brian Blessed as Sergeant Kite.

== Adaptations ==
The German dramatist Bertolt Brecht adapted The Recruiting Officer as the play Trumpets and Drums in 1955.

It was the first play performed in Australia. Thomas Keneally wrote a novel, The Playmaker, based on a staging of the play in Sydney by those who came ashore from the First Fleet. That novel was adapted into a play, Our Country's Good, in 1988, by Timberlake Wertenbaker. Both works deal with the nature and merits of punishment, rehabilitation and theatre.
