= Jane Rogers (actress, died 1718) =

English actress

Jane Rogers (died 1718) was an English stage actress. To distinguish her from her daughter she is sometimes referred to as Jane Rogers the Elder.

She first appeared at Theatre Royal, Drury Lane in 1692 in Thomas Shadwell's The Volunteers. Following the split of the United Company in 1695, she remained at Drury Lane with Christopher Rich's company rather than join the breakaways under Thomas Betterton. She benefited from the departed of Anne Bracegirdle with whom she had been competing for roles and became one of the leading members of the company.

Sometimes in the 1690s she gave birth to Jane Rogers reportedly following a liaison with fellow actor Robert Wilks. Her daughter later became an actress as part of the Lincoln's Inn Fields company, where she married Christopher Bullock and was consequently known by his surname.

The elder Rogers continued at Drury Lane until 1706, when she switched to the new Queen's Theatre in the Haymarket. She then returned to Drury Lane where she stayed, apart from another season spent at the Haymarket until 1714, although she was increasingly in dispute with the company and found several of her roles given to Anne Oldfield. She was then recruited by John Rich for the revived Lincoln's Inn Fields, where her daughter began acting shortly afterwards. The elder Rogers remained with the company until her death in November 1718.

== Selected roles ==
- Winifred in The Volunteers (1692)
- Maria in The Maid's Last Prayer (1693)
- Lucy in The Female Virtuosos (1693)
- Mirvan in The Ambitious Slave (1694)
- Jacinta in The Canterbury Guests (1694)
- Berinthia in The Rival Sisters (1695)
- Marina in The Mock Marriage (1695)
- Claudia in Bonduca (1695)
- Imoinda in Oroonoko (1695)
- Agnes de Castro in Agnes de Castro (1695)
- Bellario in Philaster (1695)
- Amanda in Love's Last Shift (1696)
- Marina in The Lost Lover (1696)
- Anchilthea in Pausanius (1696)
- Morena in Ibrahim, the Thirteenth Emperor of the Turks (1696)
- Evanthe in The Unhappy Kindness (1696)
- Amanda in The Relapse (1696)
- Alinda in Neglected Virtue (1696)
- Emelia in Woman's Wit (1697)
- Bellamira in The Triumphs Of Virtue (1697)
- Sylvia in A Plot and No Plot (1697)
- Florella in The Sham Lawyer (1697)
- Lucinda in Love and a Bottle (1698)
- Honoria in Love Without Interest (1699)
- Angelica in The Constant Couple (1699)
- Ann in Richard III (1699)
- Angelica in Sir Harry Wildair (1701)
- Armida in The Generous Conqueror (1701)
- Margarita in The Unhappy Penitent (1701)
- Sophronia in The Bath (1701)
- Cassandra in The Virgin Prophetess (1701)
- Constance in The Twin Rivals (1702)
- Leonora in The False Friend (1702)
- Teraminta in The Patriot (1702)
- Isabella in All for the Better (1702)
- Belinda in Tunbridge Walks (1703)
- Lucinda in Love's Contrivance (1703)
- Penelope in The Lying Lover (1703)
- Annabella in Vice Reclaimed (1703)
- Zelinda in The Faithful Bride of Granada (1704)
- Melinda in The Recruiting Officer (1706)
- Clarinda in The Double Gallant (1707)
- Isabinda in The Busie Body (1709)
- Virginia in Appius and Virginia (1709)
- Lucia in The City Ramble (1711)
- Luciana in The Perfidious Brother (1716)
- Lady Outside in Woman Is a Riddle (1716)

== Bibliography ==
- Highfill, Philip H, Burnim, Kalman A. & Langhans, Edward A. A Biographical Dictionary of Actors, Actresses, Musicians, Dancers, Managers, and Other Stage Personnel in London, 1660-1800: Volume 13. SIU Press, 1991.
