= Woman's Wit (Cibber play) =

1697 play

- Original language: English
- Written by: Colley Cibber
- Genre: Comedy
- Setting: London, present day

Premiere
- Date: January 1697
- Place: Theatre Royal, Drury Lane, London

Woman's Wit is a 1697 comedy play by the English writer Colley Cibber. It premiered at the Theatre Royal, Drury Lane. Cibber had originally written the play for the performers of Thomas Betterton's company at Lincoln's Inn Fields and he partly attributed the work's failure to the differing qualities styles of the rival Drury Lane company. The original Drury Lane cast included Cibber as Longville, William Pinkethman as Major Rakish, George Powell as Jack Rakish, Thomas Doggett as Johnny, Mary Powell as Lady Manlove, Jane Rogers as Emilia, Catherine Cibber as Olivia and Mary Kent as Lettice.

== Bibliography ==
- Van Lennep, W. The London Stage, 1660-1800: Volume One, 1660-1700. Southern Illinois University Press, 1960.
- Viator, Timothy J. & Burling, William J. The Plays of Colley Cibber, Volume 1. Fairleigh Dickinson Univ Press, 2001.
