= Robert Wilks =

17th/18th-century English actor and theatre manager

Robert Wilks (c. 1665 – 27 September 1732) was a British actor and theatrical manager who was one of the leading managers of Theatre Royal, Drury Lane in its heyday of the 1710s. He was, with Colley Cibber and Thomas Doggett, one of the "triumvirate" of actor-managers that was denounced by Alexander Pope and caricatured by William Hogarth as leaders of the decline in theatrical standards and degradation of the stage's literary tradition.

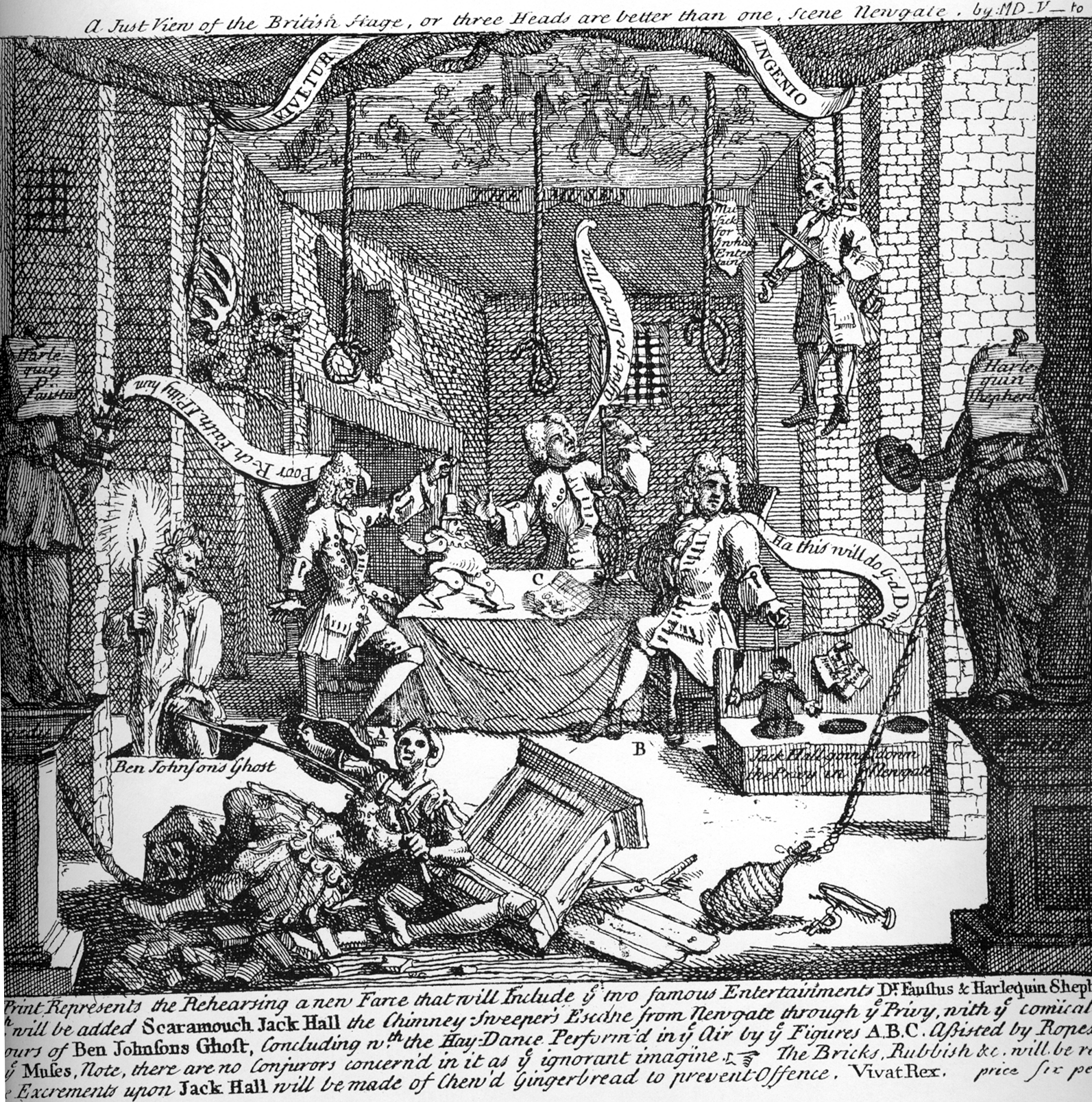
A print by William Hogarth entitled A Just View of the British Stage from 1724 depicting Robert Wilks, Colley Cibber, and Barton Booth rehearsing a pantomime play with puppets enacting a prison break down a privy. The "play" is composed of nothing but special effects, and the scripts for Hamlet, inter al., are toilet paper.

The family was based for many generations in Bromsgrove, Worcestershire. His great-uncle, Judge Wilks, had served Charles I of England during the English Civil War, for whom he raised a troop at his own expense. After Oliver Cromwell won the civil war, Wilks' father moved to Dublin, where Robert Wilks was born.

He was a clerk to Robert Southwell until he joined the Williamite army. As soon as he was discharged from the army, he worked in the Smock Alley Theatre in Dublin from 1691 to 1693. According to Wilks's version of the story, he had first acted when his army company put on an amateur Othello, and he was so successful that he took up acting as a career. In 1693, Christopher Rich, manager of Drury Lane, hired him to work in London. The same year, he married Elizabeth Knapton.

In 1698, he was back in Dublin to perform in George Etherege plays, and he was so popular that he, according to his story, had to escape to London, and the next year he began his collaboration of George Farquhar. Farquhar and Wilks were close friends, and the two traveled from Dublin to London together. In 1699, Wilks appeared in Farquhar's The Constant Couple as Harry Wildair. It was a role that became Wilks's signature, and it made him a heartthrob among the young ladies of London. For the rest of his life Harry Wildair would be Wilks's alter ego, and Wilks would appear in the starring roles in Farquhar plays.

At Drury Lane, Christopher Rich ruled the theater with a Machiavellian hand. In 1702, Rich had to choose between Wilks and George Powell, the director of rehearsals. The power struggle went Wilks's way, and Powell left for Lincoln's Inn Fields while Wilks was promoted to director of rehearsals. This put Wilks in a powerful position within the theater, and when the actor's strike occurred in 1706, Wilks was well placed to win. Rich was accused of taking one third of all the actors' profits, and the leading actors walked out for the Queen's Theatre at the Haymarket (now Her Majesty's Theatre). Rich, and his son, John Rich, responded by staging opera and pantomime.

At the Haymarket, Wilks was a star. He took the major roles in 1 Henry IV, Hamlet, Julius Caesar, and The Way of the World. He also debuted Farquhar's The Beaux' Stratagem and Nicholas Rowe's The Royal Convert. In 1709, Wilks, with Cibber, Thomas Doggett, and Anne Oldfield joined Owen Swiny in managing the Haymarket. The next year, the group won their struggle and was brought back to Drury Lane, and in 1711 they became the actor-managers of Drury Lane. Thomas Doggett, according to Colley Cibber's somewhat unreliable memoir, forbade any woman being part of the group of managers, and Owen Swiny decided to return to the Haymarket, and so the remaining actor managers formed a "triumvirate." These three managers had profitable and difficult positions, and it is likely that from 1711 to 1714 the shares of the triumvirate never made less than the fantastic sum of £1,000 a year.

In 1713, Barton Booth replaced Doggett as actor-manager, and in 1714 Richard Steele joined them and got the theatre a royal patent. This patent allowed the company to present Charles Johnson's The Country Lasses without a license in 1715, and from then on the patent itself was an extremely valuable commodity. Upon Steele's death in 1729, the three current members of the triumvirate got a one-third share in the patent.

The managers were very busy with the details of production, but they were as busy as actors. Wilks acted one hundred and forty performances in the 1721–2 season, for example, and Wilks rarely toured out of London (with the exception of a single trip to Dublin in 1711). Wilks was one of the mainstays of Drury Lane, both as a manager and, even more, as an attractive male lead. Colley Cibber, whose autobiography portrays himself as a voice of reason and calm, paints Wilks as a vain and tempestuous personality, and it is possible to believe Cibber's complaints about others without believing his praise of himself. Alexander Pope satirized Wilks, along with Cibber and Doggett, in The Dunciad, both versions. William Hogarth depicted Wilks as a man busy making a pantomime play of a jail break while using scripts for Hamlet as toilet paper. The actor managers responded to the increasing move for "spectacle" plays (see Augustan drama for context) and quick productions with low costs, and thus the triumvirate, in particular, was frequently satirized for cheapening the stage.

He died in 1732 in London and was buried in St. Paul's Church, Covent Garden. He had made an exceptional amount of money in his life, but, upon his death, he left his second wife virtually nothing except a share in the Drury Lane patent.

Although married at the time, in the 1690s he had relationship with the actress Jane Rogers which led to the birth of a daughter of the same name Jane Rogers, who appeared as an actress at Lincoln's Inn Field and Covent Garden during the eighteenth century.

== Selected roles ==
- Sir Harry Wildair in The Constant Couple by George Farquhar (1699)
- Carlos in Love Makes a Man by Colley Cibber (1700)
- Duke of Lorraine in The Unhappy Penitent by Catharine Trotter (1701)
- Almerick in The Generous Conqueror by Bevil Higgons (1701)
- Paris in The Virgin Prophetess by Elkanah Settle (1701)
- Sir Harry Wildair in Sir Harry Wildair by George Farquhar (1701)
- Lionel in The Modish Husband by William Burnaby (1702)
- Don Pedro in The False Friend by John Vanbrugh (1702)
- Woodvil in All for the Better by Francis Manning (1702)
- Woudbee in The Twin Rivals by George Farquhar (1702)
- Reynard in Tunbridge Walks by Thomas Baker (1703)
- Bellmie in Love's Contrivance by Susanna Centlivre (1703)
- Frederick in The Old Mode and the New by Thomas d'Urfey (1703)
- Wilding in Vice Reclaimed by Richard Wilkinson (1703)
- Young Bookwit in The Lying Lover by Richard Steele (1703)
- Abinomin in The Faithful Bride of Granada by William Taverner (1704)
- Sir Charles Easy in The Careless Husband by Colley Cibber (1704)
- Bloom in Hampstead Heath by Thomas Baker (1705)
- Captain Plume in The Recruiting Officer by George Farquhar (1706)
- Captain Beaumont in The Platonick Lady by Susanna Centlivre (1706)
- Archer in The Beaux' Stratagem by George Farquhar (1707)
- Careless in The Double Gallant by Colley Cibber (1707)
- Aribert in The Royal Convert by Nicholas Rowe (1707)
- Brigadier Blenheim in The Fine Lady's Airs by Thomas Baker (1708)
- Artaban in The Persian Princess by Lewis Theobald (1708)
- Ziphares in Mithridates, King of Pontus by Nathaniel Lee (1708)
- Sir George Airy in The Busie Body by Susanna Centlivre (1709)
- Icilius in Appius and Virginia by John Dennis (1709)
- Young Outwit in The Rival Fools by Colley Cibber (1709)
- Volatil in The Wife's Relief by Charles Johnson (1711)
- Aranes in The Successful Pyrate by Charles Johnson (1712)
- Juba in Cato by Joseph Addison (1713)
- Chaucer in The Wife of Bath by John Gay (1713)
- Dumont in Jane Shore by Nicholas Rowe (1714)
- Agamemnon in The Victim by Charles Johnson (1714)
- Modely in The Country Lasses by Charles Johnson (1715)
- Sir George Trueman in The Drummer by Joseph Addison (1716)
- Agonistus in The Cruel Gift by Susanna Centlivre (1716)
- Hearty in The Non-Juror by Colley Cibber (1717)
- Memnon in Busiris, King of Egypt by Edward Young (1719)
- Eurytion in The Spartan Dame by Thomas Southerne (1719)
- Sir George Jealous in The Masquerade by Charles Johnson (1719)
- Eumanes in The Siege of Damascus by John Hughes (1720)
- Frankly in The Refusal by Colley Cibber (1721)
- Don Carlos in The Revenge by Edward Young (1721)
- Sir John Freeman in The Artifice by Susanna Centlivre (1722)
- Ivor in The Briton by Ambrose Philips (1722)
- Mrytle in The Conscious Lovers by Richard Steele (1722)
- Orlando in Love in a Forest by Charles Johnson (1723)
- Antony in Caesar in Egypt by Colley Cibber (1724)
- Phraortes, King of Media in The Captives by John Gay (1724)
- Henriquez in Double Falsehood by Lewis Theobald (1727)
- Ballamine in The Rival Modes by James Moore Smythe (1727)
- Merital in Love in Several Masques by Henry Fielding (1728)
- Lord Townly in The Provoked Husband by Colley Cibber (1728)
- Jason in Medea by Charles Johnson (1730)
- Gainlove in The Humours of Oxford by James Miller (1730)
- Masinissa in Sophonisba by James Thomson (1730)
- Bellamant in The Modern Husband by Henry Fielding (1732)
- Lord Modely in The Modish Couple by James Miller (1732)
