= King John and the Bishop =

Traditional song

"King John and the Bishop" is an English folk-song dating back at least to the 16th century. It is catalogued in Child Ballads as number 45 and Roud Folk Song Index 302.

It tells how King John, covetous of the bishop of Canterbury's wealth, compels him on pain of death to answer three impossible questions. The bishop's shepherd appears in disguise to substitute in his place, and answers the questions cleverly in riddle fashion, after which the appeased king rewards the shepherd and spares the bishop. Like the ballad, historical King John had a reputation of confiscating property from the clergy. (Note: Philips 1723, Old Ballads II, pp.49-50, in commentary to the ballad: "..when [King John] had taken a Mind to any Man's Estate, (especially a Churchman's, for those he frequently chased)" it would have been out of character for him to as allow as much as three days to his victim, or so the anthologist has heard from skeptics who felt the ballad must have originally featured some other monarch.)

The ballad is classified as Aarne-Thompson folktale type "AT 922" of the shepherd substituting for the priest to answer the king's questions (For analogues, see Parallels below). Analogues are widespread, some of them being literary works dating to medieval times.

== Synopsis ==
King John in the opening lines is described as a man who did much wrong and did little to uphold what was right. Enraged that the bishop (variant B, the abbot) of Canterbury maintained a household with many servants and riches paid by comfortable income, the king summons him to court, accuses him of treason, threatening him with beheading and the confiscation of income afterwards, unless the cleric can correctly answer three questions:

- How long does it take to travel the whole world?
- How much money am I worth?
- What am I thinking?

The king sends the bishop off, allowing a thinking period of twenty days (B, three days). (Note: In A he then rides to Oxford and Cambridge seeking learned men to give him the right answer, only to be derided. In B he rides straight to his country home.) The distressed bishop returns to his shepherd (who in A is his own half-brother), and confides his dilemma. The shepherd says, "Lend me your clothes, I will deliver the correct answers for you". The disguised shepherd then meets King John. His answers are:

- A twenty-four-hour day. If you rise in the morning and follow the sun's movement the whole day long, until you wait for the sun to come up in the same place the following morning. Then you'll have traveled the world around.
- Judas sold Christ for thirty pieces of silver. You are worth almost as much as Christ. You are worth 29 pieces of silver.
- You are thinking I am the bishop of Canterbury. In fact I am a shepherd in disguise.

Impressed by the clever response, the king offers the appointment of the shepherd as bishop. This the shepherd diffidently declines, at which the king awards him a monetary pension, and pardons the bishop as well. (Note: In B, the pension is four pounds per week, which calculates to a larger sum. In A, the king offers 300 pounds a year, the brother offers 50 more, and the shepherd declares he no longer will tolerate keeping sheep for his brother.)

== Commentary ==
On the one hand the song is an oblique reference to the poor relationship between King John and the archbishop of Canterbury. On the other hand, it can be enjoyed as a clever riddle-song.

=== The Derry down refrain ===
The "Derry down" chorus belongs very much to the sixteenth century, and occurs in many ballads. William Chappell ventured to guess that the ballad entitled "A defence for Mylkemaydes against the terme of Mawken" (before 1563-4), with the refrain "Down, a-downe, &c." might have been set to the same tune.

=== Historical background ===
King John's father, Henry II, indirectly made a martyr of Thomas a Beckett. Like his father, John had a conflict with the Catholic Church, and refused to ratify the Pope's choice for the post of the Archbishop of Canterbury, Stephen Langton. The Pope responded with bureaucratic constraints, and in retaliation John removed from office several bishops.

The idea that a shepherd, or the lesser brother of a bishop, could out-wit a king, is quite subversive. Most of the Robin Hood ballads have the same characteristics, except that the sheriff is in place of the king. King John is closely associated with Robin Hood, so perhaps this is not a coincidence.

There is also the suggestion that the educated bishop (or abbot) is not as wise as the uneducated brother (or shepherd) - implying there is a "native wit" that is more valuable than school-book wisdom.

The song has been found in England, Scotland, and the United States. The historical aspects of the song are for most people a mere backdrop to the real appeal of the song, as a riddle.

== Textual variants ==
Child's variant A is the poem "Kinge John and Bishopp" taken from the Percy Folio manuscript. Variant B is from a broadside copy, printed for P. Brooksby between 1672-85 in which at the end of each verse, the burden (chorus) "Derry down" is sung. On the broadside that Child used, an inscription appears below the title indicates the ballad is to be sung to the tune of "The King and the Lord Abbot": this Child thinks was an older ballad which has not survived. (Note: On the dating range: Child gives 1672-1695 as date, but the licensing issued to Roger l'Estrange gives 1685 terminus ante quem, and used so in Ebsworth 1889, Roxb. Ball. VI., p.749, note after ballad. EBBA also assigns "1672-1685 ?" for the Roxburghe copy.)

=== Broadsides ===
Before Child, broadside copies of the ballad were printed in D'Urfey's Wit and Mirth or Pills to Purge Melancholy (1719–1720) with music, and in Collection of Old Ballads (1723), with commentary.

There are various broadside copies extant, with different titles. Some are illustrated with woodcuts: (Note: In various literature, the ballad may also be referred by such names as: "The Bishop of Canterbury"; "The Bishop of Canterbury and King John"; "The Bishop of Old Canterbury"; "King and the Abbot"; "King John"; "The King's Three Questions"; (Robert B. Waltz; David G. Engle (2013). "King John and the Bishop [Child 45]". The Ballad Index. Archived from the original on 2004-10-21.))

- "A New Ballad of King John and the Abbot of Canterbury"
  - Golden Ball in Pye-Corner: printed for Philip Brooksby, ca. 1672-95. (=Child Ballad #45B)
- "King John and the Abbot of Canterbury"
  - London: printed by Aldermary Church Yard, [1760?].
  - Northampton : printed by William Dicey, [1735?]
- "An excellent ballad of King John and the abbot of Canterbury"
  - Newcastle upon Tyne: printed by John White, between 1711 and 1769

== Ballads with different kings ==
Child mentions that "there are at least two other broadsides extant upon the same subject," noted earlier by Bishop Percy. These feature different monarchs, and popularly they were sung to different tunes. Child did not print these texts, but the texts were printed in consecutive fashion by the Ballad Society in 1889.

=== King Henry and bishop ===
King and the Bishop This ballad begins "In Popish time, when Bishops proud..", and was performed to the melody of The Ballad of Chevy Chase. The king here is either an unknown or as "some say 'twas Henry" according to the ballad. The three riddles are substantially the same. There are minute discrepancies in detail, such as the king allowing three week grace period, demanding that his worth be guessed to within a half crown (rather than a penny).

=== Old abbot and king Offa or Alfred ===
The Old Abbot and King Olfrey This is a piece that begins ""In old times past there was a King,"" and was set to the tune of "The Shaking of the Sheets". "King Olfrey" has been theorized to be either the Anglo-Saxon king Offa, or "a corruption of Alfred".

== Parallels ==
As Child has pointed out, King John and the Bishop (Child ballad #45) might easily be seen as a part of an "extensive" group of ballads, if the common factor used as the criterion is that of containing a riddle-match frame story, with a major stake if the riddles could not be solved. (Note: As compared with six riddling questions asked in "Captain Wedderburn's Courtship" (Child ballad 46). "Riddles Wisely Expounded" (Child 1) has a similar character.)

=== Folklore motif type AT 922 ===
The Ballad of King John and the Bishop exhibits the folklore motif Type "AT 922: The Shepherd Substituting for the Priest Answers the King's Questions (The King and the Abbot)" under the Aarne-Thompson classification system, and is the primary example through which this motif class is "known.. to the English speaking world," according to Stith Thompson.

To encompass some of the oriental examples it seems, the précis of this motif index is more loosely stated; thus according to Marzolph AT 922 constitutes "Schwierige Fragen klug beantwortet (Difficult question answered wisely)."

A large group of works that can be classed as being of AT 922 type has been examined by German folklorist Walter Anderson, in his monograph Kaiser und Abt ("Emperor and the Abbot", 1923), whose title is named after the German counterpart of the ballad story. (Note: As to the title cf. the 15th-century German play "Ein Spil von einem Kaiser und eim Apt", probably by Hans Folz, and Bürger's 1784 ballad. Anderson also compiled Der Schwank von Kaiser und Abt bei den Minsker Juden from the Jews in Minsk.) In it, he compiled some 474 variants across to the Asian continent and spanning from German, Scandinavian to Turkic and Finno-Ugric languages; of these, 410 were oral, all dating to the 19th and 20th century. (Note: Anderson's tally of "variants equal 571. Of these, 410 are oral and 161 are literary", but only counted 64 of the literary examples as stemming in oral transmission. Claus, Peter J.; Korom, Frank J. (1991). Folkloristics and Indian folklore. Regional Resources Centre for Folk Performing Arts, Mahatma Gandhi Memorial College. p. 85.) Among the group Anderson analyzed, 85% featured a surrogate who gives the correct answers to the puzzles. And in 81.4% the interrogator was a monarch: John Lackland, Charles Quint or even Pharaoh Sheshonk in some variants.

=== Tales with same three riddles ===
The actual riddles posed in the large motif group do show discrepancies. In Anderson's analysis, the selection came off a list of sixteen questions. In some tales however, the sets of questions and answers used are extremely close to the three exchanged in the English ballad.

center of the earth

Child noted three identical riddles (preceded by an extra one: "Where is the center of the earth?") were asked in local lore around James V; in it, the king aka "Gudeman of Ballengeigh" ask these questions to a priest of Markinch.

Presten og klokkeren

The Norwegian folktale Presten og klokkeren (Asbjornsen and Moe's Norske Folkeeventyr Ny Samling No. 26) is classed AT 922 also matches closely in riddle content. The tale appears in English under the title "The Priest and the Clerk" (Dasent tr.) or "The Parson and The Sexton" (Patrick Shaw Iversen tr.). In the folktale, a priest who is in the habit of shouting everyone else to swerve when he is travelling the road gets in trouble by behaving the same way before the king, who threatens to defrock him if he is not competent to answer them. The priest condescendingly says a fool can stump ten wise men with questions, and refuses to the king, so his clerk makes the appearance. When asked "How far the east is from west?" the clerk replies "A day's journey," for that is the course the sun takes between rising and setting. The king's worth? -- No more than 29 silver pieces (Sølvpenge) since Christ was worth thirty pieces of silver. The king's thought? -- that the priest stands before him, but he must stand corrected for he is the clerk. By the king's decree, the clerk was appointed priest and the priest demoted to clerk.

king worth 29 pence

The short stories (novelle) of Franco Sachetti (died c. 1400) include a tale, in two forms, in which one of the questions concurs with the ballads: the Bernabò Visconti asks what is his worth, and the miller appraises him as no more than 29 deniers. In "Ein Spil von einem Kaiser und eim Apt," a 15th-century Fastnachtsspiel (shrovetide miracle play) about "An Emperor and an Abbot," the miller masquerading as abbot assesses the kaiser's worth at 28 pennies (or 4 groschen, after ascertaining the going rate was 1 Gr. = 7 pfennig). The three riddles in Johannes Pauli (d. after 1530) Schimpf und Ernst are very similar to the play's.

=== Other medieval parallels ===
Der Stricker's tale Pfaffe Âmis (13th century) is about the English Priest Amis whose well-to-do lifestyle earns the Bishop's displeasure, but fends off five questions of examination posed to him; this tale is an imperfect analogue since not substitution is made and the priest answers himself. In the Gesta Romanorum (late 13th to early 14th century) is a tale of a knight compelled to answer difficult questions before a king: in the English version of the Gesta, the number of questions is seven. The Speculum Morale (14th century) a later addition to Vincent of Beauvais's works records a story of a king who tried to relieve a wealthy wise man of some of his riches by stumping him with questions, only to be foiled. Another parallel he noted was Till Eulenspiegel, who was summoned to university to answer such questions as "how much water is there in the sea?" (Note: Rimbault also observes that Till Eulenspiegel tells the story, although he calls it the adventures of Howleglas printed by Copland, an English translation of an originally Lower Saxon tale.)

By a more recent scholar, the ballad has been suggested as a possible source to "The Tale of the Three Questions" in John Gower (d. 1408)'s Confessio Amantis. Here the King is guilty of envy, asks three difficult questions, and a distant relative of inferior standing comes to the rescue. The king sets a similar time limit as in the ballad. The riddles differ, but has been suggested that the ballad was re-written in the sixteenth or seventeenth century with fresh new riddles, and so generate extra sales.

Thus kindred riddle-tales certainly existed since the Middle Ages, and according to some, "originated before 850 A.D. in a Jewish parish in the Near East."

=== Literary adaptations ===
The English ballad was available through its printing in Percy's Reliques of Ancient English Poetry (1765), and Gottfried August Bürger composed a German adaption of it entitled Der Kaiser und der Abt (prob. 1784; translated "Emperor and the Abbot").

Retellings:

- Jacobs, Joseph (1894). "King John and the Abbot". More English Fairy Tales. David Nutt. pp. 146–149. - a prose tale adapted from both ballad variants.
- James Balwin, Fifty Famous Stories Retold (1896) - retelling.

== Music ==
Though a much older tune to King John and the Bishop of Canterbury seems to have existed, it had been "abridged and modernized about the time of King James I," and became known as "The Abbot of Canterbury," in the estimation of Bishop Percy.

=== Published music notes ===
The music notes (with blank lyrics) was printed, preceding the ballad text, in Pills to Purge Melancholy (1719). The melody was also printed with lyrics to an unrelated ballad printed in Watt's Musical Miscellany (1729). Edward Francis Rimbault provided musical history on the tune (on this and other pieces in Percy's Reliques) Chappell & Macfarren's work expands on the musicology.

Percy Grainger collected a version on July 27, 1906, from Joseph Skinner. Helen Hartness Flanders made a field recording on wax cylinder some time between 1930 and 1958. She and Alan Lomax collected several versions of the song in 1939, in particular, one from Elmer George and one from Mrs. M. P. Daniels (East Calais, Vermont).

The song has disseminated from England to the United States and Canada. The historical aspects of the song are for most people a mere backdrop to the real appeal of the song, as a riddle. The versions from the USA, and versions collected in the twentieth century are less likely to depict King John as a villain in the opening verse.

=== Recordings ===
Album/Single	Performer	Year	Variant	Notes
"Burly Banks of Barbry O: Eight Traditional British-American Ballads"	Elmer George	1953	"King John and Bishop"	.
"Child Ballads Traditional in the United States, Vol. 1"	Warde H Ford	1960 (recorded 1938)	"The Bishop of Canterbury"	.
"All Things in Common"	Chris Foster	1979	"King John and the Abbot of Canterbury"	.
"Contentment Or, the Compleat Nutmeg-state songster"	Jim Douglas	1986	"King John and the Bishop"	.
"D-Major Singers Vol 3"	D-Major singers	1994	"Bishop of Canterbury"	.
"Ballads Thrice Twisted"	Margaret MacArthur	1999	"King John and the Bishop"	.

=== Shaking of the Sheets ===
"The Old Abbot and King Olfrey", is a closely similar riddle-ballad with a different king. The tune which this is set is different, and known as "Shaking of the Sheets". It was printed with this title in 1776 in Hawkins' History of Music. It also appears as "Shakinge of the Sheetes" in William Ballet's lute manuscript. A tune of this title appears in the Stationers' Register of 1568/9. The title is also mentioned in a play of 1560. The words that accompany this tune are a witty comparison between the bedsheets (a dance of life) and the winding sheets (the dance of death). "Shaking of the sheets" is sung by Steeleye Span on the album Tempted and Tried and by The City Waites on Ghosts, Witches and Demons (1995).

John Playford's 1650 manual The Dancing Master gives the tune as "The Night Peece". Only with difficulty can the words of the Percy manuscript text be made to fit this version of the tune. The tune also goes by the name "Derry Down". "The Night Peece" is the name of a dance in Playford's books.

== Musical adaptations ==
In 1891 Charles Josph Frost wrote a cantata "King John and the Abbot of Canterbury" based on the ballad.

=== Other songs with the same tune ===
Thomas Baker's 1703 play Tunbridge Walks contains the ballad, but only the opening verses. This was followed by instances of the tune being used on stage several times over the next 50 years, with different words. Below is a list of such ballad opera:

- Love and Revenge (1729) by Bullock, Christopher (d. 1724), song XI, begins "The Damsel who deals in the Business of Love.."
- Penelope (1728) by Thomas Cooke and John Mottley, song begins "How idle the Notion of Birth and of Blood!"
- The Village Opera, by Charles Johnson, Song XIX, begins "Of all Servants here's Choice, pretty Maids, jolly Boys"
- The Beggar's Wedding (1729) by Charles Coffey, song begins "When beggars do marry for better for worse".
  - He used the tune again in The Devil To Pay (1731), and yet again in The Boarding School (1733).
- The Lover His Own Rival (1736) by Abraham Langford, song begins "The Priests, like the Lawyers, are all of a Gang".
- Tumble-Down Dick (1736) by Henry Fielding, Air V, begins "You Wonder Perhaps at the Tricks of the Stage"

William Shenstone's ballad The Gossiping contains the "Derry Down" refrain and was written for the tune of King John and the Abbot of Canterbury.

In 1750 The Gentleman's Magazine published a song called "A Ballad of New Scotland", to be sung to the tune "King John and the Abbot of Canterbury". "New Scotland" is a reference to Halifax in Canada, founded 1749. A collection of songs called The Button Hole Gallery (c 1720 - 1750) contains a riddling song called "The Button Hole". It was sung to the air "The Abbot of Canterbury". It reappeared as part of a collection of songs called Merry Songs (1897), edited by John S. Farmer.

== Modern popular culture ==
- Hugh Lupton, Riddle Me This! Riddles and Stories to Challenge Your Mind (2003) - illustrated children's book that contains "The Riddle Song" and "King John and the Bishop of Canterbury".
- Jan Mark, King John and the Abbot (2006) - illustrated children's book based on the song.

== See also ==
- Ballad opera
