= Vice Reclaimed =

1703 play

- Original language: English
- Written by: Richard Wilkinson
- Genre: Comedy

Premiere
- Date: 23 June 1703
- Place: Theatre Royal, Drury Lane, London

Vice Reclaimed is a 1703 comedy play by Richard Wilkinson. It is also known by the longer title Vice Reclaim'd: Or, the Passionate Mistress.

It premiered at the Drury Lane Theatre included Benjamin Johnson as Sir Feeble Goodwill, Robert Wilks as Wilding, Joseph Williams as Gainlove, William Bullock as Fondle, Henry Norris as Ralph, Mary Kent as Widow Purelight, Jane Rogers as Annabella and Frances Maria Knight as Mrs Haughty, Jane Lucas as Malapert and Mary Powell as Mrs Rhenish.

== Bibliography ==
- Burling, William J. A Checklist of New Plays and Entertainments on the London Stage, 1700-1737. Fairleigh Dickinson Univ Press, 1992.
