= Tunbridge Walks =

1703 play

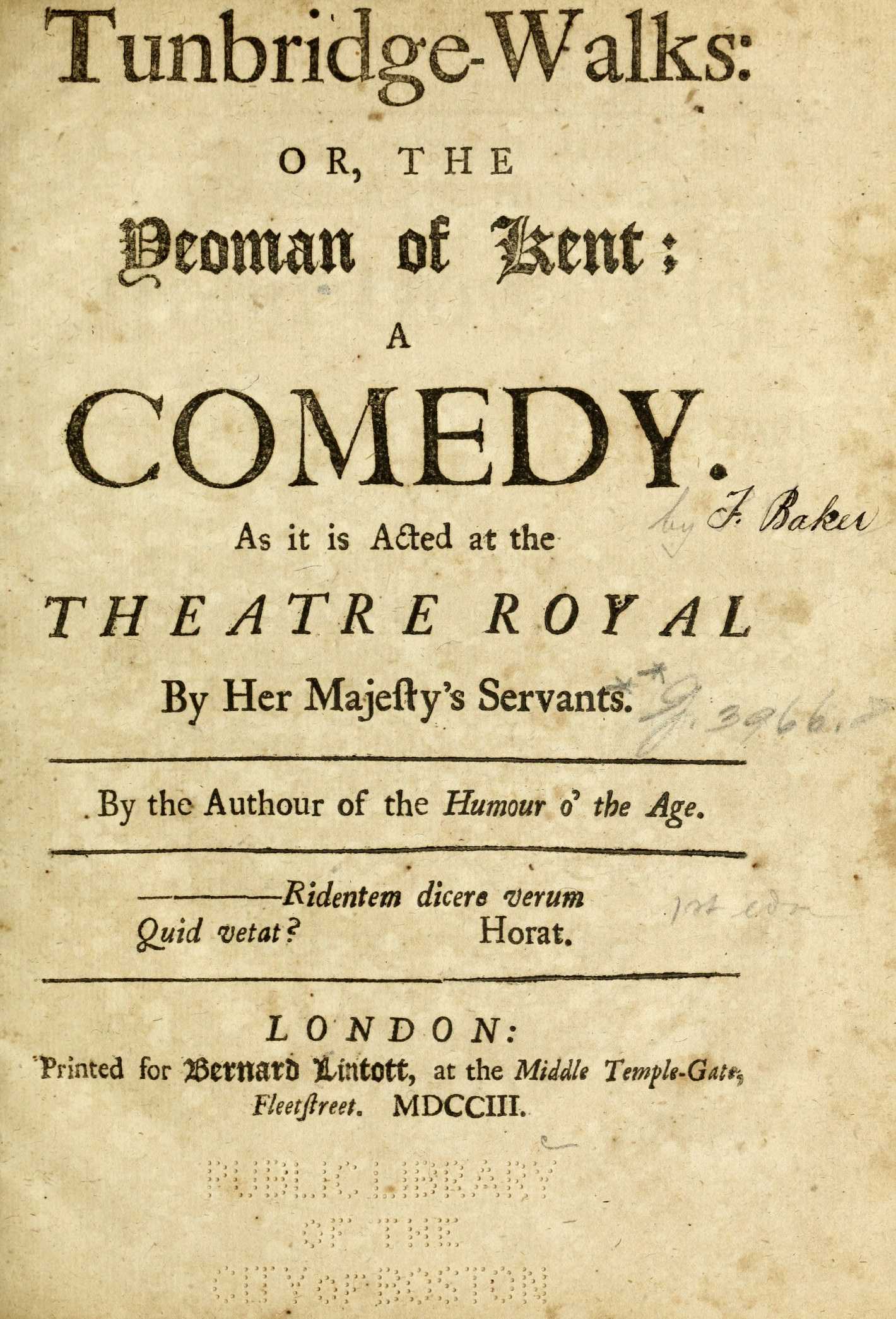
- Original language: English
- Written by: Thomas Baker
- Genre: Comedy
- Setting: Tunbridge Wells, Kent, present day

Premiere
- Date: 27 January 1703
- Place: Drury Lane Theatre

Tunbridge Walks, or the Yeoman of Kent is a 1703 comedy play by the English writer Thomas Baker. It starred the droll actor William Pinkethman in a leading role.

It was part of a growing trend of British plays set in spa towns. The play features the folk song King John and the Bishop. It was revived numerous times during the eighteenth century at Drury Lane, Covent Garden and Haymarket.

The original Drury Lane cast included John Mills as Loveworth, Robert Wilks as Reynard, Benjamin Johnson as Woodcock, William Pinkethman as Squib, William Bullock as Maiden, Jane Rogers as Belinda, Susanna Verbruggen as Hillaria, Mary Powell as Mrs Goodfellow, Henrietta Moore as Penelope and Jane Lucas as Lucy.

== Bibliography ==
- Burling, William J. A Checklist of New Plays and Entertainments on the London Stage, 1700-1737. Fairleigh Dickinson Univ Press, 1992.
- Orr, Bridget. British Enlightenment Theatre: Dramatizing Difference. Cambridge University Press, 2020.
