= Mary Powell (actress) =

English actress

Mary Powell (died 1723) was an English stage actress of the seventeenth century and early eighteenth century.

She was the wife of George Powell, and was generally billed as Mrs Powell. She was a long-standing member of the Drury Lane company. Her first recorded appearance there is in 1695, although she may have joined as early as 1686. She remained at Drury Lane until 1709.

== Selected roles ==
- Eudora in Neglected Virtue by Charles Hopkins (1696)
- Lady Blunder in The Younger Brother by Aphra Behn (1696)
- Mrs Vernish in The Sham Lawyer by James Drake (1697)
- Lady Manlove in Woman's Wit by Colley Cibber (1697)
- Bulfinch in Love and a Bottle by George Farquhar (1698)
- Anniky in The Campaigners by Thomas D'Urfey (1698)
- Lady Darling in The Constant Couple by George Farquhar (1701)
- Madame de Bourboun in The Unhappy Penitent by Catharine Trotter (1701)
- Donna Therasa in All for the Better by Francis Manning (1702)
- Mrs Goodfellow in Tunbridge Walks by Thomas Baker (1703)
- Mrs Rhenish in Vice Reclaimed by Richard Wilkinson (1703)

== Bibliography ==
- Highfill, Philip H, Burnim, Kalman A. & Langhans, Edward A. A Biographical Dictionary of Actors, Actresses, Musicians, Dancers, Managers, and Other Stage Personnel in London, 1660–1800: Pennell to Provost. SIU Press, 1987.
- Hughes, Derek. Eighteenth-century Women Playwrights: Mary Pix and Catherine Trotter. Pickering & Chatto, 2001.
