= The Confederacy (play) =

Play by John Vanbrugh

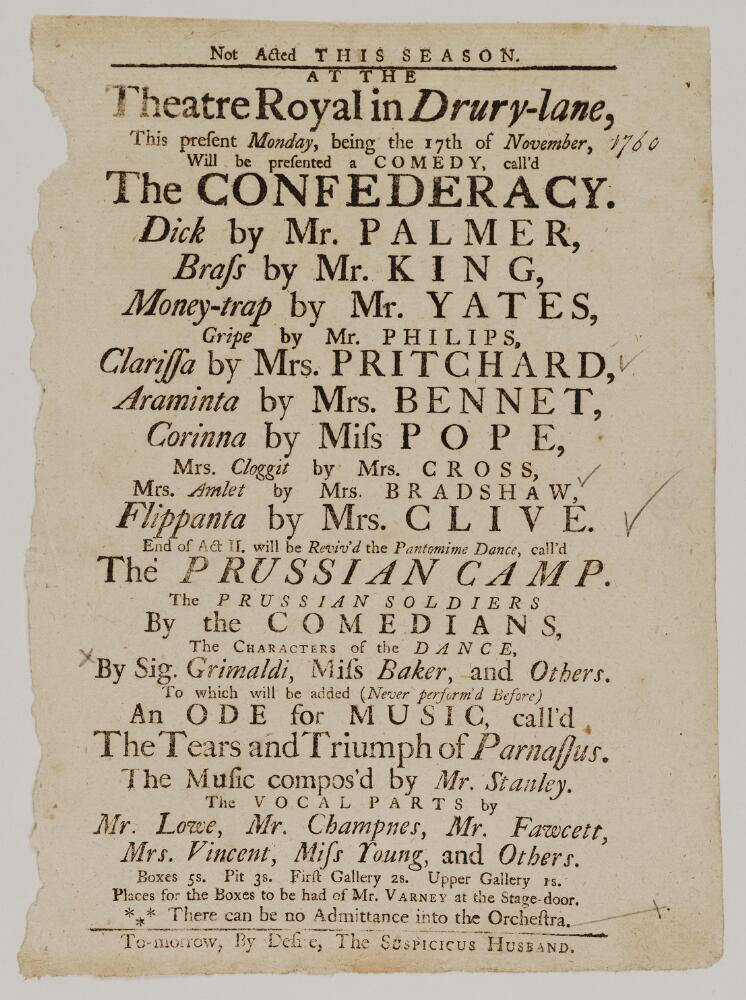
- Playbill for a 1760 performance
- Original language: English
- Written by: John Vanbrugh
- Genre: Comedy

Premiere
- Date: 30 October 1705
- Place: Queen's Theatre, Haymarket

The Confederacy is a 1705 comedy play by the English writer John Vanbrugh. It is also known as The City Wives' Confederacy. The plot was inspired by a 1692 farce by the French writer Florent Carton Dancourt. Two years before Vanbrugh's work, another writer, Richard Estcourt had produced another play, The Fair Example based on Dancourt's original.

It premiered at the Queen's Theatre, Haymarket with a cast that included Thomas Dogget as Moneytrap, Barton Booth as Dick, George Pack as Brass, Francis Leigh as Gripe, Elizabeth Barry as Clarissa, Mary Porter as Araminta, Anne Bracegirdle as Flippanta, Elizabeth Willis as Mrs Amlet and Katherine Baker as Mrs Cloggit.

Vanbrugh's play has been revived numerous times over the subsequent centuries.

== Bibliography ==
- Bevis, Richard W. English Drama: Restoration and Eighteenth Century 1660-1789. Routledge, 2014.
- Burling, William J. A Checklist of New Plays and Entertainments on the London Stage, 1700-1737. Fairleigh Dickinson Univ Press, 1992.
