= All for the Better =

1702 comedy play by Francis Manning

- Original language: English
- Written by: Francis Manning
- Genre: Comedy

Premiere
- Date: October 1702
- Place: Theatre Royal, Drury Lane, London

All for the Better is a 1702 comedy play by the English writer Francis Manning.

The original Drury Lane cast included Thomas Simpson as Mendez, Robert Wilks as Woodvil, John Mills as Johnson, Charles Fairbank as Young Mendez, John Bickerstaff as Antonio, Benjamin Husband as Alphonso, Benjamin Johnson as Lopez, Mary Powell as Donna Theresa, Jane Rogers as Isabella, Mary Kent as Daria, Henrietta Moore as Elvira, Jane Lucas as Clora and Henry Norris as Nurse. Jeremiah Clarke composed the incidental music for the play.

== Bibliography ==
- Burling, William J. A Checklist of New Plays and Entertainments on the London Stage, 1700-1737. Fairleigh Dickinson Univ Press, 1992.
- Lowerre, Kathryn. Music and Musicians on the London Stage, 1695-1705. Routledge, 2017.
