= The Lying Lover =

1703 play

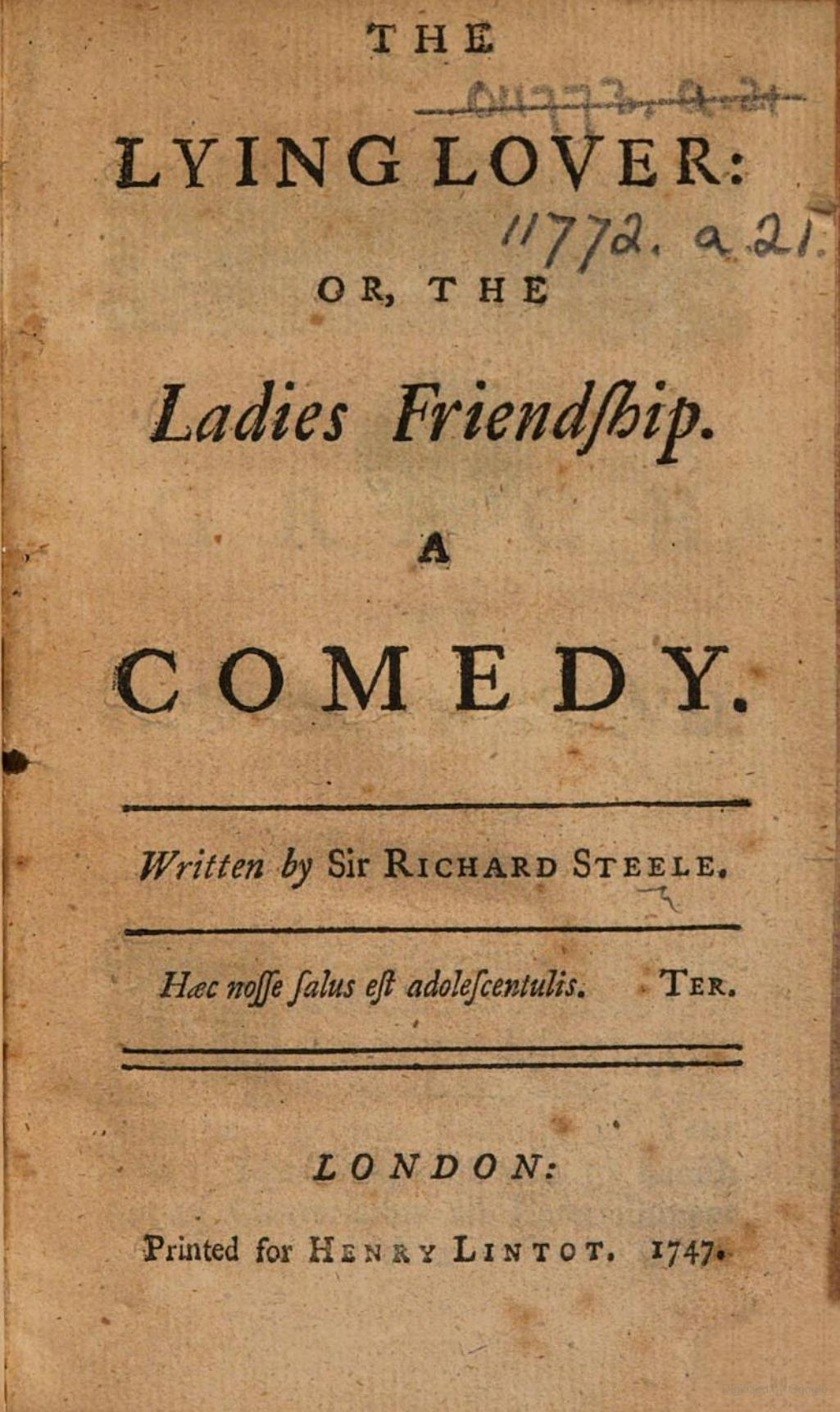
- Original language: English
- Written by: Richard Steele
- Genre: Restoration Comedy
- Setting: London, present day

Premiere
- Date: 2 December 1703
- Place: Theatre Royal, Drury Lane, London

The Lying Lover; Or, The Lady's Friendship is a 1703 comedy play by the Irish writer Richard Steele. It was his second play, written while he was an army office doing garrison duty in Harwich during the War of the Spanish Succession. It is described as being both a restoration comedy and a sentimental comedy, and marked the transition between the two.

It premiered at the Theatre Royal, Drury Lane in London. The original cast included Philip Griffin as Old Bookwit, Robert Wilks as Young Bookwit, John Mills as Lovemore, Colley Cibber as Latine, William Pinkethman as Storm, William Bullock as Charcoal, Jane Rogers as Penelope, Jane Lucas as Lettice, Susannah Cox as Betty and Anne Oldfield as Victoria. The published version was dedicated to the Duke of Ormonde, an Irish politician and soldier.

== Bibliography ==
- Burling, William J. A Checklist of New Plays and Entertainments on the London Stage, 1700-1737. Fairleigh Dickinson Univ Press, 1992.
- Van Lennep, W. The London Stage, 1660-1800: Volume Two, 1700-1729. Southern Illinois University Press, 1960.
