= Love's Contrivance =

1703 comedy play by Susanna Centlivre

- Original language: English
- Written by: Susanna Centlivre
- Genre: Comedy

Premiere
- Date: 4 June 1703
- Place: Theatre Royal, Drury Lane

Love's Contrivance is a 1703 comedy play by the English writer Susanna Centlivre. The cast featured Robert Wilks as Bellmie, Anne Oldfield as Belliza, William Bullock as Selfwill, Benjamin Johnson as Sir Toby Doubtful and Jane Rogers as Lucinda.

It was staged at Drury Lane Theatre and ran for five nights, which was considered a moderate success eclipsing Centlivre play's previous play The Stolen Heiress.

== Bibliography ==
- Burling, William J. A Checklist of New Plays and Entertainments on the London Stage, 1700-1737. Fairleigh Dickinson Univ Press, 1992.
- Heard, Elisabeth J. Experimentation on the English Stage, 1695-1708: The Career of George Farquhar. Routledge, 2015.
