= The Humour of the Age =

1701 play

- Original language: English
- Written by: Thomas Baker
- Genre: Comedy

Premiere
- Date: March 1701
- Place: Drury Lane Theatre

The Humour of the Age is a 1701 comedy play by the English writer Thomas Baker. It was staged at the Theatre Royal in Drury Lane.

== Bibliography ==
- Burling, William J. A Checklist of New Plays and Entertainments on the London Stage, 1700-1737. Fairleigh Dickinson Univ Press, 1992.
- Gill, Catie. Theatre and Culture in Early Modern England, 1650-1737: From Leviathan to Licensing Act. Ashgate Publishing, 2013.
- Turner, David M. Fashioning Adultery: Gender, Sex and Civility in England, 1660–1740. Cambridge University Press, 2002.
