= The Careless Husband =

1704 play

- Original language: English
- Written by: Colley Cibber
- Genre: Restoration Comedy

Premiere
- Date: 7 December 1704
- Place: Theatre Royal, Drury Lane, London

The Carless Husband is a comedy play by the English writer Colley Cibber. It premiered at the Theatre Royal, Drury Lane on 7 December 1704. The original cast featured Cibber as Lord Foppington, George Powell as Lord Morelove, Robert Wilks as Sir Charles Easy, Anne Oldfield as Lady Betty Modish, Frances Maria Knight as Lady Easy, Henrietta Moore as Lady Graveairs and Jane Lucas as Mrs Edging. It has been described as Cibber's most successful play, and provided a vehicle for his popular foppish Lord Foppington personae.

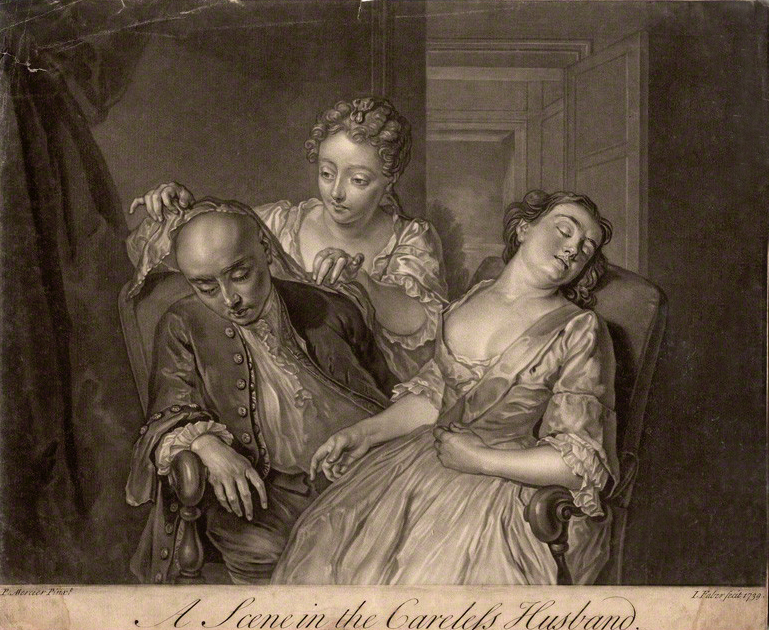
Kitty Clive as Lady Easy in 1739.

== Bibliography ==
- Frank, Marcie. The Novel Stage: Narrative Form from the Restoration to Jane Austen. Rutgers University Press, 2020.
- McGirr, Elaine M. Partial Histories: A Reappraisal of Colley Cibber. Springer, 2016.
- Van Lennep, W. The London Stage, 1660-1800: Volume Two, 1700-1729. Southern Illinois University Press, 1960.
