= The Artifice (play) =

Play by Susanna Centlivre

- Original language: English
- Written by: Susanna Centlivre
- Genre: Restoration comedy

Premiere
- Date: 2 October 1722
- Place: Theatre Royal, Drury Lane

The Artifice is a 1722 comedy by the British writer Susanna Centlivre, first published in 1723. It was her final play, returning to the more robust style of restoration comedy which was very uncommon by this era.

Staged at the Drury Lane Theatre the cast included Robert Wilks as Sir John Freeman, Anne Oldfield as Mrs Watchit, William Wilks as Fainwell, John Mills as Ned Freeman, Benjamin Griffin as Watchit, John Harper as Tally, Christiana Horton as Olivia, Elizabeth Younger as Louisa.

== Bibliography ==
- Burling, William J. A Checklist of New Plays and Entertainments on the London Stage, 1700-1737. Fairleigh Dickinson Univ Press, 1992.
- Rubik, Margarete. Early Women Dramatists 1550–1801. Macmillan, 2016.
