= Anne Oldfield =

English actress (1683–1730)

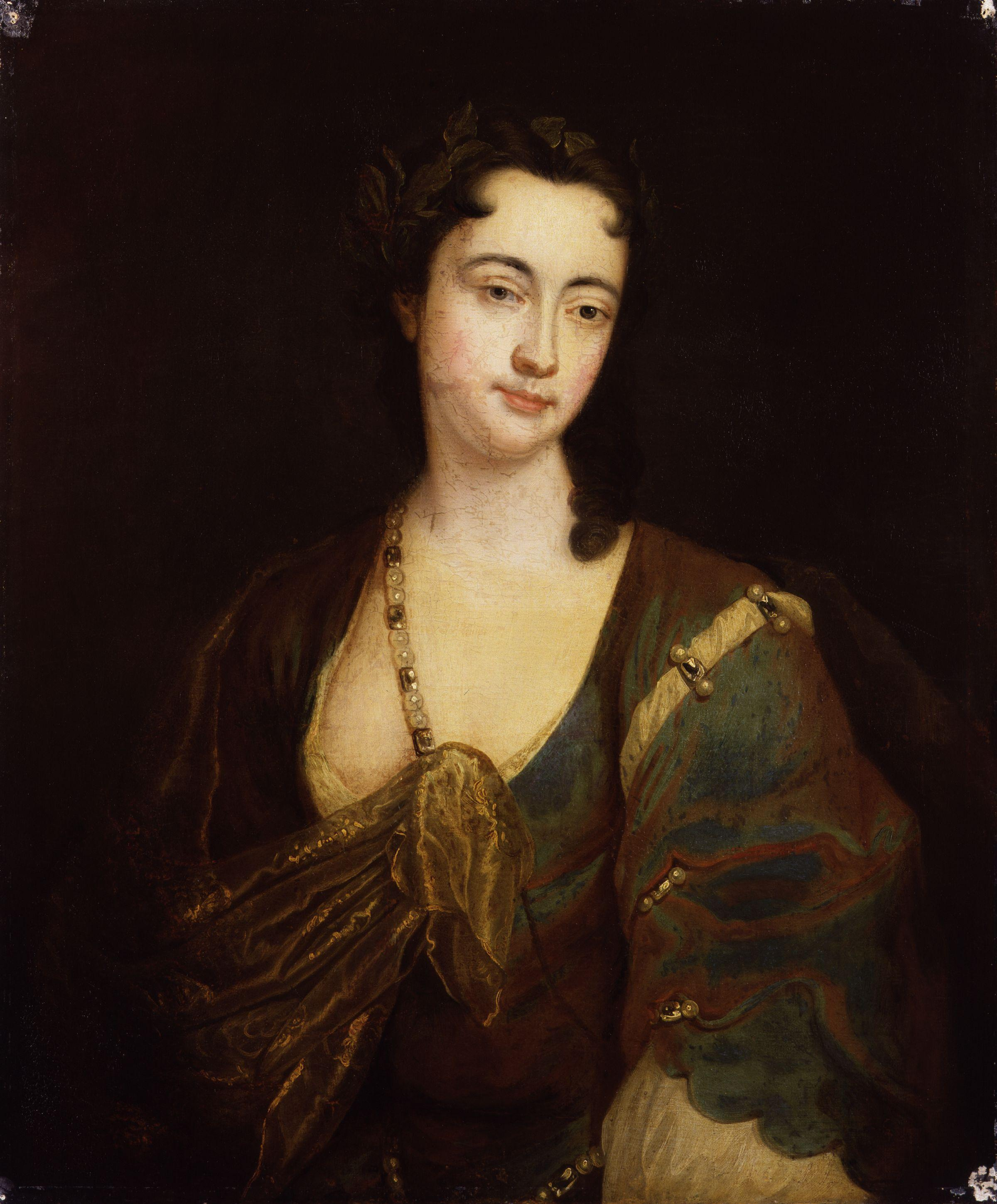
- Portrait of Oldfield, National Portrait Gallery (artist unknown)
- Born: 1683; London, England
- Died: 23 October 1730 (aged 47); Grosvenor Street, London, England
- Burial place: Westminster Abbey
- Occupation: Actress
- Partner(s): Arthur Maynwaring; Charles Churchill
- Children: Arthur Maynwaring; Charles Churchill
- Father: James Oldfield

Anne Oldfield (1683 – 23 October 1730) was an English actress and one of the highest paid actresses of her time.

== Early life and discovery ==
She was born in London in 1683. Her father was a soldier, James Oldfield. Her mother was either Anne or Elizabeth Blanchard. Her grandfather owned a tavern and left her father several properties, he however mortgaged these which resulted in Anne and her mother being placed in financial difficulty when he died young. It appears that Oldfield received some education because her biographers state that she read widely in her youth. Oldfield and her mother went to live with her aunt, Mrs Voss, in the Mitre tavern, St James. In 1699, she attracted George Farquhar's attention when he overheard her reciting lines from Francis Beaumont and John Fletcher's play The Scornful Lady (1616) in a back room of her tavern. Soon after, she was hired by Christopher Rich to join the cast of the Theatre Royal, Drury Lane.

== Career ==
A year later she was cast in her first small role as Candiope in John Dryden's Secret Love; or, The Maiden Queen (1699). After her success in a minor role, she was given the lead in John Fletcher's The Pilgrim (1647). In the summer of 1703, Oldfield replaced Susanna Verbruggen when her contract was terminated before the company travelled to Bath to perform for Queen Anne and her court.

Oldfield became one of Drury Lane's leading actresses. Colley Cibber acknowledged that she had as much as he to do with the success of his The Careless Husband (1704), in which she created the part of Lady Modish. Speaking of her portrayal of Lady Townly in his The Provoked Husband (1728), Cibber was to say, "that here she outdid her usual Outdoing". She also played the title role in Ben Jonson's Epicoene, and Celia in his Volpone.

Contemporary gossip is recorded that there were rivalries between Oldfield, Anne Bracegirdle, Jane Rogers and Susannah Centlivre, all of whom were supposedly vying for the best roles. In 1706 Oldfield came into conflict with the Drury Lane's management over benefits and salary she believed she had been promised, but which the theatre refused to pay. Oldfield left and joined the competing acting company at Haymarket Theatre before returning to Drury Lane shortly after with a fresh contract and a new position as joint-sharer of the Drury Lane Theatre. On a separate occasion, Oldfield was offered to become manager of the Theatre, "but her sex was thought to be an objection to that measure" thus being asked to name her own terms to stay in her old position, Oldfield received 200 guineas salary, which was ultimately raised to 500 guineas resulting in Oldfield becoming the highest paid actress of her time.

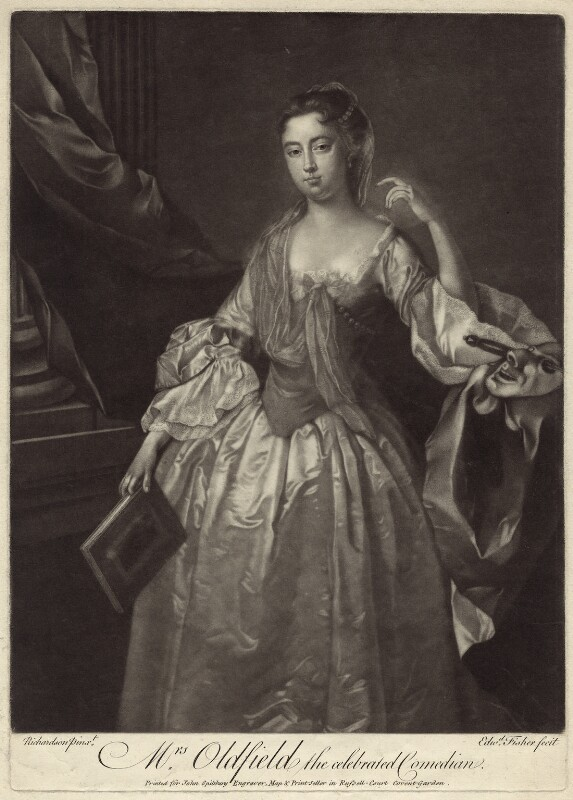
Anne Oldfield at the Covent Gardens.Edward Fisher, after Jonathan Richardson mezzotint, circa 1760–1785,

== Personal life ==
Oldfield began a decade-long relationship with Whig politician Arthur Maynwaring around 1700. Owing to her success, Oldfield remained financially independent from Maynwaring. He supported her career by helping her work through new roles and by writing more than a dozen prologues and epilogues for her to perform. When she became pregnant with their son, Arthur. Oldfield kept acting until she was physically unable, which was unusual for the time. She went back to work just three months after the birth. Oldfield arranged for her lifelong friend, Margaret Saunders, to join the acting profession.

When Maynwaring died in 1712, rumours circulated that he had died from a venereal disease that Oldfield had given to him. In order to clear both their names, she ordered an official autopsy to be performed on his body, which revealed that he had died of tuberculosis. Oldfield was three months pregnant at the time, but her child is not believed to have survived the birth.

Several years after Maynwaring's death, Oldfield began a relationship with Charles Churchill. The two lived together for many years and had a son, Charles. However, during this pregnancy, Oldfield was unable to continue acting due to her health, and was forced to leave the theatre for several months. She never fully recovered her health.

Throughout her last theatrical season she suffered from chronic pain in her abdomen. She retired from the stage in April 1730 and died from cancer of the uterus a few months later.

Oldfield died on 23 October 1730 at age 47, at 60 Grosvenor Street, London. She divided her property between her two sons. Oldfield was buried in Westminster Abbey, beneath the monument to Congreve. Her partner, Churchill, applied for permission to erect a monument there to her memory, but the dean of Westminster refused it.

== Memorial ==
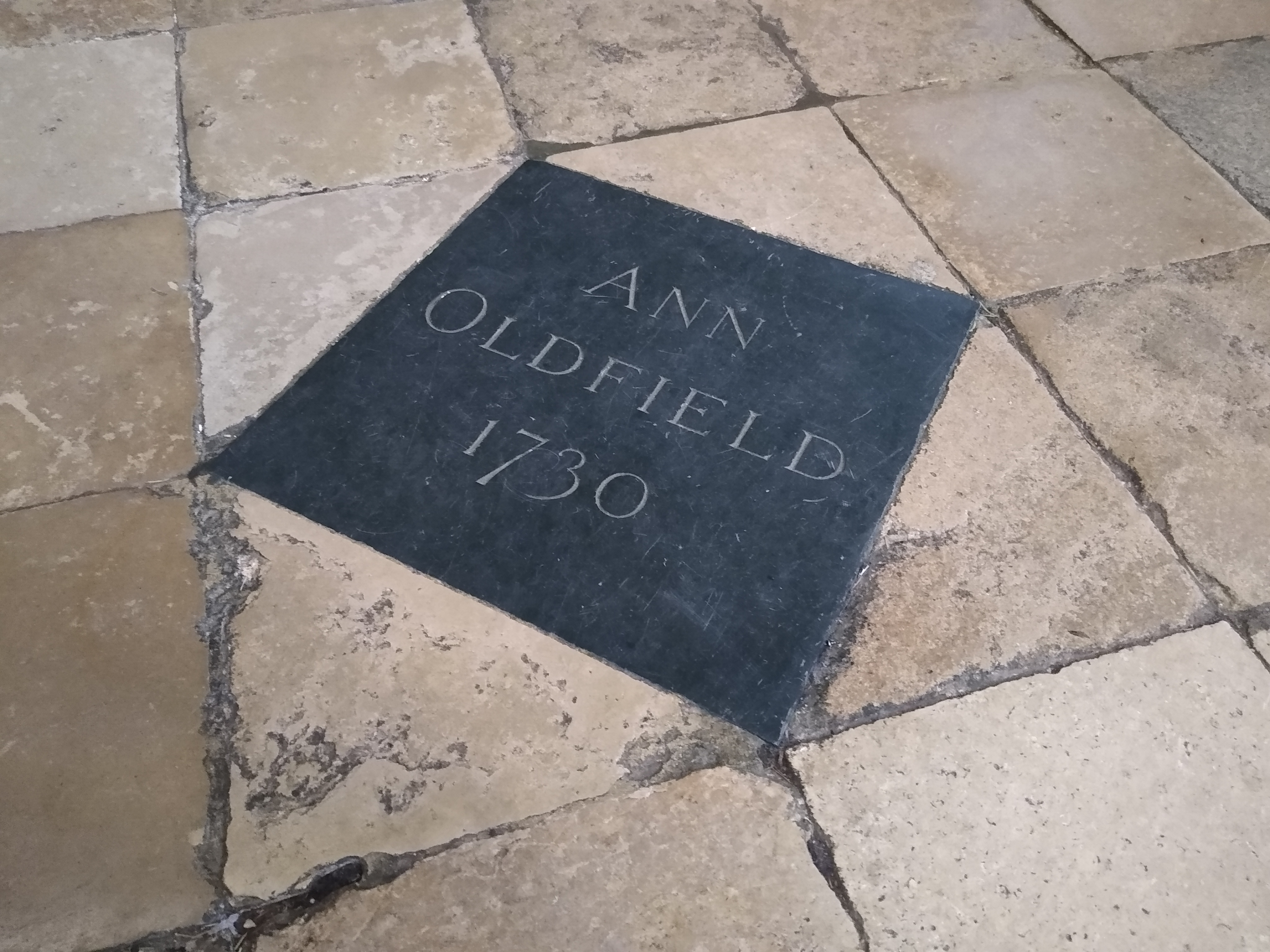
Resting place in Westminster Abbey

Alexander Pope, in his Sober Advice from Horace, wrote of her "Engaging Oldfield, who, with grace and ease, Could join the arts to ruin and to please." Oldfield had said to her maid "No, let a charming chintz and Brussels lace Wrap my cold limbs and shade my lifeless face; One would not, sure, be frightful when one's dead, And Betty give this cheek a little red."

== Significant roles ==
- 1699, Candiope – The Maiden Queen by John Dryden.
- 1700, Alinda - The Pilgrim by John Fletcher.
- 1701, Anne – The Unhappy Penitent by Catharine Trotter
- 1701, Cimene – The Generous Conqueror by Bevil Higgons
- 1701, Helen – The Virgin Prophetess by Elkanah Settle
- 1702, Camilla – The Modish Husband by William Burnaby
- 1702, Jacinta – The False Friend by John Vanbrugh
- 1703, Lucia – The Fair Example by Richard Estcourt
- 1703, Victoria – The Lying Lover by Richard Steele
- 1703, Belliza – Love's Contrivance by Susanna Centlivre
- 1703, Lucia – The Old Mode and the New by Thomas d'Urfey
- 1704, Lady Modish – The Careless Husband by Colley Cibber.
- 1705, Arabella – Hampstead Heath by Thomas Baker
- 1706, Silvia – The Recruiting Officer by George Farquhar
- 1706, Celia – Volpone by Ben Jonson.
- 1706, Isabella – The Platonick Lady by Susanna Centlivre
- 1707, Lady Dainty – The Double Gallant by Colley Cibber
- 1707, Ethelinda – The Royal Convert by Nicholas Rowe
- 1707, A Silent Woman – Epiocene by Ben Jonson.
- 1707, Florimel - Marriage A La Mode by John Dryden.
- 1708, Lady Rodomont – The Fine Lady's Airs by Thomas Baker
- 1708, Semandra – Mithridates, King of Pontus by Nathaniel Lee
- 1709, Rutland – The Unhappy Favourite by John Banks.
- 1709, Leonara – Sir Courtly Nice by John Crowne.
- 1709, Carolina -Epsom Wells by Thomas Shadwell.
- 1709, Elvira – The Spanish Fryer, or The Double Discovery by unknown.
- 1709, Narcissa – Love's Last Shift by Colley Cibber.
- 1709, Luncinda – The Rival Fools by Colley Cibber
- 1709, Maria – The Fortune Hunters, or Two Fools Well Met by James Carlile.
- 1709, Lady Lurewell – The Constant Couple, or A Trip to the Jubilee by George Farquhar.
- 1709, Hellena – The Rover, or The Banish'd Cavilier by Aphra Behn.
- 1709, Estifania – Rule A Wife and Have A Wife by John Fletcher.
- 1709, Mrs Sullen -The Beaux' Stratagem by George Farquhar.
- 1709, Widow- Wit Without Money by John Fletcher.
- 1709, Wanton Wife – The Wanton Wife by Thomas Betterton.
- 1709, Constantina- The Chances by John Fletcher.
- 1709, Belinda – The Man's Bewitched by Susanna Centlivre.
- 1711, Arabella – The Wife's Relief by Charles Johnson
- 1712, Andromache – Distrest Mother by Ambrose Philips.
- 1713, Marcia - Cato by Joseph Addison.
- 1714, Eriphile – The Victim by Charles Johnson
- 1714, Jane Shore – Jane Shore by Nicholas Rowe
- 1715, Lady Jane Grey – Lady Jane Grey by Nicholas Rowe
- 1716, Lady Trueman – The Drummer by Joseph Addison
- 1716, Leonora – The Cruel Gift by Susanna Centlivre
- 1717, Atalida – The Sultaness by Charles Johnson
- 1717, Maria – The Non-Juror by Colley Cibber
- 1717, Rosalinda – Lucius by Delarivier Manley
- 1717, Mrs Townley – Three Hours After Marriage by John Gay
- 1719, Celona – The Spartan Dame by Thomas Southerne
- 1719, Sophronia – The Masquerade by Charles Johnson
- 1719, Mandane – Busiris, King of Egypt by Edward Young
- 1721, Sophronia – The Refusal by Colley Cibber
- 1722, Mrs Watchit – The Artifice by Susanna Centlivre
- 1722, Indiana – The Conscious Lovers by Richard Steele
- 1723, Margaret – Humphrey, Duke of Gloucester by Ambrose Philips
- 1724, Cylene – The Captives by John Gay
- 1724, Cleopatra – Caesar in Egypt by Colley Cibber
- 1727, Amoret – The Rival Modes by James Moore Smythe
- 1728, Lady Townly – The Provoked Husband by Colley Cibber]
- 1728, Lady Matchless – Love in Several Masques by Henry Fielding
- 1730, Clarinda – The Humours of Oxford by James Miller
- 1730, Sophonisba in Sophonisba by James Thomson
