= The Victim (play) =

1714 tragedy by British writer Charles Johnson

- Original language: English
- Written by: Charles Johnson
- Genre: Tragedy

Premiere
- Date: 5 January 1714
- Place: Drury Lane Theatre

The Victim is a 1714 tragedy by the British writer Charles Johnson.

The original Drury Lane cast included Robert Wilks as Agamemnon, Barton Booth as Achilles, Theophilus Keene as Ulysses, John Mills as Menelaus, Lacy Ryan as Arcas, Christopher Bullock as Euribartes, Frances Maria Knight as Clytemnestra, Mary Porter as Iphigenia and Anne Oldfield as Eriphile. The epilogue was written by Colley Cibber.

== Bibliography ==
- Burling, William J. A Checklist of New Plays and Entertainments on the London Stage, 1700-1737. Fairleigh Dickinson Univ Press, 1992.
