= The Faithful Bride of Granada =

1704 play by William Taverner

- Original language: English
- Written by: William Taverner
- Genre: Tragedy

Premiere
- Date: May 1704
- Place: Theatre Royal, Drury Lane, London

The Faithful Bride of Granada is a 1704 tragedy by the English writer William Taverner. It was the only tragedy by Tarverner, better known for his comedies.

The original cast included John Mills as Abdolin, Robert Wilks as Abinomin, Philip Griffin as Osmin, Benjamin Husband as Albovade, Jane Rogers as Zelinda, Frances Maria Knight as Abenede and Mary Kent as Zaida.

== Bibliography ==
- Burling, William J. A Checklist of New Plays and Entertainments on the London Stage, 1700-1737. Fairleigh Dickinson Univ Press, 1992.
- Nicoll, Allardyce. History of English Drama, 1660-1900, Volume 2. Cambridge University Press, 2009.
