= Sir Harry Wildair =

1701 play

- Written by: George Farquhar
- Original language: English
- Genre: Restoration Comedy

Premiere
- Date premiered: April 1701
- Place premiered: Drury Lane Theatre

Sir Harry Wildair is a 1701 comic play by the Irish writer George Farquhar. It is a sequel to the 1699 hit The Constant Couple, portraying the further adventures of the most popular character from the earlier play.

The original Drury Lane cast included Robert Wilks as Sir Harry Wildair, John Mills as Colonel Standard, Benjamin Johnson as Captain Fireball, Colley Cibber as Marquis, William Pinkethman as Clincher, Henry Norris as Dicky, Henry Fairbank as Shark, Thomas Simpson as Lord Bellamy, Susanna Verbruggen as Lady Lurewell, Jane Rogers as Angelica and Jane Lucas as Parly. Farquhar, an Irish Protestant from Derry, dedicated the play to William of Orange.

== Bibliography ==
- Bevis, Richard W. English Drama: Restoration and Eighteenth Century 1660-1789. Routledge, 2014.
- Morash, Christopher. A History of Irish Theatre 1601-2000. Cambridge University Press, 2002.
