= The Inconstant =

- Original language: English
- Written by: George Farquhar
- Genre: Comedy

Premiere
- Date: February 1702; 324 years ago
- Place: Drury Lane Theatre

The Inconstant, or the Way to Win Him is a 1702 play by the Irish writer George Farquhar. It was a reworking of the Jacobean comedy The Wild Goose Chase by John Fletcher. A success, the play was revived a number of times during the eighteenth and nineteenth centuries.

Despite its popularity, the play was later criticised for its similarities to Fletcher's earlier work with Leigh Hunt commenting it was "neither more or less Fletcher's play, with the poetry taken out".

== Bibliography ==
- Moore, Helen. Amadis in English: A Study in the Reading of Romance. Oxford University Press, 2020.
