= The Beaux' Stratagem =

1707 play by George Farquhar

The Beaux' Stratagem is a comedy by George Farquhar, first produced at the Theatre Royal, now the site of Her Majesty's Theatre, in the Haymarket, London, on 8 March 1707. In the play, Archer and Aimwell, two young gentlemen who have fallen on hard times, plan to travel through small towns, until one can marry a wealthy heiress. In the first town, Lichfield, they set their sights on Dorinda. Aimwell falls truly in love, and comedy ensues. Foigard, a priest and chaplain to the French officer, is actually an Irish priest called MacShane (a sombre version of the stage-Irish stereotype).

== Characters ==
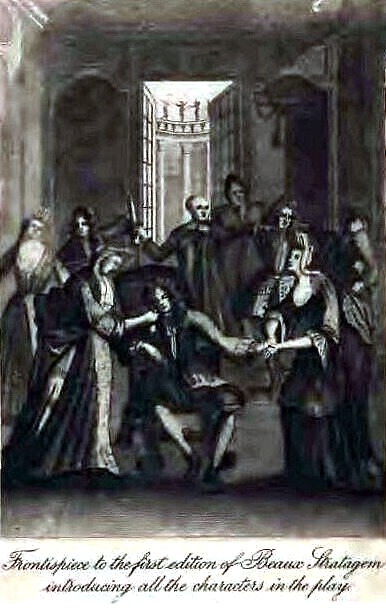
Frontispiece of the first edition of The Beaux' Stratagem, which introduces the characters

- Archer, a beau, posing as servant to Aimwell
- Aimwell, another beau
- Count Bellair, a French count
- Boniface, a Landlord of an inn (Note: Hence "Boniface", an expression for "mine host", an hotelier.)
- Cherry, his daughter
- Lady Bountiful, country woman, specialises in herbal medicine
- Dorinda, her daughter
- A countrywoman
- Squire Sullen, a country block-head, Lady Bountiful's son
- Scrub, his servant
- Mrs (Kate) Sullen, his unhappy wife, Lady Bountiful's daughter-in-law
- Gipsy, her servant
- Foigard, a priest and chaplain to the French officers
- Gibbet, a highwayman
- Hounslow, his associate
- Bagshot, another associate
- Sir Charles Freeman, brother to Mrs. Sullen

== Summary ==
Aimwell and Archer are two fashionable beaux, on the lookout for an heiress to marry so they can repair their fortunes. To help their scheme, Archer poses as Aimwell's servant when they arrive in the city of Lichfield. Aimwell insinuates himself into friendship with the beautiful Dorinda, daughter of Lady Bountiful. Meanwhile, Archer strikes up an extremely worldly friendship with Kate, Dorinda's sister-in-law. She is unhappily married to Sullen, a parody of a country squire, mad for hunting and eating and (especially) drinking.

Obstacles to a happy ending include the fact that Kate's husband despises her; that the innkeeper's saucy daughter, Cherry, has fallen in love with Archer; that Lady Bountiful, who is extremely over-protective of Dorinda's virtue, mistakenly believes herself to be a great healer of the sick, while a band of brigands plans to rob Lady Bountiful that very night.

== Plot ==
In London in the early eighteenth century, two young gentlemen, Aimwell and Archer, their money spent and their only alternatives being to marry money or to sell their swords for the wars, conceal their poverty from their gay London friends, and ride into the country to let fate decide their course for them. They are still in possession of their last two hundred pounds, and they have make a plan, by turns one is to play the fine lord, the other his servant, the better to impress the country folk.

They arrive at Lichfield Inn, and Aimwell, taking the first turn at playing the lord, drinks with the garrulous Will Boniface, the innkeeper, to learn of the prospects in the vicinity. The countryside's most notable household, he finds, is that of Lady Bountiful, a wealthy widow whose philanthropy and skill as a healer have made her an idolised figure. She has a young, wealthy and lovely daughter called Dorinda, and a sluggard son, Squire Sullen, who has recently married a comely London lady. Also at the inn are some captive French officers, among them Count Bellair and Foigard, their priest.

Aimwell, to strengthen the impression of his high estate, puts his money in the landlord's strongbox, bidding Boniface to keep it in readiness as he may stay at the inn only a half hour. Boniface, himself in league with the highwaymen, Gibbet, Hounslow and Bagshot, suspects that Aimwell and Archer are thieves, and, to betray them and get their money, he tells his pretty daughter, Cherry, to tease what information she can from Archer while he plies Aimwell with drink and subtle questioning. But Boniface is outwitted by Aimwell who reveals nothing, and Cherry only succeeds in falling in love with Archer.

Dorinda and her sister-in-law, Mrs. Sullen, are also curious about the travellers, for Aimwell has gone to church to meet the rich Dorinda. Dorinda immediately becomes deeply interested in the handsome stranger. She and Mrs. Sullen induce Scrub, servant to the Sullens, to invite Archer (still playing Aimwell's servant) to their home for questioning. They too are checkmated in their attempt to get information, but the discontented Mrs. Sullen observes that Archer is not without charm.

When Archer has gone, Mrs. Sullen and Dorinda carry out a ruse to awaken Sullen, who has been derelict in this respect, to his duties as a loving husband. Dorinda has concealed Sullen in a closet in order that he may hear Count Bellair woo his wife and she ridicule her husband. Sullen reacts by rushing out with a drawn sword, but is restrained from attacking Bellair by a pistol levelled at him by his wife. He scores a point, however, when he observes that he does not care if his wife bestows her favours elsewhere if she does so secretly and not to a Frenchman – he detests all Frenchmen. Bellair, whom Mrs. Sullen now informs, with some exaggeration, that her passion has been only feigned, notes that her virtue may be very great but her honesty very little, and invites her to send for him whenever she needs a fool. All in all, the stratagem has not done well, but Mrs. Sullen is still in a reckless mood.

A diversion is created when Archer appears, simulating great concern, to report that his master is outside, suffering from a fit, and he implores the good offices of Lady Bountiful. Aimwell, feigning coma, is borne in, but quickly regains consciousness after violently squeezing the comforting hand of the beautiful Dorinda. When Archer suggests that Aimwell should not yet venture into the open air, Dorinda and her sister-in-law escort the men on a tour of the house. Aimwell and Dorinda stray off by themselves, and only a determined effort of conscience saves Mrs. Sullen from a lapse from virtue when the industrious Archer entices her into her own bedchamber.

As Archer leaves, Scrub tells him that he has overheard Foigard, the priest, bribing Gipsy, the Sullens' maid, to conceal Bellair in Mrs. Sullen's chamber that night. Mrs. Sullen now wonders if, without supernatural gifts, she can do more than simply avoid the temptation of Archer, and Dorinda dreams of marrying "Lord" Aimwell and living a gay life in London. Archer and Aimwell, meanwhile, confront Foigard with a trumped-up charge of treason, and, in exchange for their silence, win the priest's promise that he will conduct Archer, instead of the Count, to Mrs. Sullen's bedroom.

Other developments are in the making for the household that same night. Boniface has arranged that Gibbet, Hounslow and Bagshot, armed to the teeth, shall rob Lady Bountiful. Gibbet has already got Sullen tipsy with drink by way of preparation. Sir Charles Freeman, brother of Mrs. Sullen, whom she has summoned to help her get free of her obnoxious husband, now arrives at the inn. Freeman and Sullen, the latter unaware that he is talking with his brother-in-law, fall into conversation. Sullen becomes indignant when Freeman suggests that he should not go home to his wife in his drunken condition. "What!" he exclaims, "not lie with my wife! Sir, do you take me for an atheist or a rake? I'm a justice of the peace, and must do nothing against the law." Since Freeman takes her part, he makes a drunken promise that Freeman shall have his wife in the morning, with a venison pasty to boot.

At two o'clock the next morning, Cherry, unable to find Archer, who by this time is concealed in Mrs. Sullen's closet, runs to Aimwell with the news that the robbers are leaving for Lady Bountiful's home. Mrs. Sullen, sighing languorously, is entertaining disturbing thoughts of Archer: "...Suppose him here, dressed like a youthful, gay and burning bridegroom, with tongue enchanting, eyes bewitching, knees imploring..." She shrieks as she sees Archer, who steals forth from his closet hiding-place and faithfully acts out her fantasy. Again, Mrs. Sullen's conscience comes reluctantly to the rescue, and she is summoning resolution enough to scream when Scrub rushes in with word that the robbers are in the house.

Archer, drawing his sword, hides as Gibbet enters to plunder, then springs upon the bandit and subdues him, summoning Foigard, who is hiding in Gipsy's chamber, to bind the fellow. Meanwhile, Aimwell has arrived and has engaged in combat both Hounslow and Bagshot, who are robbing Lady Bountiful and Dorinda. Archer and Mrs. Sullen appear, and soon the bandits are disarmed. Archer, slightly wounded, contrives that Mrs. Sullen show him to a bed-chamber, but this time she is saved by a servant announcing the arrival of Freeman, her brother. It so happens that Freeman is an acquaintance of both Archer and Aimwell. Archer fears that the masquerade will now be spoiled just at the very moment of its almost certain success, for Aimwell is about to propose to Dorinda while she, grateful for her rescue, is sure to be in a softened mood. Aimwell proposes, but under the compunction of his sincere love for Dorinda, confesses that he is a fraud, falsely bearing his brother's title.

Dorinda accepts Aimwell for himself, then hears some good news. As she and Aimwell are about to be married, she tells him that his brother has died and that he has therefore succeeded to his title and estate. Freeman verifies this report and all are happy, Aimwell with his bride and Archer with Dorinda's ample fortune which Aimwell gives to him.

Bellair arrives to tell them that the inn has also been robbed and Cherry sends to Archer a note disclosing that her father, fearing betrayal by the bandits, has fled. She sends the strongbox, as well as her love, to Archer. The company agrees to seek a pardon for Boniface and to accept Cherry in the service of the Aimwells.

There remains only one problem – the freeing of Mrs. Sullen and her fortune from her husband. This is contrived by Archer, who has recovered from Gibbet all the papers of her estate and, with the consent of Sullen, whose headache from the night before has left him wanting "only a dram", Archer and Mrs. Sullen lead a final dance, joined by everybody but Sullen.

== Analysis ==
Aimwell and Dorinda become engaged to be married at the end of the play, in accordance with the rules of the genre, in which young lovers always get married in the end. However, Farquhar uses Kate Sullen to criticise this facile outcome. She, originally rich in her own right, is trapped in a loveless marriage to a man she despises, who keeps her from the town-based society she adores. The legal system does not allow divorce based on incompatibility, and any divorce at the time left women disgraced and penniless. The dark side to the play produced by this theme threatens to overwhelm the rest of it, and Farquhar has to resort to a deus ex machina character and an arbitrary adjustment to English law to get out of the hole he has dug for himself. Noticeably, even when Kate's separation from her husband seems an accomplished fact, the possibility of marriage never seems to cross either her or Archer's mind.

The Beaux' Stratagem is one of the last Restoration comedies, before the genre was replaced by a new style of more genteel comedy. In a few years, The Beaux' Stratagem would be considered somewhat immoral, notably Farquhar's cynicism about the charms of matrimony.

== Adaptations ==
The Beaux' Stratagem has been adapted by Thornton Wilder and Ken Ludwig. Wilder began his adaptation in 1939 but never finished it. In the summer of 2004, Wilder's estate asked Ludwig to complete the adaptation. The resulting play had its world première production in November 2006 at The Shakespeare Theatre Company of Washington, D.C., directed by Michael Kahn. In this version, Count Bellair and Gibbet are removed and replaced by Gloss, a highwayman disguised as a priest.

A Ladies' response to the play named The Belle's Stratagem was written by Hannah Cowley in 1780, and remained in the Covent Garden repertoire for the next two decades. This was adapted and directed in February 2018, by Scottish actor and director Tony Cownie in a production for the Royal Lyceum Theatre, Edinburgh.

== Notable productions ==
- John Street Theatre, 1767: The debut play at the first permanent playhouse in New York City
- Chichester Festival Theatre 1967: Fenella Fielding, Bill Fraser, Maureen O'Brien, Anton Rodgers, Prunella Scales, John Standing, Margaret Courtenay. Directed by William Chappell
- National Theatre Company at the Old Vic 1970: Robert Stephens as Archer; Maggie Smith as Mrs Sullen, with Derek Jacobi as Boniface and Sheila Reid as Dorinda.
- Royal National Theatre 1989: Stephen Dillane (spelt Dillon on the poster) as Archer; Marc Sinden and Brenda Blethyn as Squire and Mrs Sullen, with Harold Innocent as Boniface and Jane Gurnett as Dorinda.
- The Stratford Festival of Ontario, Canada staged The Beaux' Stratagem as part of its 2014 season.
- National Theatre Olivier Theatre 2015: Samuel Barnett as Aimwell, Geoffrey Streatfeild as Archer, Jane Booker as Lady Bountiful, Pippa Bennett-Warner as Dorinda and Susannah Fielding as Mrs Sullen.
- University of Galway 2025: The Irish premiere of Ludwig's and Wilder's production, performed by BA Drama Theatre and Performance Studies students at the O'Donoghue Centre for Drama, Theatre and Performance, Galway.
