= Thomas Baker (dramatist) =

English dramatist and lawyer (1680–1749)

Thomas Baker (c. 1680 – 1749) was an English dramatist and lawyer.

== Life ==
Baker is said to have been the son of an eminent attorney of London, and is said to have been educated in Oxford.

A disparaging estimate of his character and his powers is furnished in the List of Dramatic Authors with some Account of their Lives, attributed to John Mottley (the compiler of Joe Miller's Jests), which appears at the close of Thomas Whincop's tragedy of Scanderbeg. According to this rather prejudiced authority, Baker 'was under disgrace' with his father, 'who allowed him a very scanty income,' and was compelled to retire into Worcestershire, where he lived as a schoolmaster and vicar until his death in 1749. His successor at Bolnhurst, John Jones, remarked in private papers that he was "A man of strange turn, imperious and clamorous upon topics of no service towards the promoting of true religion in his parish, and not a little addicted to stiff and dividing principles". He is reported to have 'died of that loathsome disorder, the morbus pediculosus.'

His namesake, David Erskine Baker, in the Biographia Dramatica, undertakes at some length his defence. He states that a character named Maiden, introduced in Tunbridge Walks, the best-known comedy of Thomas Baker, was intended by the author for himself. The character sprang into favour, and was imitated in the Fribbles and Beau Mizens of subsequent comedy.

== Works ==
The plays of Baker, all of them comedies, consist of:

- The Humour of the Age 1701, played the same year at Drury Lane, with Robert Wilks, Susanna Verbruggen, and Anne Oldfield in the principal parts.
- Tunbridge Walks, 1703, played 27 January of the same year at Drury Lane; revived at the same theatre in 1738 and 1764, and at Covent Garden in 1748, and given, in three acts, under the title of Tunbridge Wells, at the Haymarket, as late as 13 August 1782, by Palmer, Pursons, and Mrs. Inchbald.
- An Act at Oxford, 1704. This piece, one scene in which is in the theatre at Oxford, disclosing the doctors, the undergraduates, and the ladies, in their proper places, commences with the two opening lines of the 'Iliad,' delivered in Greek by Bloom, a gentleman commoner. Its performance was prohibited, it is supposed through university influence, and it saw the footlights in an altered version, called 'Hampstead Heath,' Drury Lane, 30 Oct. 1705. Under this title it was reprinted in 1706.
- The Fine Lady's Airs, no date (1709), played at Drury Lane 14 December 1708, and revived 20 April 1747.

A reference to some of these plays and to the author occurs in the preface to the 'Modern Prophets, or New Wit for a Husband,' a comedy by Thomas Durfey, London, no date (1709). In this Durfey speaks not very intelligibly of Baker as one of 'a couple of bloody male criticks,' from whose 'barbarous assassinating attempts' he has escaped. Durfey condemns the plotless and trifling quality of 'Tunbridge Walks,' accuses Baker, in reference to two other comedies, of having 'brought Oxford upon Hampstead Heath,' and declares that the 'Fine Ladies Airs' (sic) was 'deservedly hist' (hissed). Baker's plays are indeed 'plotless.' They are fairly written, however, and are up to the not very exalted level of comedies of the period. Baker is credited with the authorship of the 'Female Tatler' (London, 1709), which Lowndes, who omits all mention of Baker under his name, describes as a 'scurrilous periodical paper.' After 1709 all reference to Baker ceases.
