= George Farquhar =

Irish dramatist (1677–1707)

- Born: 1677; Derry, Ireland
- Died: 29 April 1707 (aged 29–30); London, England
- Occupation: Dramatist
- Spouse: Margaret Pemell (m. 1703)
- Writing career
- Genre: Comedy

George Farquhar (1677 – 29 April 1707) was an Irish dramatist. He is noted for his contributions to late Restoration comedy, particularly for his plays The Constant Couple (1699), The Recruiting Officer (1706) and The Beaux' Stratagem (1707).

== Early life ==
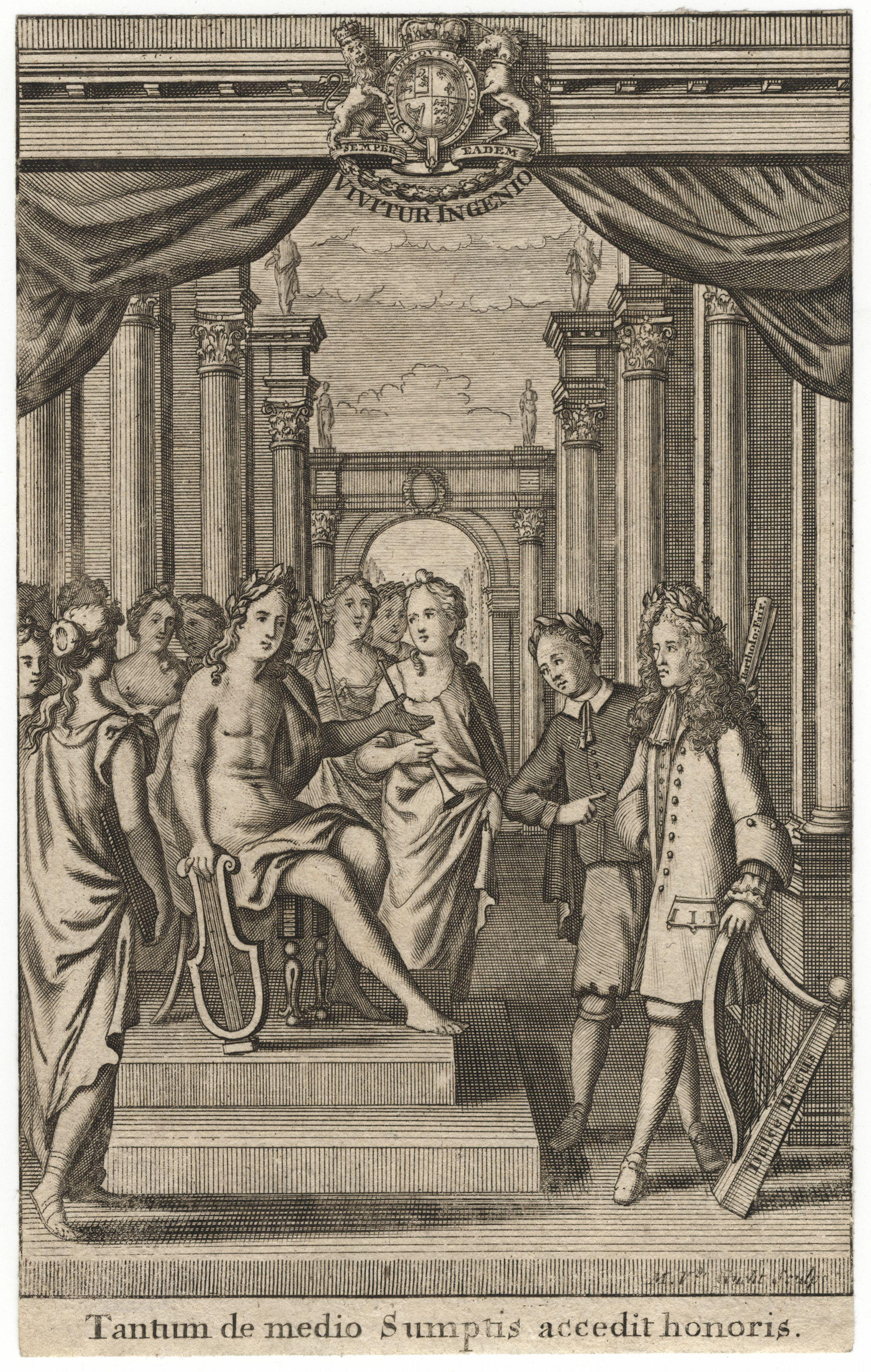
Engraving of a performance of George Farquhar by Michiel van der Gucht after unknown artist, published 1711

Born in Derry, Farquhar was one of seven children born to William Farquhar, a clergyman of modest means. The author of "Memoirs of Mr. George Farquhar", a biographical sketch prefixed to certain 18th-century editions of his works, claims that Farquhar

discovered a Genius early devoted to the Muses. When he was very young, he gave Specimens of his Poetry; and discovered a Force of Thinking, and Turn of Expression, much beyond his years.

He was educated at Foyle College and later entered Trinity College Dublin at age 17 as a sizar under the patronage of the Bishop of Dromore, who may have been related to Farquhar's mother. Farquhar may have initially intended to follow his father's profession and become a clergyman, but was "unhappy and rebellious as a student" and left college after two years to become an actor. According to an 18th-century biographer, Farquhar's "gay and volatile Disposition could not long relish the Gravity and Retirement of a College-life," and Trinity College may have expelled him over a "profane jest."

== Acting career ==
Farquhar joined a company performing on the Dublin stage, probably through his acquaintance with the well-known actor Robert Wilks. However, Farquhar was reportedly not that impressive as an actor. We are told that "his Voice was somewhat weak" and that "his movements [were] stiff and ungraceful." However, he was well received by audiences and thought to continue in this career "till something better should offer." Some of the roles reportedly played by Farquhar were Lennox in Shakespeare's Macbeth, Young Bellair in The Man of Mode by George Etherege, Lord Dion in Philaster by Beaumont and Fletcher, and Guyomar in The Indian Emperor by John Dryden.

While he was performing in the Dryden play, an accident on stage put an end to Farquhar's acting career. As Guyomar, Farquhar was supposed to "kill" Vasquez, one of the Spanish generals in the drama. Forgetting to exchange his sword for a foil before enacting this scene, Farquhar severely wounded Price, the actor playing Vasquez. Although Price recovered, Farquhar resolved after this mishap to give up acting for good.

== Writing career ==
Farquhar then left for London, "possibly with a draft of his first play in his portmanteau." Some writers tie his move to that of his friend Wilks, who had received an offer from the manager of Drury Lane to come to London and join that theatre, and Wilks is also credited with encouraging Farquhar's efforts at writing plays.

Farquhar's first comedy, Love and a Bottle, was premiered in 1698; "for its sprightly Dialogue and busy Scenes," it is said to have been "well received by the Audience." Called a "licentious piece" by one scholar, and cited as proof that Farquhar had "absorbed the stock topics, character-types, and situations of Restoration comedy" by another, the play deals with Roebuck, "An Irish Gentleman of a wild roving Temper" who is "newly come to London." The general character of the play can be evaluated by considering that in the opening scene, Roebuck tells his friend Lovewell that he has left Ireland due to getting a woman pregnant with twins (a boy and a girl) and to Roebuck's father trying to force Roebuck to marry the woman; however, Roebuck remarks, "Heav'n was pleas'd to lessen my Affliction, by taking away the She-brat."

After the favourable reception of Love and a Bottle, Farquhar decided to devote himself to playwriting. He also at this point received a commission in the regiment of the Earl of Orrery, so his time for the next few years was divided between the vocations of soldier and dramatist. It was also at about this time that Farquhar discovered Anne Oldfield, who was reading aloud a scene from The Scornful Lady at her aunt's tavern. Impressed, he brought her to the notice of Sir John Vanbrugh, and this led to her theatrical career, during which she was the first performer of major female roles in Farquhar's last comedies.

In 1700, Farquhar's The Constant Couple was acted at Drury Lane and proved a great success, helped considerably by his friend Wilks' portrayal of the character of Sir Henry Wildair (a performance that Farquhar himself praised generously in his "Preface to the Reader" when the play was published). The playwright followed up with a sequel, Sir Harry Wildair, the following year, and in 1702 wrote the comedies The Inconstant and The Twin Rivals. Also in 1702, Farquhar published Love and Business, a collection that included letters, verse, and A Discourse Upon Comedy.

The next year, he married Margaret Pemell, "a widow with three children, ten years his senior," who reportedly tricked him into the marriage by pretending to have a great fortune. His 18th century biographer records that "though he found himself deceived, his Circumstances embarrassed, and his Family increasing, he never upbraided her for the Cheat, but behaved to her with all the Delicacy and Tenderness of an indulgent Husband." He was engaged in recruiting for the army, due to the War of the Spanish Succession, for the next three years, writing little except The Stage Coach in collaboration with Peter Motteux; this was an adaptation of a French play. He drew on his recruiting experience for his next comedy, The Recruiting Officer (1706). However, Farquhar had to sell his army commission to pay debts, reportedly after the Duke of Ormonde advised him to do so, promising him another but failing to keep his promise.

Early in 1707, Farquhar's friend Wilks visited him; Farquhar was ill and in distress, and Wilks is said to have "cheered him with a substantial present, and urged him to write another comedy." This comedy, The Beaux' Stratagem, was given its première on 8 March 1707; we know from Farquhar's own statement prefacing the published version of the play that he wrote it during his sickness:

The reader may find some faults in this play, which my illness prevented the amending of; but there is great amends made in the representation, which cannot be match'd, no more than the friendly and indefatigable care of Mr. Wilks, to whom I chiefly owe the success of the play.

Farquhar died on 29 April 1707, not quite two months after the opening of this last play. He was buried in the Church of St. Martin in the Fields, London, on 3 May.

== Works referencing Farquhar ==
- The 1987 play, Our Country's Good by Timberlake Wertenbaker, revolves around the story of 18th-century Australian convicts attempting to put on Farquhar's The Recruiting Officer. Wertenbaker's play is based on a novel by Thomas Keneally.
- Bertolt Brecht set his adaptation of The Recruiting Officer, called Pauken und Trompeten, in America during the Civil War.
- In Act III of She Stoops to Conquer by Oliver Goldsmith, Kate Hardcastle asks her maid, "Tell me, Pimple, how do you like my present dress? Don't you think I look something like Cherry in the Beaux Stratagem?" A theatrical notice in the New York Times for 7 February 1885 remarked that at that date Goldsmith's allusion was "all that the stage [had] known of George Farquhar for many a year."
- Alexander Pope famously refers to the playwright in "The First Epistle of the Second Book of Horace, Imitated," where he comments (line 288), "What pert low Dialogue has Farqu'ar writ!" (It has been argued that this is not an attack by Pope on Farquhar, but an illustration of "how seldom ev'n the best succeed" two lines earlier.)
- In his essay "On Actors and Acting," essayist William Hazlitt praises the reformative power of the last act of Farquar's play The Inconstant, calling it "[t]he most striking lesson ever read to levity and licentiousness...where young Mirabel is preserved by the fidelity of his mistress, Orinda, in the disguise of a page, from the hands of assassins, into whose power he has been allured by the temptations of vice and beauty. There never was a rake who did not become in imagination a reformed man during the representation of the last trying scenes of this admirable comedy."

== See also ==
- List of Northern Irish writers
- Timberlake Wertenbaker

== Sources ==
- Shirley Strum Kenny, editor (1988). The Works of George Farquhar. Oxford University Press, two volumes.
- Barry Sales (2014). "The Landlord's Tale" (1708). Eighteenth Century Studies, volume 47, no. 3. An anonymous poem, probably written by George Farquhar.
