= Richard Estcourt =

English actor (1668–1712)

Richard Estcourt (1668–1712) was an English actor, who began by playing comedy parts in Dublin.

His first London appearance was in 1704 as Dominick, in Dryden's Spanish Friar, and he continued to take important parts at Drury Lane, being the original Pounce in Steele's Tender Husband (1705), Sergeant Kite in Farquhar's Recruiting Officer, and Sir Francis Gripe in Mrs Centlivre's Busybody. He was an excellent mimic and a great favourite socially.

Estcourt wrote a comedy, The Fair Example, or the Modish Citizen (1703), and Prunella (1704), an interlude. He also was the first president of the first London Beefsteak Club.
