= William Pinkethman =

British actor (c.1660–1725)

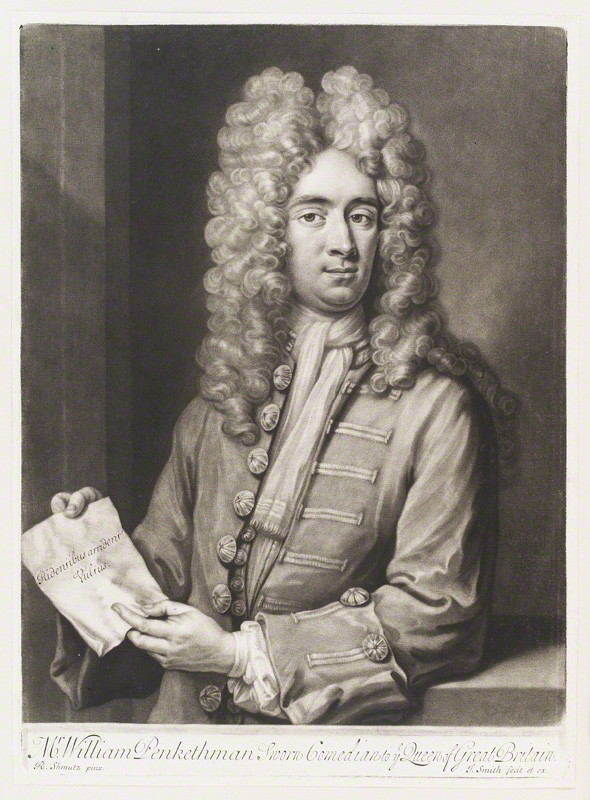
William Pinkethman, 1709 engraving by John Smith after Johann Rudolph Schmutz

William Pinkethman (also Penkethman, Pinkeman, Pinkerman, etc.; nicknamed Pinkey, c.1660–1725) was an English comic actor, a low comedian with a droll style, and theatre manager. He was considered an imitator of Anthony Leigh.

Starting in the 1690s Penkethman performed with the United Company at Drury Lane. He largely played small roles, then became known for his delivery of prologues and epilogues in plays. He was known for performing riding a donkey. He later opened a theatre at Richmond.

== Rising actor ==
Pinkethman overcame a weakness for overacting and playing to the crowd to become a steady performer. He is first heard of at the Theatre Royal, in 1692, in Thomas Shadwell's The Volunteers, in which he played Stitchum the tailor, an original part of six lines. After the departure in 1695 of Thomas Betterton and his associates, Pinkethman was promoted to a better line of parts. In 1702 he was the original Old Mirabel in George Farquhar's The Inconstant. He also recited what was known as "Pinkethman's Epilogue". He was known for his ad libs. It was at this period that Charles Gildon, in his Comparison between Two Stages, spoke of him as "a fellow that overdoes everything, and spoils many a part with his own stuff."

In 1703 Pinkethman created Squib in Thomas Baker's Tunbridge Walks, Maggothead (mayor of Coventry) in Thomas D'Urfey's Old Mode and the New, and Whimsey in Richard Estcourt's Fair Example. At the booth in Bartholomew Fair, which he held with William Bullock and Thomas Simpson, he played on 24 August 1703 Toby in Jephtha's Rash Vow, a droll. After the merger of the Haymarket and Drury Lane companies in 1708, fewer original characters came to Pinkethman, who, however, was assigned important parts in standard plays. On 4 April 1707, for his benefit, he spoke with Jubilee Dicky (Henry Norris) a new epilogue. The two actors represented the figures of Somebody and Nobody. At the Haymarket Theatre he created, on 12 December 1709, Clinch in Susannah Centlivre's Man's Bewitched, and on 1 May 1710 Faschinetti in Charles Johnson's Love in a Chest.

== Branching out ==
From 1698 Pinkethman also operated as a promoter and impresario of entertainments outside the major theatres. There was scope for these activities when the summer season closed the theatres, and he combined fairground booths, theatre and spectacle for the rest of his life, succeeding financially.

On 15 June 1710 Pinkethman opened a theatre in Greenwich, where he played comedy and tragedy. It lasted until September 1711. On 9 September 1717 he acted Old Merriman in a droll called Twice Married and a Maid still, given at his booth taken with George Pack, at Southwark Fair.

== Last years ==
On 19 February 1718 Pinkethman was, at Drury Lane, the first Ringwood in John Breval's The Play is the Plot. In the late 1710s he established the Richmond Theatre in London where he was for sure actively staging works in 1719 and 1722, and possibly in the years in-between. On 14 February 1721 he was the original Sir Gilbert Wrangle in Cibber's The Refusal. This appears to have been practically his last original part. On 9 January 1723 he was Pyramus in the burlesque scene from Midsummer Night's Dream fitted into Love in a Forest, an alteration of As you like it. On 23 May 1724 he appeared in Epsom Wells (Thomas Shadwell), for his benefit. At an uncertain date he played Judge Tutchin in Lodowick Barry's Ram Alley, or Merry Tricks.

== Family ==
Pinkethman, described as a bachelor of St. Paul's, Covent Garden, married, on 22 November 1714, at Bow Church, Middlesex, Elizabeth Hill, of St. Paul's, Shadwell. Pinkethman's booth was handed on to his son, who also acted. At the opening of Covent Garden Theatre, 7 Dec. 1732, he played Waitwell in The Way of the World, was Antonio in Chances at Drury Lane, 23 November 1739, and died 15 May 1740.

== Attribution ==
This article incorporates text from a publication now in the public domain: Lee, Sidney, ed. (1896). "Pinkethman, William". Dictionary of National Biography. Vol. 45. London: Smith, Elder & Co.

== Bibliography ==
- F. H. Mares, ‘Pinkethman, William (c.1660x65–1725)’, Oxford Dictionary of National Biography, Oxford University Press, 2004, accessed 6 Sept 2007
