= Benjamin Johnson (actor) =

English actor (1665–1742)

Benjamin Johnson (c. 1665 – 1742) was an English actor.

== Bibliography ==
Johnson was first a scene painter, then acted in the provinces, and appeared in London in 1695 at Drury Lane after Thomas Betterton's defection. He was the original Captain Driver in Oronooko (1696), Captain Fireball in George Farquhar's Sir Harry Wildair (1701) and Sable in Richard Steele's The Funeral (1702); he was particularly well regarded as the First Gravedigger in Hamlet and as several characters in the plays of Ben Jonson. He also succeeded to Thomas Doggett's roles. In 1715 he starred in John Gay's hit comedy The What D'Ye Call It at Drury Lane.
