= William Bullock (actor) =

English actor

William Bullock (c. 1657 – c. 1740) was an English actor, "of great glee and much comic vivacity." He played at all the London theatres of his time, and in the summer at a booth at Bartholomew Fair.

== Life ==
Bullock's name is mentioned in Downes's "Roscius Anglicanus." He first appears in the cast of Colley Cibber's "Love's Last Shift," produced by the associated companies of Drury Lane and Dorset Garden, 1696, where he played the character Sly. He had joined the companies the previous year. Among his original characters were Sir Tunbelly Clumsy in the "Relapse," 1697, and Soto in She Would and She Would Not 1702. He also played with success many parts in the plays of John Dryden, William Wycherley, Thomas Shadwell. Until 1706, he was at Drury Lane.

He then went to the Haymarket, returning to Drury Lane in 1708. After another brief migration to the Haymarket, followed by a new return to Drury Lane, he definitely left the latter theatre, 1715–16, for Lincoln's Inn Fields, where he remained until 1726. He was the original Clincher in Farquhar's The Constant Couple (1699), Boniface in The Beaux' Stratagem (1707), Twang the turn-key in A City Ramble and Sir Francis Courtall in Tavener's The Artful Wife (1717). In 1719 he appeared in Kensington Gardens by John Leigh. He played Jemmy Twitcher in premiere of The Beggar's Opera 1728 at John Rich's Theatre Royal Lincoln's Inn Fields

His death is said to have taken place on 18 June 1733, a date which has been accepted by most subsequent writers. He had a benefit, however, at Covent Garden on 6 January 1739, described on the bills as 'his first appearance on the stage for six years,' when he played Dominic in Dryden's "Spanish Fryar."

In his address to the public he pleaded his great age, upwards of threescore and twelve, as a reason for indulgence. He played again on 25 April 1739, for the benefit of Stephen, the Host in the Merry Wives of Windsor, a favourite character. He had, according to Genest, in the summer a booth at Bartholomew Fair, at which he acted. After this no more is heard of him.

== Family ==
William Bullock had three sons, all actors, of whom the eldest was Christopher Bullock (c. 1690–1724), who at Drury Lane, the Haymarket and Lincoln's Inn Fields displayed "a considerable versatility of talent."

Christopher created a few original parts in comedies and farces of which he was the author or adapter:—A Woman's Revenge (1715); Slip; Adventures of Half an Hour (1716); The Cobbler of Preston; Woman's a Riddle; The Perjurer (1717); and The Traitor (1718).
