= 1720 in literature =

This article is a summary of the major literary events and publications of 1720.

== Events ==
- September–October – The "South Sea Bubble", i.e. the collapse of the South Sea Company in England, affects the fortunes of many writers, including John Gay. It features in several works of literature. There are suspicions of complicity by Robert Walpole's government.
- December 29 – The Haymarket Theatre in London opens with a performance of La Fille à la Morte, ou le Badeaut de Paris.
- unknown date
  - Jonathan Swift begins major composition work on Gulliver's Travels in Ireland.
  - 18-year-old London apprentice printer John Matthews is hanged for treason for producing the anonymous Jacobite pamphlet Vox Populi Vox Dei, the last time a British printer suffers execution for his work.

== New books ==
=== Prose ===
- Thomas Boston – Human Nature in its Fourfold State
- Jane Brereton – An expostulatory Epistle to Sir Richard Steele upon the Death of Mr. Addison
- Thomas Brown – The Remains of Mr. Thomas Brown
- Josiah Burchett – A Complete History of the Most Remarkable Transactions at Sea
- William Rufus Chetwood – The Voyages, Dangerous Adventures, and Miraculous Escapes of Capt. Richard Falconer
- Samuel Croxall – The Fair Circassian
- Daniel Defoe
  - Captain Singleton
  - Memoirs of a Cavalier
  - Serious Reflections During the Life and Surprising Adventures of Robinson Crusoe: With his Vision of the Angelick World
- Charles Gildon – All for the Better (fiction)
- Thomas Hearne – A Collection of Curious Discourses
- Aaron Hill – The Creation
- Edward Hyde, 1st Earl of Clarendon – The History of the Rebellion and Civil Wars in Ireland
- Hildebrand Jacob – The Curious Maid
- Madame de La Fayette – Histoire d'Henriette d'Angleterre
- Delarivière Manley – The Power of Love (novels)
- Benedetto Marcello (anonymous) – Il teatro alla moda
- Alexander Pennecuik – Streams From Hellicon
- Alexander Pope – The Iliad of Homer v, vi
- Richard Rawlinson – The English Topographer
- Martha Sansom – The Epistles of Clio and Strephon
- George Sewell – A New Collection of Original Poems
- Richard Steele
  - The Crisis of Property
  - A Nation a Family
- Jonathan Swift – A Proposal for the Universal Use of Irish Manufacture
- William Temple – The Works of Sir William Temple
- Simon Tyssot de Patot – La Vie, les Aventures et le Voyage de Groenland du Révérend Père Cordelier Pierre de Mésange
- Ned Ward – The Delights of the Bottle

=== Drama ===
- Matthew Concanen – Wexford Wells
- Benjamin Griffin – Whig and Tory
- John Gay – Dione
- John Hughes – The Siege of Damascus
- John Leigh – Hob's Wedding
- Pierre de Marivaux
  - L'Amour et la vérité
  - Arlequin poli par l'amour
- Charles Molloy – The Half-Pay Officers
- John Mottley – The Imperial Captives
- Charles Shadwell – Irish Hospitality

=== Poetry ===
- John Gay – Poems on Several Occasions
- A New Miscellany of Original Poems (anthology)
- Matthew Prior – The Conversation
- Allan Ramsay
  - A Poem on the South-Sea
  - Poems

== Births ==
- January 8 – James Merrick, English poet and scholar (died 1769)
- January 13 – Richard Hurd, English writer and bishop (died 1808)
- January 27 (baptized) – Samuel Foote, English actor and playwright (died 1777)
- July 18 – Gilbert White, English naturalist (died 1793)
- October 2 – Elizabeth Montagu, English scholar and bluestocking (died 1800)
- October 17 – Jacques Cazotte, French romance writer (died 1792)
- October 19 – John Woolman, American Quaker diarist and preacher (died 1772)
- November 28 – Madeleine de Puisieux, French philosopher and feminist writer (died 1798)
- December 13 – Carlo Gozzi, Italian playwright (died 1806)

== Deaths ==
- February 17 – John Hughes, English poet, editor and translator (born C. 1678)
- April 21 – Antoine Hamilton Irish writer in French (born 1646)
- June 27 – Guillaume Amfrye de Chaulieu, French poet and wit (born 1639)
- August 5 – Anne Finch, Countess of Winchilsea, English poet (born 1661)
- August 9 – Simon Ockley, English orientalist (born 1678)
- August 17 – Anne Dacier (Madame Dacier), French scholar and translator (born c. 1654)
- September 1 – Eusèbe Renaudot, French theologian and orientalist (born 1646)
- September 9 – Philippe de Dangeau, French author and army officer (born 1638)
- Unknown date – Shalom Shabazi, Jewish Yemeni rabbi and poet (born 1619)
- Probable year – Mihai Iștvanovici, Wallachian typographer and poet (born c. 1648)
