= Charles Williams (English actor) =

British stage actor (1693–1731)

Charles Williams (1693–1731) was a British stage actor.

Williams joined the company at the Theatre Royal, Drury Lane in 1718 and remained with it to his death in the year of his 38th birthday.

== Selected roles ==
- Lorenzo in Love in a Veil by Richard Savage (1718)
- Herbis in The Siege of Damascus by John Hughes (1720)
- Alan in The Briton by Ambrose Philips (1722)
- Earl of Warwick in Humphrey, Duke of Gloucester by Ambrose Philips (1723)
- Ammon in The Fatal Constancy by Hildebrand Jacob (1723)
- Duke Frederick in Love in a Forest by Charles Johnson (1723)
- Araxes in The Captives by John Gay (1724)
- Decius in Caesar in Egypt by Colley Cibber (1724)
- Julio in Double Falsehood by Lewis Theobald (1727)
- Amyntas in Love in a Riddle by Colley Cibber (1729)
- Freeman in The Village Opera by Charles Johnson (1729)
- Scipio in Sophonisba by James Thomson (1730)
- Dinarchus in Timoleon by Benjamin Martyn (1730)

== Bibliography ==
- Brean, Hammond (ed.) Double Falsehood. AC & Black, 2010.
- Highfill, Philip H, Burnim, Kalman A. & Langhans, Edward A. A Biographical Dictionary of Actors, Actresses, Musicians, Dancers, Managers, and Other Stage Personnel in London, 1660-1800: West to Zwingman. SIU Press, 1973.
