= Agamemnon (Thomson play) =

Play by James Thomson

- Original language: English
- Written by: James Thomson
- Genre: Tragedy

Premiere
- Date: 6 April 1738
- Place: Theatre Royal, Drury Lane

Agamemnon is a 1738 tragedy by the British writer James Thomson. It is based on the story of Agamemnon from Greek Mythology.

The original Drury Lane cast included James Quin as Agamemnon, William Milward as Egistus, Theophilus Cibber as Melisander, William Havard as Talthybius, Mary Porter as Clytemnestra, Sussanah Arne as Cassandra, Anne Brett as Electra and Thomas Wright as Arcas. The prologue was written by Thomson's friend David Mallet, with Thomson returning the favour by adding a prologue to Mallet's Mustapha the following year.

== Bibliography ==
- Baines, Paul & Ferarro, Julian & Rogers, Pat. The Wiley-Blackwell Encyclopedia of Eighteenth-Century Writers and Writing, 1660-1789. Wiley-Blackwell, 2011.
- Nicoll, Allardyce. A History of Early Eighteenth Century Drama: 1700-1750. CUP Archive, 1927.
