= John Roberts (stage actor) =

British stage actor

John Roberts was a British stage actor of the eighteenth century.

During the early 1720s he was a member of the Drury Lane company. He then left the company for a number of years before returning in 1728. He remained in the Dury Lane company until 1734, but also made appearances at the Haymarket Theatre and in summer performances at Bartholomew Fair. From 1734 he primarily appeared at the Covent Garden Theatre. His career was generally overshadowed by that of his wife, billed as Mrs Roberts during their marriage.

== Selected roles ==
- Messenger in The Briton by Ambrose Philips (1722)
- Roberto in Love in a Forest by Charles Johnson (1723)
- First Centurion in Caesar in Egypt by Colley Cibber (1724)
- Talthybius in Hecuba by Richard West (1726)
- Old Apeall in The Humours of Oxford by Charles Johnson (1730)
- Aeschylus in Timoleon by Benjamin Martyn (1730)
- Narva in Sophonisba by James Thomson (1730)
- Trapwell in Pasquin by Henry Fielding (1736)

== Bibliography ==
- Highfill, Philip H, Burnim, Kalman A. & Langhans, Edward A. A Biographical Dictionary of Actors, Actresses, Musicians, Dancers, Managers, and Other Stage Personnel in London, 1660–1800: Volume XIII. SIU Press, 1978.
