= Tom's Coffee House =

Historical coffee house in London

Engraving of the lid of a snuffbox from Tom's Coffee House in Russell Street.

Tom's Coffee House was a coffeehouse at No. 17 Russell Street, Covent Garden, London, one of several establishments of the same name (see other Tom's coffee-houses). It stood on the north side of the street, opposite Button's, and was named after its original proprietor, Thomas West. It was established about 1700 and continued to be used as a coffee-house until 1814. The house was pulled down in 1865.

Tom's was frequented by actors, writers and members of the nobility. Among the members of its subscription club were David Garrick, Samuel Foote, Samuel Johnson and Oliver Goldsmith. The premises were later occupied by coin dealers. William Till exhibited his coins on the tables which had been used by the club.

== Early history ==
The upper portion of the premises was the coffee-house. Under it lived T. Lewis, the bookseller, the original publisher, in 1711, of Pope's Essay on Criticism. In 1727, The Craftsman was printed for R. Francklin "under Tom's Coffee-house in Covent Garden". On 26 November 1722 West threw himself from a second-floor window and died.

A Journey through England described the company at Tom's and the nearby Will's:

After the play, the best company generally go to Tom's and Will's coffee-houses, near adjoining, where there is playing at piquet and the best conversation till midnight. Here you will see blue and green ribbons, with stars, sitting familiarly and talking with the same freedom as if they had left their quality and degrees of distance at home.

The ribbons and stars were the insignia of orders of chivalry. The engraver Grignon remembered seeing the "balcony of Tom's crowded with noblemen in their stars and garters, drinking their tea and coffee exposed to the people". Arthur Murphy recalled Mr Ince, a contributor to The Spectator, who used to frequent Tom's.

== Subscription club ==
In 1764 a club appears to have been formed at Tom's by a guinea subscription. The large front room on the first floor was the card-room. In 1768, when the club had "considerably enlarged itself of late", Thomas Haines, the then proprietor, took in the front room of the next house westward as a coffee-room. The front room of No. 17 was then appropriated exclusively as a card-room for the subscription club, each member paying one guinea annually. The adjoining apartment was used as a conversation-room.

The subscription books examined by John Timbs contained nearly 700 names, including members of the nobility, foreign ministers, gentry and men of letters. Among them were Foote, Murphy, Garrick, the singer John Beard, Sir John Fielding and Robert Clive. The list also included Johnson, Goldsmith, the dramatist George Colman, the printer William Bowyer and Count Brühl, the Polish minister.

The books contained the name of Sir Thomas Robinson, known as "Long Sir Thomas Robinson". Foote, Robinson and Dr Dodd were frequent names among the club musters. Robinson, in Timbs's words, seems to have been "something like a proposer-general".

In the parish books of St Paul's, Covent Garden is an entry for 46 dishes of chocolate, 34 jellies and biscuits.

The elder Haines, from his polite address, was called "Lord Chesterfield" among the club. His granddaughter possessed a portrait of him by Dance, and a portrait in oil of the younger Haines by Grignon, when Timbs wrote in 1866.

== Closure and successors ==
The coffee-house business closed in 1814. William Till, the coin dealer, later occupied the premises. The card-room remained in its original condition. "The tables on which I exhibit my coins", Till wrote, "are those which were used by the exalted characters whose names are extracted from books of the Club, still in possession of the proprietress of the house."

On Till's death, Webster succeeded to the tenancy and collection of coins and medals, which he removed to No. 6 Henrietta Street shortly before the old premises were taken down. The house was pulled down in 1865. The premises had remained with little alteration long after they ceased to be a coffee-house.

In 1866 Webster possessed, by marriage with a granddaughter of the younger Haines, the old club books and the snuffbox of the club-room. It was of large size and fine tortoiseshell. Upon the lid, in high relief in silver, were portraits of Charles I and Queen Anne, and the Boscobel oak with Charles II amid its branches. The name Thomas Haines was inscribed on the lid.

== Other Tom's coffee-houses ==
Many London coffee-houses bore the name Tom's in the early eighteenth century. They included houses in St Martin's Lane and Devereux Court near Temple Bar. In the City, one in Birchin Lane was known as "Old Tom's", distinct from another at No. 3 Cornhill. Others were recorded in Fulwood's Rents in Holborn, Ludgate Hill, Wood Street in Cheapside and Spring Garden near Charing Cross. A coffee-house of the same name was also mentioned in Maiden Lane, Covent Garden, around 1711.
