= John Thurmond =

British stage actor

John Thurmond (died 1727) was a British stage actor. To distinguish him from his son, also an actor named John, he is sometimes called John Thurmond the Elder.

His earliest known stage performance was in 1695, when he played in Cyrus the Great with Thomas Betterton's troupe at the Lincoln's Inn Fields Theatre. Around 1699 he joined the Smock Alley Theatre where he acted alongside his wife Winifred. By 1708 he was back in London with the Drury Lane Theatre. He died on 7 September 1727 the same night he had been due to appear in Othello. He was buried in St Paul's, Covent Garden, alongside his wife Winifred who died in 1736.

== Selected roles ==
- Artabasus in Cyrus the Great by John Banks (1695)
- Frederick in The She-Gallants by George Granville (1695)
- Friendly in The City Bride by Joseph Harris (1696)
- Rodrigo in The Italian Husband by Edward Ravenscroft (1697)
- Bellgard in Fatal Friendship by Catharine Trotter Cockburn (1698)
- Ubaldo in Rinaldo and Armida by John Dennis (1698)
- Sir James Thyrrold in Queen Catharine by Mary Pix (1698)
- Lord Courtipell in The Pretenders by Thomas Dilke (1698)
- Cleontes in Xerxes by Colley Cibber (1699)
- Spinola in The Princess of Parma by Henry Smith (1699)
- Lorenzo in False Friend by Mary Pix (1699)
- Belvoir in The Beau Defeated by Mary Pix (1700)
- Hamlet in Hamlet by William Shakespeare (1708)
- Honorius in Lucius by Delarivier Manley (1717)
- Don Philip in Love in a Veil by Richard Savage (1718)
- Syphoces in Busiris, King of Egypt by Edward Young (1719)
- Abudah in The Siege of Damascus by John Hughes (1720)
- Don Alverez in The Revenge by Edward Young (1721)
- Didius in The Briton by Ambrose Philips (1722)
- Oliver in Love in a Forest by Charles Johnson (1723)
- Earl of Salisbury in Humphrey, Duke of Gloucester by Ambrose Philips (1723)
- Second Centurion in Caesar in Egypt by Colley Cibber (1724)
- Maelaines in Hecuba by Richard West (1726)

== Bibliography ==
- Highfill, Philip H, Burnim, Kalman A. & Langhans, Edward A. A Biographical Dictionary of Actors, Actresses, Musicians, Dancers, Managers, and Other Stage Personnel in London, 1660-1800: Volume 14. SIU Press, 1991.
