= Dione (play) =

Play by John Gay

- Written by: John Gay
- Original language: English
- Genre: Tragedy

Dione is a 1720 tragedy by the British writer John Gay.

It marked a departure from the comedies he had made his name with. It was also the first full-length play he had written alone since The Wife of Bath in 1713. It is likely Gay started writing it either before or during a recent trip he had made to Paris.

While it was planned to be staged at the Drury Lane Theatre, in the event the play was never performed. Although a command was given by the Lord Chamberlain, the Duke of Newcastle that the play should "be immediately acted" after The Siege of Damascus by John Hughes in February 1720, this did not happen. It is possible that the Drury Lane management were not attracted by the style of Gay's work, a pastoral tragedy written in rhyming couplets, and therefore ignored the order to stage the play.

Gay wrote another tragedy The Captives, which was staged at Drury Lane, before turning back to comedy to produce his greatest success The Beggar's Opera.

== Bibliography ==
- Burling, William J. A Checklist of New Plays and Entertainments on the London Stage, 1700-1737. Fairleigh Dickinson Univ Press, 1992.
- Nokes, David. John Gay, a Profession of Friendship. Oxford University Press, 1995.
- Winton, Calhoun. John Gay and the London Theatre. University Press of Kentucky, 2014.
