= Timoleon (play) =

1730 play

- Original language: English
- Written by: Benjamin Martyn
- Genre: Tragedy

Premiere
- Date: 26 January 1730
- Place: Theatre Royal, Drury Lane

Timoleon is a 1730 tragedy by the British writer Benjamin Martyn. It is based on the life of the Greek statesman Timoleon, leader of Syracuse during the Sicilian Wars against Carthage.

The original Drury Lane cast included John Mills as Timoleon, Roger Bridgewater as Timophanes, William Mills as Olinthus, John Corey as Orthagoras, Charles Williams as Dinarchus, James Rosco as Pheron, John Bowman as Ghost, John Roberts as Aeschylus Mary Porter as Eusensia and Jane Cibber as Cleone. The prologue was spoken by Robert Wilks, and the epilogue by Anne Oldfield.

== Bibliography ==
- Burling, William J. A Checklist of New Plays and Entertainments on the London Stage, 1700-1737. Fairleigh Dickinson Univ Press, 1992.
- Nicoll, Allardyce. A History of Early Eighteenth Century Drama: 1700-1750. CUP Archive, 1927.
