= The History of the Saracens =

Book by Simon Ockley

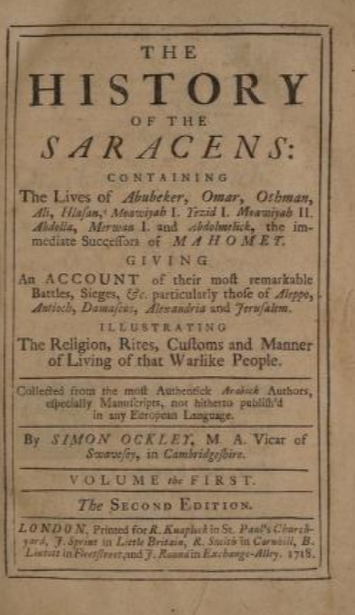
- Title page for The History of the Saracens (1718 edition)
- Author: Simon Ockley
- Language: English
- Subject: Caliphs; Islamic Empire
- Publication date: 1708 vol. I 1718 vol. II
- Publication place: Kingdom of Great Britain
- Media type: Hardback

The History of the Saracens is a book written by Simon Ockley of Cambridge University and first published in the early 18th century. The book has been reprinted many times, including at London in 1894. It was published in two volumes that appeared a decade apart.

== The author ==
Simon Ockley, vicar of Swavesey, Cambridgeshire, devoted himself from an early age to the study of eastern languages and customs and was appointed Sir Thomas Adams Professor of Arabic at Cambridge in 1711. The first volume of his work generally known as The History of the Saracens, appeared in 1708 as Conquest of Syria, Persia, and Egypt by the Saracens, the second in 1718, with an introduction dated from Cambridge Castle, where he was then imprisoned for debt. Edward Gibbon, who admired and used his work, speaks of his fate as "unworthy of the man and of his country."

== Contents ==
Ockley's History extends from the death of Mahomet in 632, to that of Abd al-Malik ibn Marwan in 705; the work was left unfinished due to the author's death in 1720. The Life of Mohammed prefixed to the third edition of his History, which was issued for the benefit of his destitute daughter in 1757, is by Roger Long.

== Reputation and influence of the work ==
Ockley based his work on an Arabic manuscript in the Bodleian Library which later scholars have pronounced less trustworthy than he imagined it to be. Stanley Lane-Poole in the Dictionary of National Biography wrote that:

The work was based upon a manuscript in the Bodleian Library ascribed to the Arabic historian El-Wâkidî, with additions from El-Mekîn, Abû-l-Fidâ, Abû-l-Faraj, and others. Hamaker, however, has proved that the manuscript in question is not the celebrated 'Kitâb el-Maghâzî' of El-Wâkidî, but the 'Futûh esh-Sham,' a work of little authority, which has even been characterised as 'romance rather than history'

citing the opinion of William Robertson Smith in the article on Ockley from the ninth edition of the Encyclopædia Britannica. The author in question is now known as pseudo-Waqidi. Lane-Poole notes that the History

formed for generations the main source of the average notions of early Mohammedan history.

Alfred Rayney Waller described the author's work:

His English is pure, and simple, his narrative extraordinarily vivid and dramatic, and told in words exactly suited to his subject—whether he is describing how Caulah and her companions kept their Damascene captors at bay until her brother Derar and his horsemen came to deliver them, or telling the tragic story of the death of Hosein. The book was translated into French [by A.F. Jault] in 1748, and was long held to be authoritative. As a history, its defects are patent, its account of the conquest of Persia, for example, is so slight that even the decisive battle of Cadesia is not mentioned; nor is any attempt made to examine the causes of the rapid successes of the Saracen arms: it reads, indeed, more like a collection of sagas than a history. Such defects, however, do not impair its peculiar literary merit.

The 1720 play The Siege of Damascus by John Hughes drew inspiration from the first volume of the work.
