= The Fatal Constancy =

1723 play by Hildebrand Jacob

- Original language: English
- Written by: Hildebrand Jacob
- Genre: Tragedy
- Setting: Ancient Greece

Premiere
- Date: 22 April 1723
- Place: Theatre Royal, Drury Lane, London

The Fatal Constancy is a 1723 tragedy by the British writer Hildebrand Jacob. The original cast included Barton Booth as Omphales, John Mills as Zimon, Colley Cibber as Tryphon, Charles Williams as Ammon and Mary Porter as Hesione.

The play ran for five nights at the Theatre Royal, Drury Lane.

== Plot ==
In ancient Greece, a man, Ammon, is upset that his adopted sister, Hesione, whom he is in love with, is going to marry a soldier, Omphales. Ammon decides to blackmail a priest, Zimon, who is officiating the wedding of Omphales and Hesione, into delivering a bad omen that will prevent the two from marrying one another. Tryphon, Hesione's father, believes Zimon's falsehood, and refuses to let his daughter wed Omphales. Omphales leaves the city and conjures up an army of soldiers to overtake Tryphon, but is, along with his allies, defeated and killed. As a result, Hesione, who has been in a state of madness since Omphales's departure, dies. A guilty Ammon bemoans his actions.

== Influences ==
The prologue to the play states that The Fatal Constancy resembles ancient Greek drama in its structure. This rings true, as the play takes place over a 24 hour period, and all the deaths take place offstage.

== Bibliography ==
- Black, Jeremy. Culture in Eighteenth-Century England: A Subject for Taste. A&C Black, 2007. ISBN 978-1-85285-534-5.
- Burling, William J. A Checklist of New Plays and Entertainments on the London Stage, 1700-1737. Fairleigh Dickinson Univ Press, 1992. ISBN 978-0-8386-3451-6.
- Hildebrand, Jacob. The Fatal Constancy. Printed for J. Tonson at Shakespear's Head over against Katherine Street, 1723.
