= The Briton =

Play by Ambrose Philips

- Original language: English
- Written by: Ambrose Philips
- Genre: Tragedy

Premiere
- Date: 19 February 1722
- Place: Theatre Royal, Drury Lane

The Briton is a 1722 tragedy by the British writer Ambrose Philips. The play is set in pre-Roman Celtic Britain.

Performed at Drury Lane the original cast included Barton Booth as Vanoc, Robert Wilks as Ivor, John Thurmond as Didius, John Bowman as Ebranc, John Mills as Valens, Charles Williams as Alan, William Mills as Idwall, John Roberts as Messenger, Mary Porter as Cartismande and Hester Santlow as Gwendolen.

== Bibliography ==
- Burling, William J. A Checklist of New Plays and Entertainments on the London Stage, 1700-1737. Fairleigh Dickinson Univ Press, 1992.
