= Caesar in Egypt =

Play by Colley Cibber

- Written by: Colley Cibber
- Original language: English
- Genre: Tragedy

Premiere
- Date premiered: 9 December 1724
- Place premiered: Theatre Royal, Drury Lane

Caesar in Egypt is a 1724 tragedy by the British writer Colley Cibber. It is inspired by Pierre Corneille's 1642 French play The Death of Pompey about Julius Caesar's intervention in the Egyptian Civil War between Cleopatra and her brother. Cibber also incorporated elements of Plutarch and John Fletcher's The False One. The Drury Lane company invested lots of resources to make it a particularly extravagant production in the traditional style of a Restoration heroic drama.

The cast included Barton Booth as Julius Caesar, Robert Wilks as Antony, Theophilus Cibber as Ptolemy, Charles Williams as Decius, John Mills as Photinus, Colley Cibber as Achoreus, John Roberts as First Centurion, John Thurmond as Second Centurion, Mary Porter as Cornelia and Anne Oldfield as Cleopatra.

The play was not well-received, its style increasingly regarded by audiences as old-fashioned. This effectively ended Cibber's career as a playwright.

== Bibliography ==
- Burling, William J. A Checklist of New Plays and Entertainments on the London Stage, 1700-1737. Fairleigh Dickinson Univ Press, 1992.
- Koon, Helene. Colley Cibber: A Biography. University Press of Kentucky, 2014.
- Nicoll, Allardyce. History of English Drama, 1660-1900, Volume 2. Cambridge University Press, 2009.
