= Humphrey, Duke of Gloucester (play) =

1723 play

- Original language: English
- Written by: Ambrose Philips
- Genre: Tragedy

Premiere
- Date: 15 February 1723
- Place: Theatre Royal, Drury Lane

Humphrey, Duke of Gloucester is a 1723 tragedy by the British writer Ambrose Philips. It is based on the life of Humphrey, Duke of Gloucester, youngest brother of Henry V.

The original Drury Lane cast included Barton Booth as Humphrey, Duke of Gloucester, John Mills as Richard, Duke of York, John Thurmond as the Earl of Salisbury, Colley Cibber as Cardinal Henry Beaufort, Charles Williams as the Earl of Warwick, William Mills as the Duke of Buckingham, Anne Oldfield as Margaret and Mary Porter as Eleanor, Duchess of Gloucester.

== Bibliography ==
- Burling, William J. A Checklist of New Plays and Entertainments on the London Stage, 1700-1737. Fairleigh Dickinson Univ Press, 1992.
