= The Humours of Oxford =

1730 play

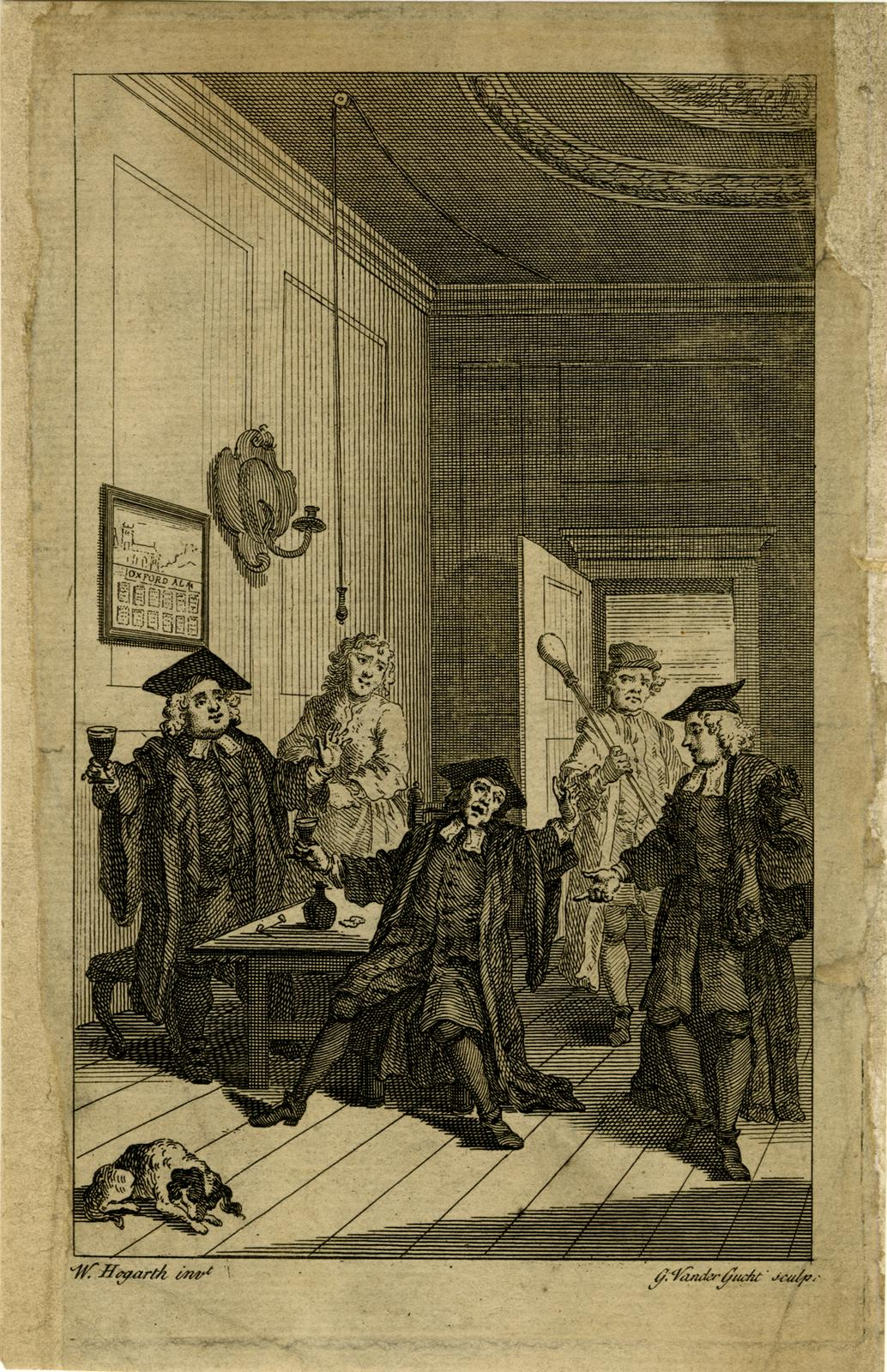
- Original language: English
- Written by: James Miller
- Genre: Comedy

Premiere
- Date: 9 January 1730
- Place: Theatre Royal, Drury Lane

The Humours of Oxford is a 1730 comedy play by the British writer James Miller. It was Miller's debut play, inspired by his time at Wadham College, and proved popular. The plot is set around Oxford University and portrays the academics as overindulging in port wine. William Hogarth designed the frontispiece of the published version of the play.

The original cast included John Mills as Colonel Truelove, Robert Wilks as Gainlove, Roger Bridgewater as Shamwell, John Harper as Haughty, Benjamin Griffin as Conundrum, Colley Cibber as Appeall, William Mills as Vice Chancellor, James Oates as Dash, Henry Norris as Timothy, John Roberts as Old Appeall and Mary Porter as Lady Science, Anne Oldfield as Clarinda and, Kitty Clive as Kitty, Hester Santlow as Victoria. The published version of the play was dedicated to the diplomat and politician Lord Chesterfield.

== Bibliography ==
- Burling, William J. A Checklist of New Plays and Entertainments on the London Stage, 1700-1737. Fairleigh Dickinson Univ Press, 1992.
- Feingold, Mordechai. History of Universities: Volume XXX / 1-2. Oxford University Press, 2017.
- Nicoll, Allardyce. History of English Drama, 1660-1900, Volume 2. Cambridge University Press, 2009.
