= Elvira (play) =

Play by David Mallet

- Original language: English
- Written by: David Mallet
- Genre: Tragedy

Premiere
- Date: 19 January 1763
- Place: Theatre Royal, Drury Lane

Elvira is a 1763 tragedy by the British writer David Mallet.

The original Drury Lane cast included David Garrick as Alonzo, Charles Holland as Don Pedro, John Hayman Packer as Don Roderigo, Susannah Maria Cibber as Elvira and Hannah Pritchard as the Queen.

== Bibliography ==
- Nicoll, Allardyce. A History of Early Eighteenth Century Drama: 1700-1750. CUP Archive, 1927.
