= Russell Street, Covent Garden =

Street in London, England

Russell Street
- 2010 view towards Covent Garden Market
- Former names: Great Russell Street (western part); Little Russell Street (eastern part)
- Namesake: Russell family, Earls and Dukes of Bedford
- Location: Covent Garden, London

Russell Street is a street in Covent Garden, London, connecting Covent Garden square with Drury Lane. It takes its name from the Russells, the Earls and Dukes of Bedford, on whose estate it was built. While its western part was formerly called Great Russell Street, the modern Great Russell Street in Bloomsbury is geographically unrelated.

Coffee-houses of Russell Street were popular as meeting places for writers, including John Dryden, Joseph Addison and Alexander Pope. At the shop of the bookseller Thomas Davies, James Boswell was first introduced to Samuel Johnson in 1763.

== History ==
The part of the street within the parish of St Paul, Covent Garden, developed under leases issued in 1631 and 1632. Its houses were occupied by about 1637. In 1708, Edward Hatton described the end next to Covent Garden as "very broad, and pleasant", and gave the street's length as 240 yards (220 m). John Strype described it in 1720 as "a fine broad street, well inhabited by tradesmen".

Before 1859, Great Russell Street extended from Covent Garden Market to Brydges Street, later Catherine Street, and Little Russell Street from Brydges Street to Drury Lane. Both parts were given the name Russell Street in 1859. In his nineteenth-century account, Edward Walford noted that the portion which skirted the northern side of Drury Lane Theatre was considerably narrower than the rest.

== Coffee-houses ==
=== Will's ===
Will's Coffee-house stood on the north side of Russell Street at the corner of Bow Street. The room in which the writers used to assemble was on the first floor. The rooms below were occupied by a shop. The coffee-house took its name from its keeper, Will Urwin, whose name appeared in an advertisement for a runaway servant in 1674.

Dryden had a particular chair to himself, which was set by the fire in winter and carried out to the balcony in summer. It was called his "winter chair" or "summer chair" accordingly. Pope was taken to Will's as a boy to see Dryden, and began to frequent it himself at seventeen, after Dryden's death.

=== Button's ===
Button's Coffee-house was established by Daniel Button about 1712, on the south side of the street. Its exact site is uncertain, but it was more or less opposite Tom's. Addison used to visit it with his friends, including Richard Steele. Pope stated that he had met Addison there nearly every day.

At Button's was the office of The Guardian. A lion's head with a large mouth was erected there in July 1713 to receive letters and papers from contributors. Under its chin was a box which contained everything that it swallowed. The head was later taken to the Shakespeare Tavern under the Covent Garden piazza, then to Richardson's Hotel, and finally to Woburn Abbey, after being bought by the Duke of Bedford.

=== Tom's ===
Tom's Coffee-house stood at No. 17, on the north side of Russell Street. It was established about 1700 by a Mr West, after whose given name it was called. In the early part of George III's reign, a club of more than 600 members was established there. Its members included David Garrick, Samuel Foote, Oliver Goldsmith and Johnson. Tom's continued to be used as a coffee-house until 1814, when it passed into other uses. The building was pulled down in 1865.

== Booksellers and residents ==
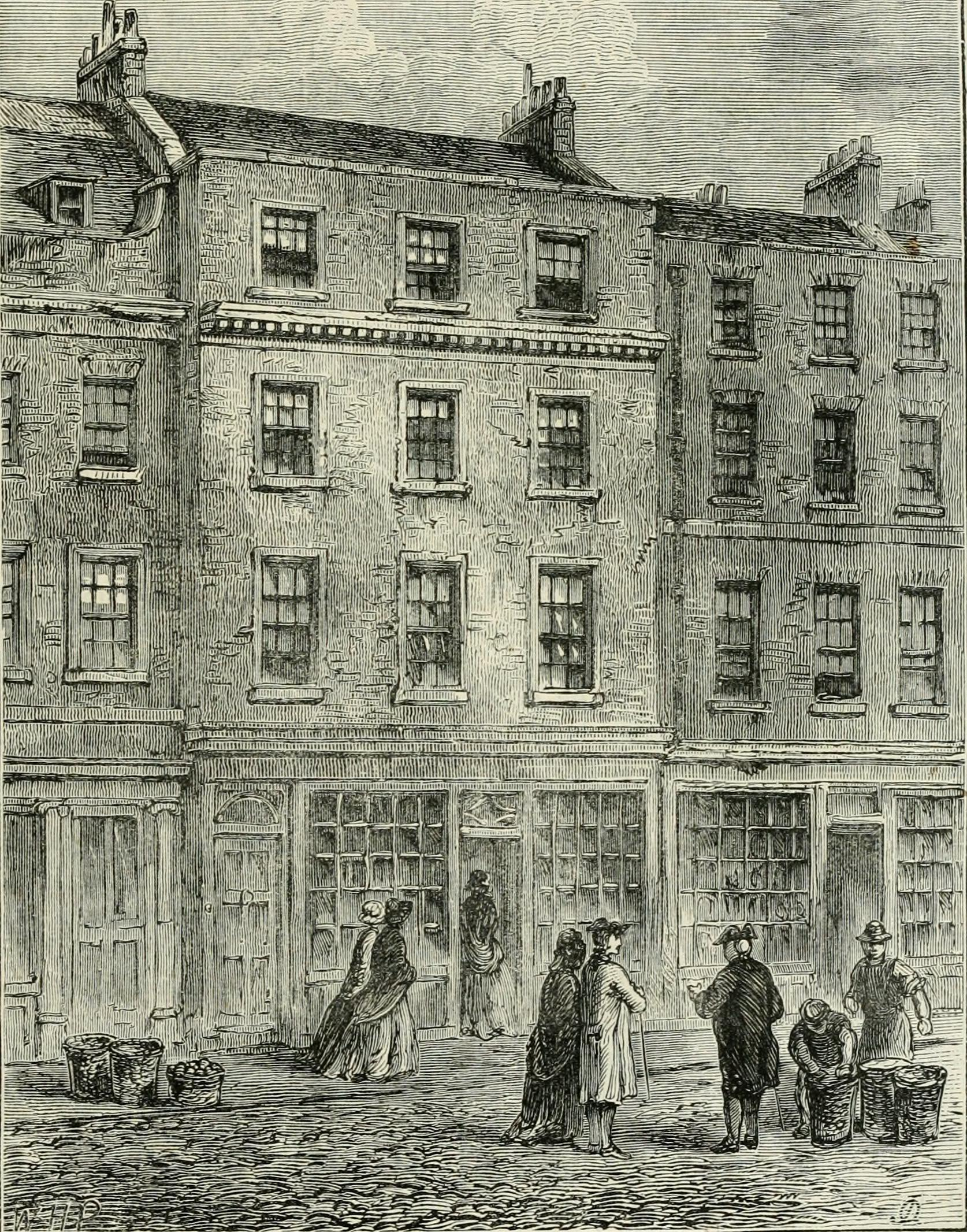
Thomas Davies's shop in Russell Street, illustrated in Old and New London.

Davies's bookshop was at No. 8, on the south side, opposite Tom's Coffee-house. He became bankrupt in 1778. On 16 May 1763, Boswell was sitting in Davies's back parlour, after drinking tea with Davies and his wife, when Johnson unexpectedly came into the shop. Davies introduced them. Boswell later wrote of the house, "I never pass by without feeling reverence and regret."

Another bookseller in Russell Street was Lewis, whom Edward Gibbon consulted in 1753 when considering conversion to Roman Catholicism. Lewis recommended him to a priest. At No. 19 was the shop of Barker, from whom Charles Lamb bought the folio edition of Beaumont and Fletcher that he recalled in his essay "Old China".

John Evelyn took lodgings at the Three Feathers for the winter of 1659–1660. Cunningham listed Robert Carr, Earl of Somerset, and the actors Joseph Taylor, Michael Mohun and Thomas Betterton among the street's residents. Betterton died in the street in 1710, and his books, prints, drawings and paintings were sold at his lodgings after his death. Mrs Barton Booth died there in 1773, and the poet John Armstrong in 1779.

Charles and Mary Lamb took rooms in October 1817 at Mr Owen's, Nos. 20 and 21 Great Russell Street, at the west corner of Bow Street. They remained until the middle of 1823. In a letter to Dorothy Wordsworth on 21 November 1817, Charles wrote, "We are in the individual spot I like best in all this great city." He described the theatres, the nearby market and the sight of a thief being conducted by a constable.

== Taverns ==
The Rose Tavern stood next to Drury Lane Theatre. William Hogarth depicted one of its rooms in A Rake's Progress. The Shakespeare's Head was another tavern in the street, where the Beefsteak Society met before moving to the Lyceum Theatre.

The Harp in Little Russell Street was a resort of actors. Walford described a club which met there, called the City of Lushington. Its members were presided over by a "Lord Mayor" and four "Aldermen", elected annually. Each member had a particular seat, called his ward, and the club held burlesque ceremonies of municipal election.
