= The Guardian (1713) =

British newspaper (London; 12 March to 1 October 1713)

- Founder: Richard Steele
- Founded: 12 March 1713
- Ceased publication: 1 October 1713

The Guardian was a short-lived newspaper published in London from 12 March to 1 October 1713.

It was founded by Richard Steele and featured contributions from Joseph Addison, Thomas Tickell, Alexander Pope, George Berkeley, and Ambrose Philips. Steele and Addison had previously collaborated on the Tatler and The Spectator (after which the present-day Spectator and Tatler are named).

Two of Berkeley's stories in The Guardian (numbers 35 and 38), each titled 'The Pineal Gland', constitute an early instance of philosophical speculative fiction. Armed with the device of a magic snuff that transports him to the Cartesian pineal glands of his adversaries, Berkeley's protagonist uses it “to distinguish the real from the professed sentiments of all persons of eminence in court, city, town, and country”.

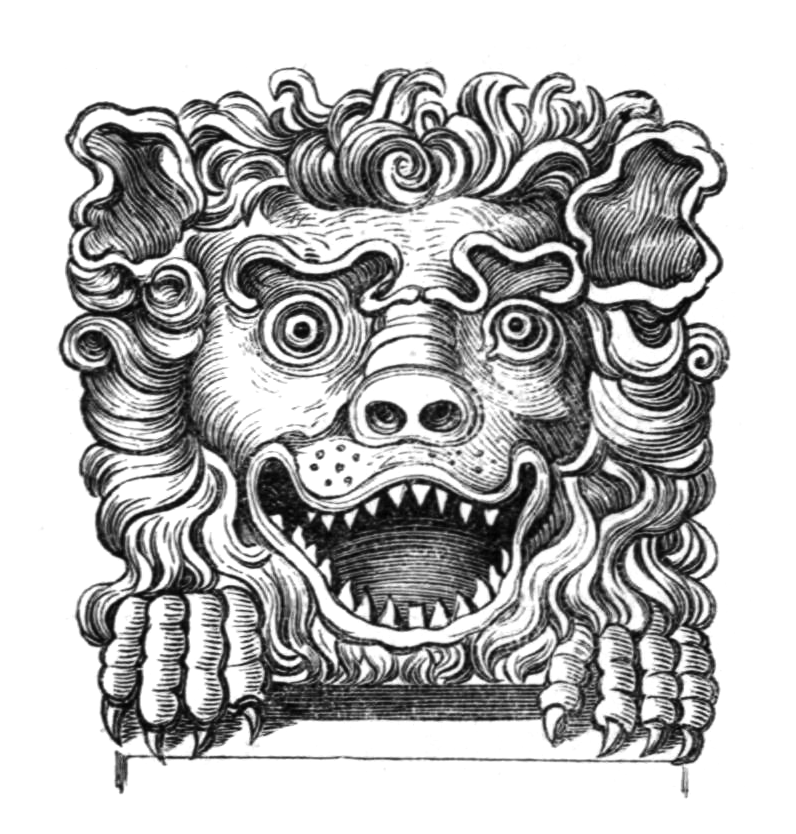
The lion's head letterbox at Button's Coffee House, used for submissions to The Guardian

Button's Coffee House in Russell Street, Covent Garden, acted as an ad hoc office for the newspaper. Contributors submitted written material in a marble lion's head letterbox, said to have been designed by the artist William Hogarth, for possible publication in The Guardian.

The Gentleman's Magazine followed on the heels of The Guardian, being touted by Richard Steele as a sequel of it.
