= The Death of Pompey =

1642 play by Pierre Corneille

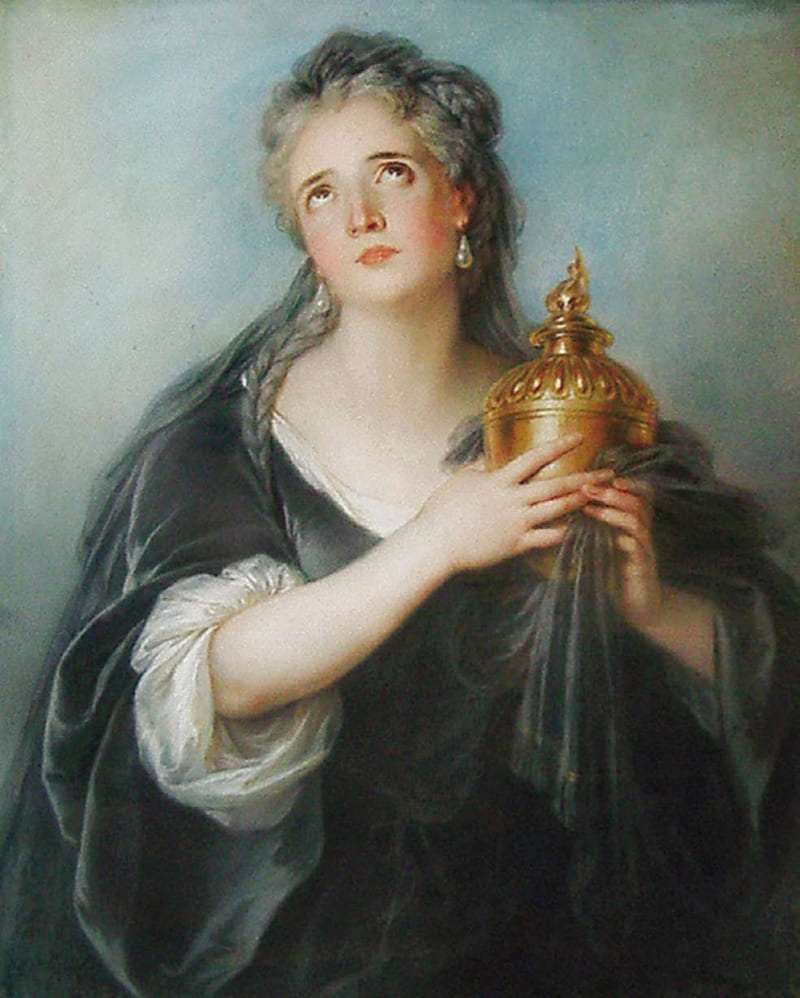
Adrienne Lecouvreur, as Cornelia in The Death of Pompey

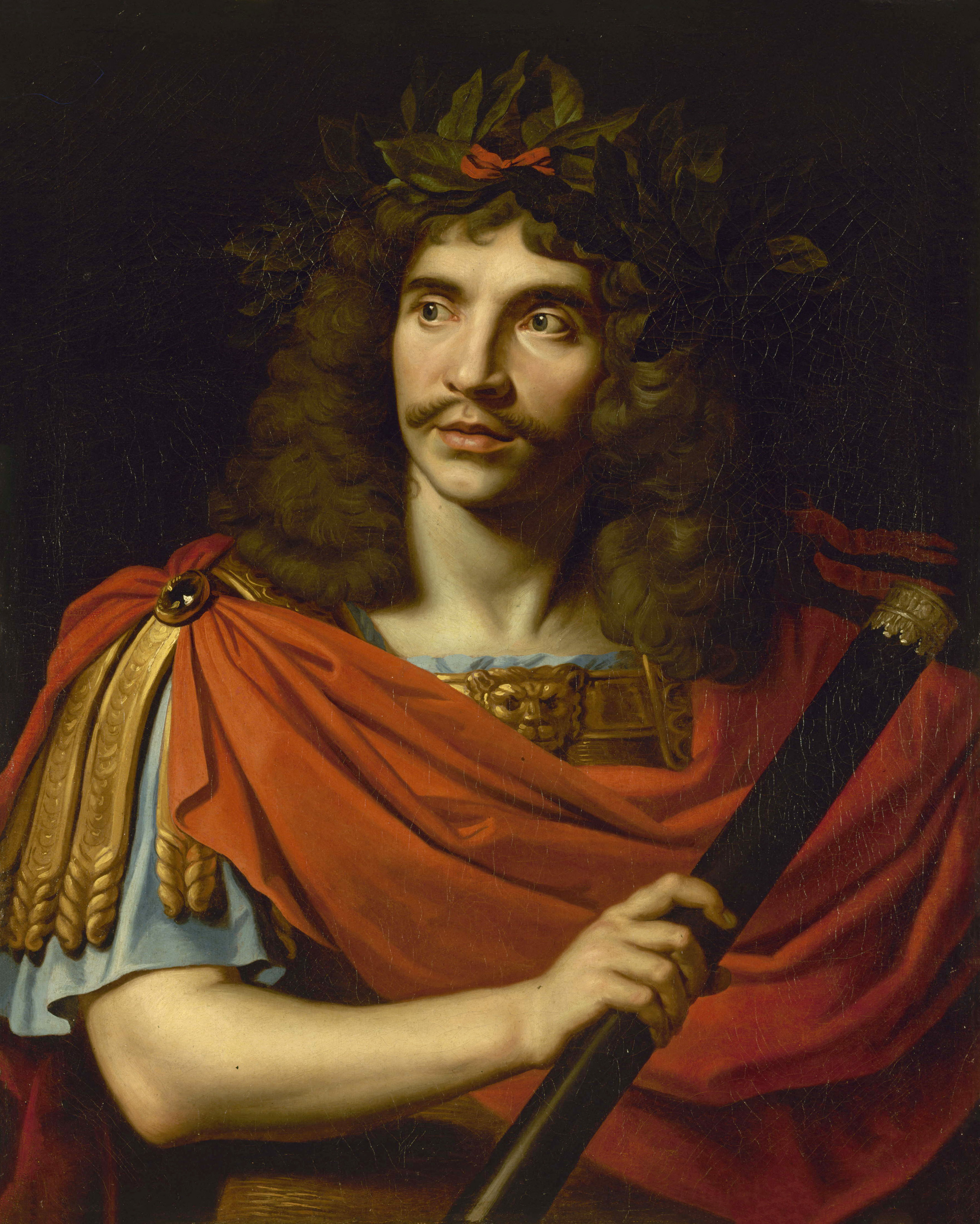
Molière as Caesar in The Death of Pompey, portrait by Nicolas Mignard

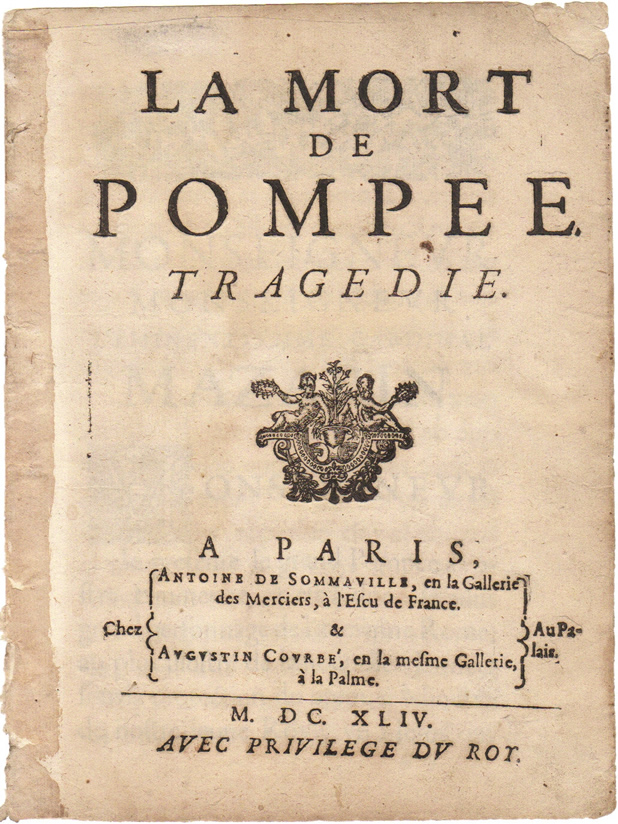
First publication of The Death of Pompey

The Death of Pompey (La Mort de Pompée) is a tragedy by the French playwright Pierre Corneille on the death of Pompey the Great. It was first performed in 1642, with Julius Caesar played by Molière. Like many of Corneille's plays, it is noted for the high tones of its heroine, Cornelia, who admits that her enemy is noble and generous but warns him when he releases her that she will continue to seek his death.

In 1724 Colley Cibber wrote an English-language play Caesar in Egypt inspired by Corneille's original. It was staged at the Theatre Royal, Drury Lane with Barton Booth as Julius Caesar and Anne Oldfield as Cleopatra.
