= The Castle of Indolence =

1748 poem by James Thomson

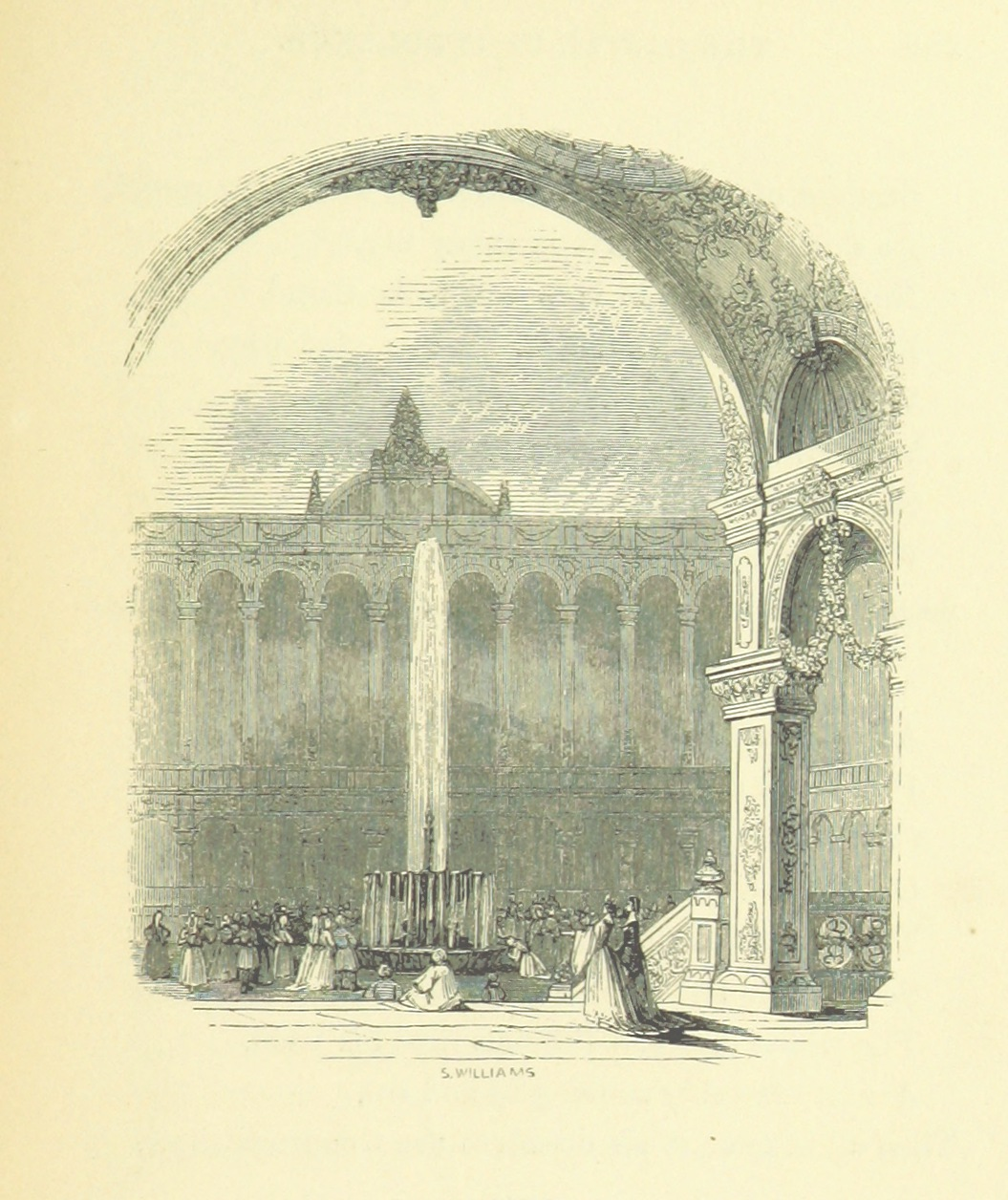
Drawing of the Castle of Indolence

The Castle of Indolence is a poem written by James Thomson, a Scottish poet of the 18th century, in 1748.

According to the Nuttall Encyclopedia, the Castle of Indolence is "a place in which the dwellers live amid luxurious delights, to the enervation of soul and body." The poem is written in Spenserian stanzas at a time when they were considered outdated and initiated an interest in this stanza form which would later have a strong influence upon the English Romantic poets Lord Byron, William Wordsworth, and John Keats.

== Influence ==
Washington Irving quotes four lines from Canto I, VI from the poem in his tale "The Legend of Sleepy Hollow", using them to open the story and set the scene:

A pleasing land of drowsy-hed it was,
Of dreams that wave before the half-shut eye;
And of gay castles in the clouds that pass,
Forever flushing round a summer-sky.

Lines from Canto I, XXX are used as the epigraph to Chapter XIII of Ann Radcliffe's The Mysteries of Udolpho.

Thomas De Quincey cites from Thomson in Confessions of an English Opium-Eater, laced into his description of sitting fireside upon a wintry evening:

And at the doors and windows seem to call,
As heav'n and earth they would together mell;
Yet the least entrance find they none at all;
Whence sweeter grows our rest secure in massy hall.
