= Cyrus the Great (play) =

1695 play by British playwright John Banks

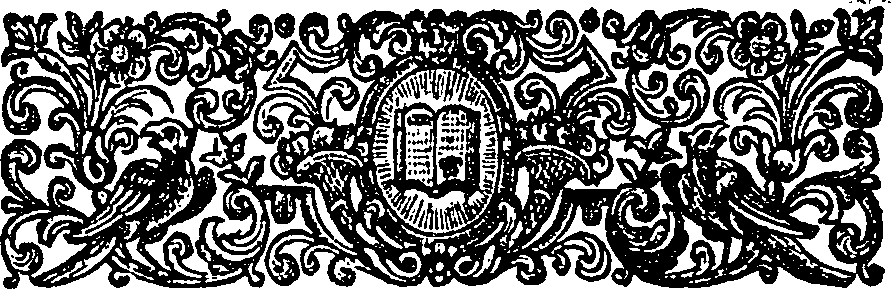
- Original language: English
- Written by: John Banks
- Genre: Tragedy

Premiere
- Date: December 1695
- Place: Lincoln's Inn Fields Theatre

Cyrus the Great is a 1695 tragedy by the British writer John Banks. It was his final work, although his earlier The Island Queens was staged several years later. Set at the court of the Persian Emperor Cyrus the Great, it was staged by Thomas Betterton's Company having previously been rejected by the United Company. John Downes described it as one of the "principal new plays" of the decade, although it did not enjoy many performances on stage.

The original cast included Thomas Smith as Cyaxeres, Edward Kynaston as Hystaspes, John Bowman as Craesus, John Thurmond as Artabasus, Elizabeth Barry as Panthea and Anne Bracegirdle as Lausaria. The play used the innovation of casting Barry as the romantic object of Cyrus' love, while Bracegirdle is besotted with him and driven to distraction by his rejection.

== Bibliography ==
- Howe, Elizabeth. The First English Actresses: Women and Drama, 1660-1700. Cambridge University Press, 1992.
- Lowerre, Kathryn. Music and Musicians on the London Stage, 1695-1705. Routledge, 2017.
- Milhous, Judith. Thomas Betterton and the Management of Lincoln's Inn Fields, 1695-1708. Southern Illinois University Press, 1979.
