= William Bayne (1858–1922) =

- Born: 13 April 1858; Edinburgh, Scotland
- Died: 17 November 1922 (aged 64); Fife, Scotland
- Occupations: Writer; art historian; biographer
- Writing career
- Genres: Non-fiction, biography, art history

William Bayne (1858–1922) was a writer and a lecturer at Dundee Training College. He was born on 13 April 1858 at Lawhead, Cameron in Fife. His father was Thomas Bayne, a shoemaker, and his mother Ann Robertson. He died unmarried at Radernie, Cameron on 17 November 1922, aged 64.

== Publications ==
- James Thomson, Edinburgh: Oliphant, Anderson and Ferrier, 1898, ("Famous Scots Series").
- Poems, by James Thomson, ed. by William Bayne, London : Walter Scott Publishing Co., [1900], (Series: The Canterbury poets).
- Sir David Wilkie R. A., (Illustrated with twenty plates, etc.), London : Walter Scott Publishing Co., 1903, (Series: The makers of British art).

== Sources ==
- Births and deaths information available at the General Register Office for Scotland, Scotlands People Centre in Edinburgh, and also at http://scotlandspeople.gov.uk
- British Library catalogue: http://www.bl.uk
- http://openlibrary.org
- http://worldcat.org
