= Hob's Wedding =

1720 play

- Written by: John Leigh
- Original language: English
- Genre: Comedy

Premiere
- Date premiered: 11 January 1720
- Place premiered: Lincoln's Inn Fields Theatre

Hob's Wedding is a 1720 farce by the Irish writer John Leigh.

An afterpiece, it premiered at the Lincoln's Inn Fields Theatre in support of the comedy The Half Pay Officers by Charles Molloy. The original cast included William Bullock as Sir Thomas Testy, John Egleton as Woodville, Richard Diggs as Truelove, John Harper as Old Hob, James Spiller as Young Hob and Jane Rogers as Mary.

== Bibliography ==
- Burling, William J. A Checklist of New Plays and Entertainments on the London Stage, 1700-1737. Fairleigh Dickinson Univ Press, 1992.
- Nicoll, Allardyce. A History of Early Eighteenth Century Drama: 1700-1750. CUP Archive, 1927.
