= The Perplexed Couple =

1715 play

- Original language: English
- Written by: Charles Molloy
- Genre: Comedy

Premiere
- Date: 16 February 1715
- Place: Lincoln's Inn Fields Theatre

The Perplexed Couple is a 1715 comedy play by the Irish writer Charles Molloy.

The original Lincoln's Inn Fields cast included George Pack as Sir Anthony Thinwit, William Bullock as Morecraft, Benjamin Griffin as Sterling, John Leigh as Octavio, James Spiller as Crispin, Letitia Cross as Leonora, Frances Maria Knight as Lady Thinwit and Elizabeth Spiller as Isbel.

== Bibliography ==
- Burling, William J. A Checklist of New Plays and Entertainments on the London Stage, 1700-1737. Fairleigh Dickinson Univ Press, 1992.
- Nicoll, Allardyce. A History of Early Eighteenth Century Drama: 1700-1750. CUP Archive, 1927.
