= The Coquet =

Play by Charles Molloy

- Original language: English
- Written by: Charles Molloy
- Genre: Comedy

Premiere
- Date: 19 April 1718
- Place: Lincoln's Inn Fields Theatre

The Coquet, or the English Chevalier is a 1718 comedy play by the Irish writer Charles Molloy.

Staged at the Lincoln's Inn Fields Theatre the original cast included Lacy Ryan as Bellamy, Benjamin Griffin as Monsieur Caprice, John Leigh as Valere, Christopher Bullock as Le Bronze, Richard Diggs as Leander, James Spiller as Ranger, John Egleton as Le Grange, George Pack as Madame Filette, Elizabeth Spiller as Mademoiselle Fantast, Jane Egleton as Le Jupe and Sarah Thurmond as Julia.

== Bibliography ==
- Burling, William J. A Checklist of New Plays and Entertainments on the London Stage, 1700-1737. Fairleigh Dickinson Univ Press, 1992.
- Nicoll, Allardyce. A History of Early Eighteenth Century Drama: 1700-1750. CUP Archive, 1927.
