= Love in a Forest =

1723 play

- Written by: Charles Johnson
- Original language: English
- Genre: Comedy

Premiere
- Date premiered: 9 January 1723
- Place premiered: Theatre Royal, Drury Lane

Love in a Forest is a 1723 comedy play by Charles Johnson. It is a substantial reworking of Shakespeare's As You Like It cutting out characters and passages, while borrowing from other Shakespeare plays amongst other things.

The original Drury Lane cast included Charles Williams as Duke Frederick, Barton Booth as Alberto, Colley Cibber as Jacques, John Corey as Amiens, John Thurmond as Oliver, Robert Wilks as Orlando, John Roberts as Roberto, John Mills as Adam, Theophilus Cibber as Le Beau, William Mills as Charles, Hester Santlow as Rosalind, Sarah Thurmond as Celia, William Penkethman as Pyramus, Henry Norris as Wall and Joe Miller as Thisbe.

== Bibliography ==
- Burling, William J. A Checklist of New Plays and Entertainments on the London Stage, 1700-1737. Fairleigh Dickinson Univ Press, 1992.
- Lynch, Stephen J. As You Like it: A Guide to the Play. Greenwood Publishing Group, 2003.
- Nicoll, Allardyce. History of English Drama, 1660-1900, Volume 2. Cambridge University Press, 2009.
