= Rinaldo and Armida (play) =

1698 play

- Original language: English
- Written by: John Dennis
- Genre: Tragedy

Premiere
- Date: November 1698
- Place: Lincoln's Inn Fields Theatre, London

Rinaldo and Armida is a 1698 tragedy by the English writer John Dennis. A semi-opera it featured music composed by John Eccles. It is inspired by the 1560 epic poem Jerusalem Delivered by the Italian writer Torquato Tasso, particularly the characters of Rinaldo and Armida.

It was performed at Lincoln's Inn Fields Theatre in London by Thomas Betterton's company. The original cast included Betterton as Rinaldo, John Thurmond as Ubaldo, Elizabeth Barry as Armida, Elizabeth Bowman as Urania and Elinor Leigh as Phenissa.

== Bibliography ==
- Van Lennep, W. The London Stage, 1660-1800: Volume One, 1660-1700. Southern Illinois University Press, 1960.
