= Sophonisba (Thomson play) =

1730 play

- Original language: English
- Written by: James Thomson
- Genre: Tragedy

Premiere
- Date: 28 March 1730
- Place: Theatre Royal, Drury Lane

Sophonisba is a 1730 verse drama tragedy by the British writer James Thomson. The play is written in blank verse. It is based on the story of the Carthaginian noblewoman Sophonisba who committed suicide rather than be paraded in a Roman triumph at the end of the Second Punic War. The story has been made into a number of plays including Nathaniel Lee's restoration tragedy Sophonisba and Voltaire's later Sophonisbe.

The original Drury Lane cast included Robert Wilks as Masinissa, John Mills as Syphax, Charles Williams as Scipio, John Roberts as Narva, Roger Bridgewater as Laelius and Anne Oldfield as Sophonisba.

== Bibliography ==
- Baines, Paul & Ferarro, Julian & Rogers, Pat. The Wiley-Blackwell Encyclopedia of Eighteenth-Century Writers and Writing, 1660-1789. Wiley-Blackwell, 2011.
- Burling, William J. A Checklist of New Plays and Entertainments on the London Stage, 1700-1737. Fairleigh Dickinson Univ Press, 1992.
- Gerrard, Christine. Aaron Hill: The Muses' Projector, 1685-1750. Oxford University Press, 2003.
