= Love in a Veil =

1718 play

- Original language: English
- Written by: Richard Savage
- Genre: Comedy

Premiere
- Date: 17 June 1718
- Place: Drury Lane Theatre

Love in a Veil is a 1718 comedy play by the British writer Richard Savage. It was inspired by a seventeenth century play by the Spanish writer Pedro Calderón de la Barca. The cast included Charles Williams as Lorenzo, Henry Norris as Alonzo, John Mills as Sir Charles Winlove, John Thurmond as Don Philip, William Mills as Diego, Anna Maria Seymour as Leonora, Mary Willis as Fidelia and Joe Miller as Aspin.

== Bibliography ==
- Burling, William J. A Checklist of New Plays and Entertainments on the London Stage, 1700-1737. Fairleigh Dickinson Univ Press, 1992.
- Hogan, Floriana Tarantino.The Spanish Comedia and the English Comedy of Intrigue with Special Reference to Aphra Behn. Boston University, 1995.
