= The Captives (1724 play) =

Play by John Gay

- Original language: English
- Written by: John Gay
- Genre: Tragedy

Premiere
- Date: 15 January 1724
- Place: Theatre Royal, Drury Lane

The Captives is a 1724 tragedy by the British writer John Gay. The action takes place in the ancient Median Empire, following the fashion in many tragedies of the era to have oriental settings. It concerns a plot against the King, which involves his wife and two royal Persian captives.

It was staged at the Drury Lane Theatre and starred the leading actors Robert Wilks as Phraortes, Anne Oldfield as Captive, Barton Booth as Sophernes, John Mills as Hydarnes, Mary Porter as Astarbe, Charles Williams as Araxes and Roger Bridgewater as Orbasius. It enjoyed a solid run of seven performances, but the rival Lincoln's Inn Fields Theatre put on a series of popular hits such as The Recruiting Officer, The Drummer and The Double Dealer against it.

George, Prince of Wales and his wife Princess Caroline attended a performance of the play.

== Bibliography ==
- Burling, William J. A Checklist of New Plays and Entertainments on the London Stage, 1700-1737. Fairleigh Dickinson Univ Press, 1992.
- Dugaw, Dianne. "Deep Play": John Gay and the Invention of Modernity. University of Delaware Press, 2001.
- Winton, Calhoun. John Gay and the London Theatre. University Press of Kentucky, 2014.
