= Will's Coffee House =

Coordinates: 51.51280°N 0.12133°W

Will's Coffee House was one of the foremost coffeehouses in England in the decades after the Restoration. It was situated in Russell Street, at the northwest corner of Bow Street, between London and Westminster. According to the Methuen Drama Dictionary of the Theatre, it was also known as the Rose Tavern, the Russell Street Coffee House, and the Wits' Coffee House. It was founded by Will Urwin.

== Patrons ==
Will's Coffee House was the home of the Wits, centring on the figure of John Dryden. With the departure of John Dennis, William Wycherley complained in a well-known letter, "nor is Wills the Wits Coffee-House any more, since you left it, whose Society for want of yours is grown as Melancholly, that is as dull as when you left 'em a Nights, to their own Mother-Wit, their Puns, Couplets, or Quibbles...." "This place is much altered since Mr Dryden frequented it," recalled Richard Steele in The Tatler afterwards; "where you used to see songs, epigrams, and satires in the hands of every man you met, you have now only a pack of cards."

Will's is mentioned repeatedly in the diary of Samuel Pepys, who first dropped in on the evening of 3 February 1663/4:

"where Dryden the poet, I knew at Cambridge, and all the wits of the town, and Harris the player and Mr. Hoole of our College. And, had I time then, or could at other times, it will be good coming thither, for there, I perceive, is very witty and pleasant discourse".

Jonathan Swift, for his part, did not recall it so positively: "And indeed the worst conversation I ever remember to have heard in my life was that at Will's coffee-house, where the wits (as they were called) used formerly to assemble."

From their first appearance in London, coffeehouses were centres of sociability, each one frequented by certain professions, a centre of communication for news and information. At Will's gathered those gentlemen of no profession at all and circulated their scurrilous epigrams and satires, and criticized the latest productions on stage or in print.

== Decline ==
After Dryden's death (May 1700), the reputation of Will's declined rapidly, though it is noted in Daniel Defoe's Journey Through England. Though in the first number of The Tatler, poetry was promised under the heading Will's Coffee-house, it was severely reviewed by Richard Steele in The Tatler, 8 April 1709, and fashion soon passed to Button's Coffee House across the way, where Joseph Addison established Daniel Button in business, about 1712.
