= Mustapha (1739 play) =

1739 play

- Written by: David Mallet
- Original language: English
- Genre: Tragedy

Premiere
- Date premiered: 13 February 1739
- Place premiered: Theatre Royal, Drury Lane

Mustapha is a 1739 tragedy by the British writer David Mallet. It is based on Mustafa, the son of Ottoman ruler Suleiman the Magnificent.

The original cast included James Quin as Solyman, William Milward as Mustapha, Thomas Wright as Zanger, William Mills as Rustan, Richard Winstone as Mufti, William Havard as Achmet, Elizabeth Barry as Roxalana and Anna Marcella Giffard as Emira. The prologue was written by Mallet's friend James Thomson. The play was dedicated to Frederick, Prince of Wales who had become a popular symbol of the Patriot Whigs including Mallet and Thomson.

== Bibliography ==
- Baines, Paul & Ferarro, Julian & Rogers, Pat. The Wiley-Blackwell Encyclopedia of Eighteenth-Century Writers and Writing, 1660-1789. Wiley-Blackwell, 2011.
- Jung, Sandro. David Mallet, Anglo-Scot: Poetry, Patronage, and Politics in the Age of Union. Associated University Press, 2008.
- Nicoll, Allardyce. A History of Early Eighteenth Century Drama: 1700-1750. CUP Archive, 1927.
