= Button's Coffee House =

Historical coffee house in London

Coordinates: 51.51235°N 0.12170°W

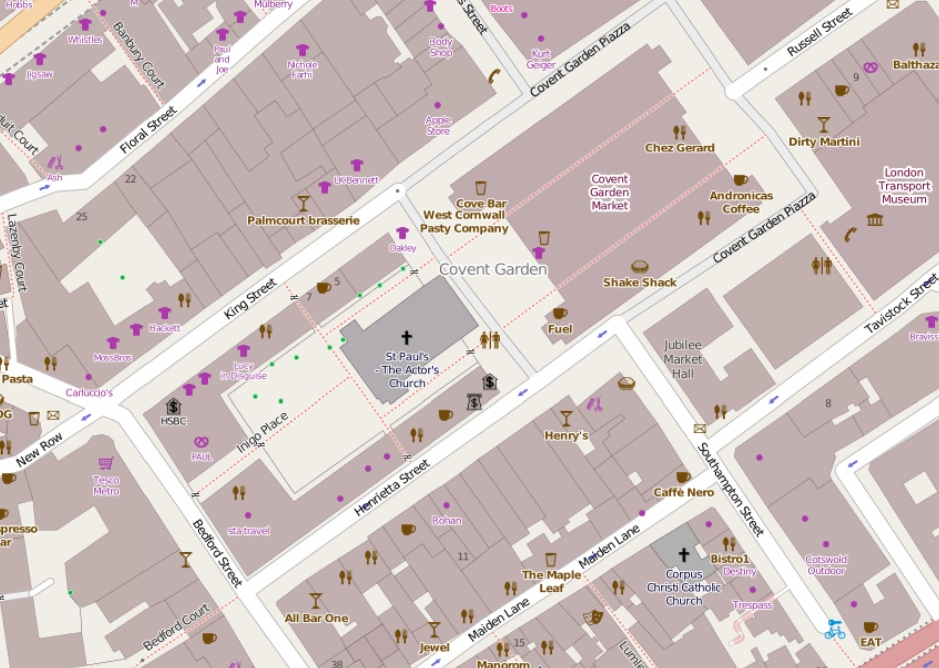
Location of Button's Coffee House in Covent Garden (top right, marked with a coffee cup).

Button's Coffee House was an 18th-century coffeehouse in London, England. It was situated in Russell Street, Covent Garden, between the City and Westminster.

== History ==
The earlier Will's Coffee House was badly reviewed by Richard Steele in The Tatler on 8 April 1709 and this helped to see the rise of Button's Coffee House nearby. The essayist Joseph Addison established Daniel Button in business, about 1712. Button was a former servant in the Countess of Warwick's household.

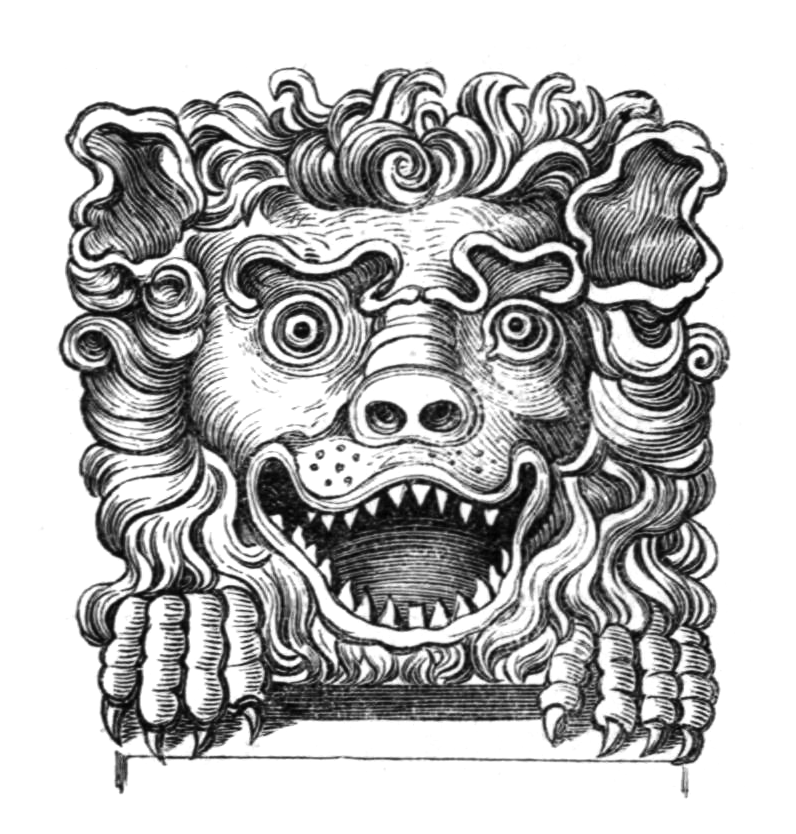
The lion's head letterbox at Button's Coffee House.

The coffee house was known for a white marble letterbox in the form of a lion's head, thought to have been designed by the artist William Hogarth. An inscription read "Cervantur magnis isti cervicibus ungues: Non nisi delictâ pasciture ille ferâ." meaning "Those talons are kept for mighty necks: He feeds only on the beast of his choice." People submitted written material in the lion's mouth for possible publication in Addison's weekly 1713 newspaper The Guardian.

Customers at the coffee house included Joseph Addison, Ambrose Philips, Alexander Pope, and Thomas Tickell – involved with The Guardian newspaper – as well as John Arbuthnot, Martin Folkes, and Jonathan Swift.

Daniel Button died in 1730 and his coffee house eventually closed in 1751. The lion's head was moved to the Shakespeare Tavern and then various other several establishments before the Duke of Bedford acquired it for his country house, Woburn Abbey. The premises were subsequently operated as a cheese shop, first by Mr and Mrs Hall and then Mr and Mrs Crisp. From 1786 to 1788 actor and author Elizabeth Inchbald lodged here.

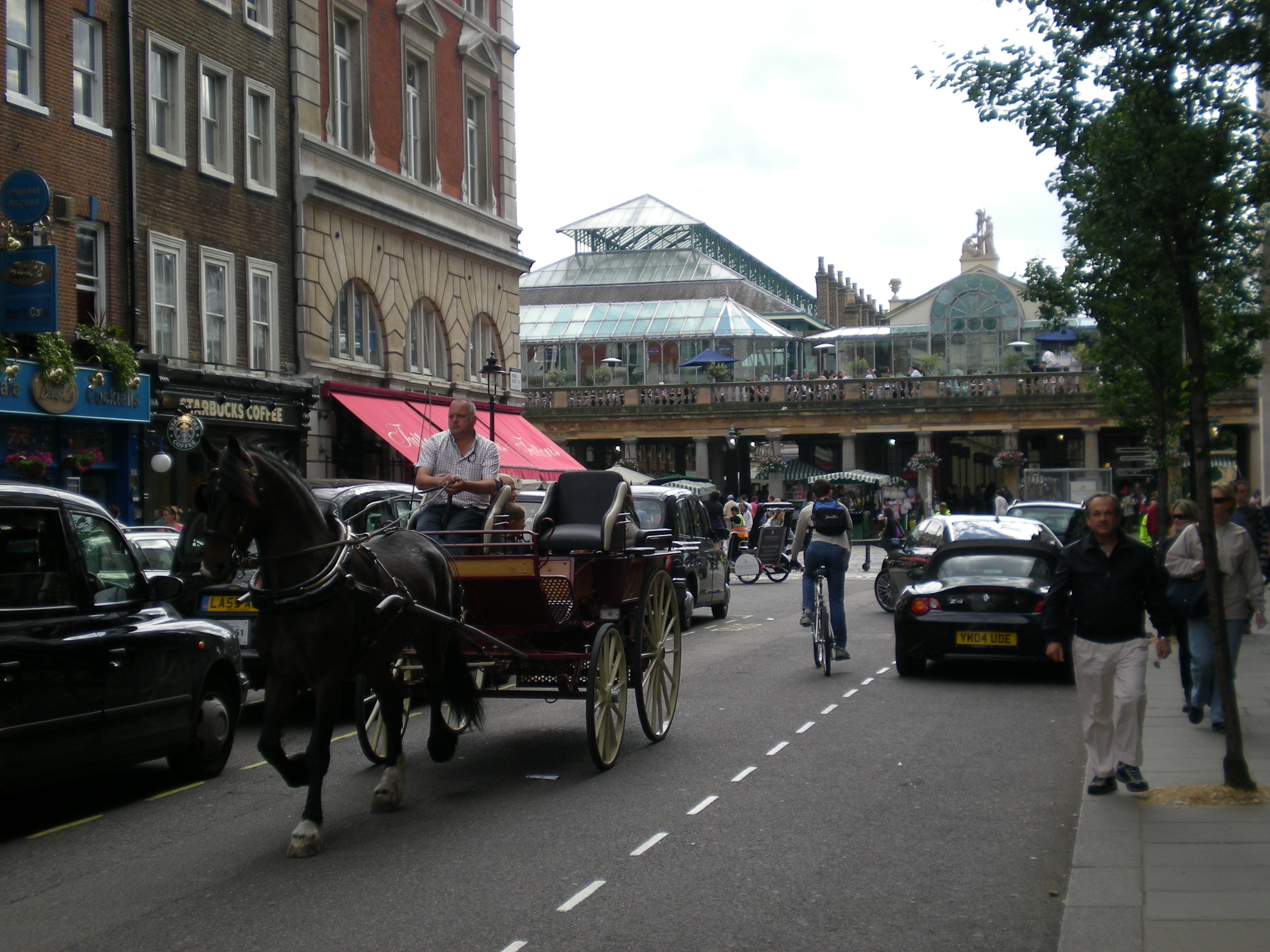
View in Russell Street, including the Starbucks coffee shop on the left where Button's Coffee House was located.

The location is now a Starbucks coffee shop at 10 Russell Street, to the east of the Covent Garden Market and south of the Royal Opera House. The Button's marble lion head was on the wall near where the Starbucks community notice board is now located.

== See also ==
- English coffeehouses in the 17th and 18th centuries
- Will's Coffee House
