= The Siege of Damascus =

1720 play

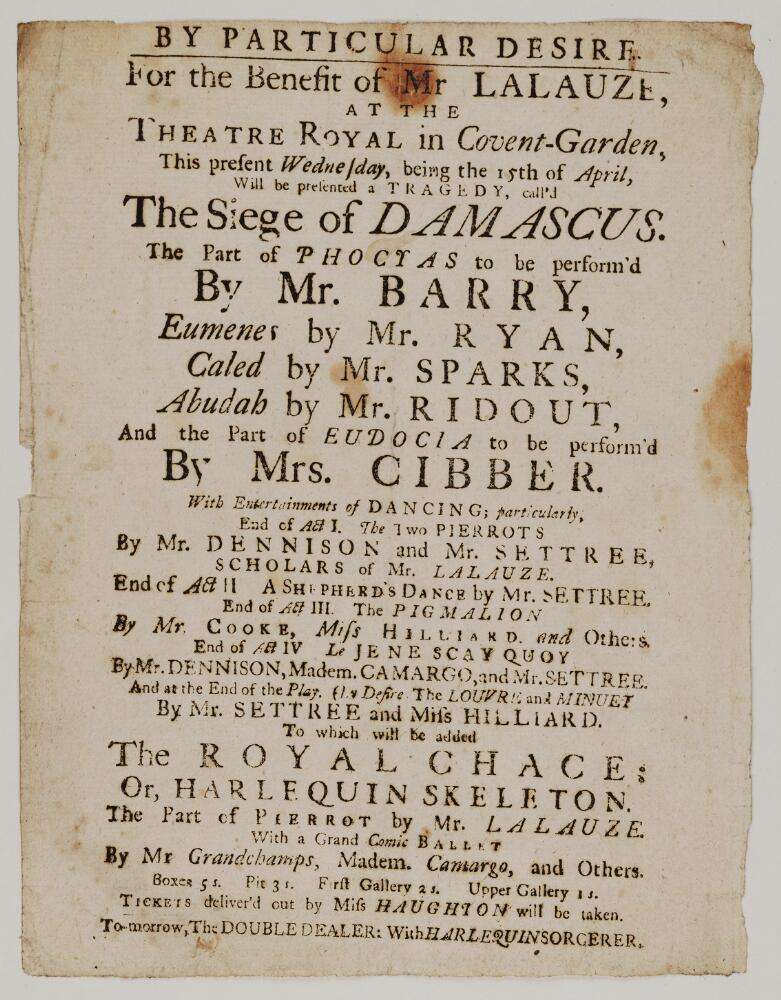
- 1747 playbill
- Original language: English
- Written by: John Hughes
- Genre: Tragedy

Premiere
- Date: 17 February 1720
- Place: Drury Lane Theatre

The Siege of Damascus is a 1720 tragedy by the British writer John Hughes. It was inspired by Simon Ockley's 1708 study Conquest of Syria, and focuses specifically on the Siege of Damascus in 634.

Originally staged at the Theatre Royal, Drury Lane with a cast featuring Robert Wilks as Eumenes, Thomas Walker as Daran, Barton Booth as Phocyas, John Mills as Caled, Mary Porter as Eudocia, Charles Williams as Herbis, William Mills as Artaman and John Thurmond as Abudah. it was a success and was revived frequently in the eighteenth century. It was his final work as he died shortly after its premiere.

== Bibliography ==
- Burling, William J. A Checklist of New Plays and Entertainments on the London Stage, 1700-1737. Fairleigh Dickinson Univ Press, 1992.
- Orr, Bridget. British Enlightenment Theatre: Dramatizing Difference. Cambridge University Press, 2020.
