= David Mallet (writer) =

Scottish poet and dramatist

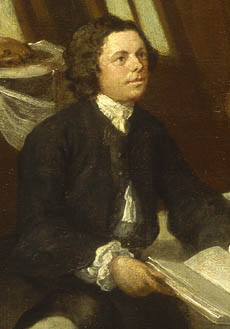
Portrait, thought to be Mallet, by Hogarth, 1745

David Mallet (or Malloch) (c. 1705–1765) was a Scottish poet and dramatist.

He was educated at the University of Edinburgh, and went to London in 1723 to work as a private tutor. There he became friendly with Alexander Pope, James Thomson, and other literary figures including Henry St John, Viscount Bolingbroke.

His best-known work was written in the same year: William and Margaret, adapted from a traditional ballad. In 1740, he collaborated with Thomson on a masque, Alfred, which was the vehicle for "Rule, Britannia!". His other plays and poetry (e.g. Amyntor and Theodora), popular at the time, are largely forgotten, but Bolingbroke's writings were edited and published by Mallet in 1754.

== Life ==
Mallet was probably the second son of James Malloch of Dunruchan, a well-to-do tenant farmer on Lord Drummond's Perthshire estate, a Roman Catholic, and a member of the outlawed Clan MacGregor. The household suffered during the Jacobite Rebellion of 1715. Mallet gave his age as 28 in 1733, and was therefore born about 1705. He seems to have been educated at the parish school of Crieff under John Ker.

In 1717 Mallet was acting as janitor in Edinburgh High School. In 1720 he became resident tutor to the sons of Mr. Home of Dreghorn; he held the post till 1723, studied at the same time at the University of Edinburgh (1721–2, 1722–3), and formed a friendship with a fellow student, James Thomson the poet, a future collaborator. In July 1723 he accepted the post of tutor to the sons of the Duke of Montrose. Leaving the university without a degree, he went in August to London, and then to the duke's seat at Shawford, near Winchester. He lived with the family until 1731, mainly in London and Shawford. In 1726 he received the honorary degree of M.A. from the University of Aberdeen, ostensibly for an English poem in imitation of Ker's Donaides. Early in 1727 he made a continental tour with his pupils. Towards the end of 1731 he left the Montrose family, and went to Gosfield in Essex, to act as tutor to the stepson of John Knight, to whose wife, formerly Mrs. Newsham, he had been recommended by Alexander Pope.

On 2 November 1733 Mallet, with his pupil, matriculated at St. Mary Hall, Oxford, where he resided fairly regularly till 27 September 1734. On 5 March 1735 he received, at his request, the degree of M.A. from the University of Edinburgh, and on the 15th of that month he graduated B.A., and on 6 April M.A. of the University of Oxford. He was again abroad in 1735.

Mallet came into favour with the opposition, and was appointed, 27 May 1742, under-secretary to the Prince of Wales. In 1745 he made a tour in Holland.

Mallet was rewarded in 1763 by Lord Bute, to whom he had given fulsome praise, with the post of inspector of exchequer-book in the outports of London, a sinecure which he held till his death. In the autumn of the following year he joined his wife Lucy in Paris, but ill health compelled him to return to London. He died on Sunday, 21 April 1765 and was buried on 27 April in St. George's cemetery, South Audley Street.

== Works ==
Mallet published a Pastoral in the Edinburgh Miscellany in 1720; and during his college days produced a number of short pieces, including an imitation of John Milton entitled The Transfiguration, first published in the Edinburgh Magazine in 1793. Shortly before his engagement with the Montrose family he composed the ballad of William and Margaret which was published first anonymously in black letter, and then in 1724, in Allan Ramsay's Tea-Table Miscellany, and Aaron Hill's Plain Dealer No. 36. Further poems followed, mostly written for John Ker; and in February 1725 he wrote verses on Mira, the Clio of his friend Thomson. For Thomson's poem on Winter, published in March 1726, he wrote a dedication to Sir Spencer Compton, and some verses for the second edition He had himself written, early in 1725, a poem on the same subject, which was praised by Thomson; and on his return from the continent he prepared for the press The Excursion, in two books, which he had written in 1726.

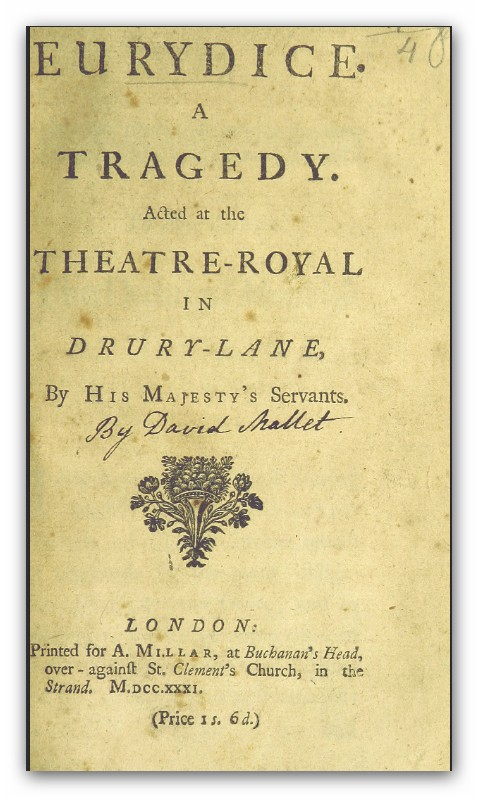

On 22 February 1731 Mallet produced his tragedy of Eurydice at Drury Lane, with a prologue and epilogue by Aaron Hill. It was acted about thirteen times, and was revived in 1759. Mallet showed his appreciation for Pope with his poem on Verbal Criticism (1733), in which he ridiculed Lewis Theobald.

Mallet made more of a reputation with the tragedy of Mustapha, produced at Drury Lane on 13 Feb. 1738–9. The prologue was by Thomson, and the play was dedicated to Frederick, Prince of Wales: like Thomson's Edward and Eleonora, but less openly, it was directed against the king and Sir Robert Walpole. With James Quin as Solyman, it ran for fourteen nights. In 1740 Mallet published a short Life of Bacon; shortly afterwards Mallet and Thomson were commanded by the Prince to write the masque of Alfred, to celebrate both the birthday of the Princess Augusta and the anniversary of George I's accession. It was played in the gardens of Cliefden, before the Prince and Princess of Wales, on Friday, 1 August 1740, with Quin, Christiana Horton, and Kitty Clive in the leading parts.

Sarah Churchill, Duchess of Marlborough left in 1744 the sum of £1,000 to Mallet and Richard Glover, to write a life of her husband; and Mallet, on Glover's refusal, undertook the work. He only did some research. He published, in May 1747, 'Amyntor and Theodora, or the Hermit.'

Mallet and Thomson had, through George Lyttelton, 1st Baron Lyttelton, support from the Prince of Wales, but then lost it as Lyttelton fell from favour. Mallet then found the patronage of Bolingbroke, and prepared a new edition of the Patriot King, published in 1749; in it he attacked the memory of Pope for having clandestinely edited and printed the work in 1738. There was a short pamphlet war with Pope's friends. He then edited Bolingbroke's works, 5 vols. in March 1754. Samuel Johnson remarked on this enterprise that Bolingbroke had "spent his life in charging a gun against Christianity", and "left half-a-crown to a hungry Scotchman to draw the trigger after his death".

In 1751, three years after the death of Thomson, Mallet published a new version of the masque of 1740. The adaptation was major, with new scenes and songs added. It was acted at Drury Lane on 23 February 1751, with David Garrick in the title rôle. The masque of Britannia, an appeal to patriotic sentiment on the eve of an outbreak of war with France, followed in 1755. It was produced at Drury Lane on 9 May, when Garrick spoke the prologue as a drunken sailor.

On 19 January 1763 Mallet's Elvira was acted at the same venue during the "half-price riots". Garrick took the part of Don Pedro, the last original character in which he was seen; but it provoked a pamphlet of Critical Strictures by James Boswell and two fellow Scots. In the intervening years Mallet had written lesser works, including the ballad of Edwin and Emma (1760), and a partisan indictment by a "Plain Man" against Admiral Byng in 1757. An extract from his The tragedy of Bowes appears in The Bishoprick Garland 1834 by Cuthbert Sharp.

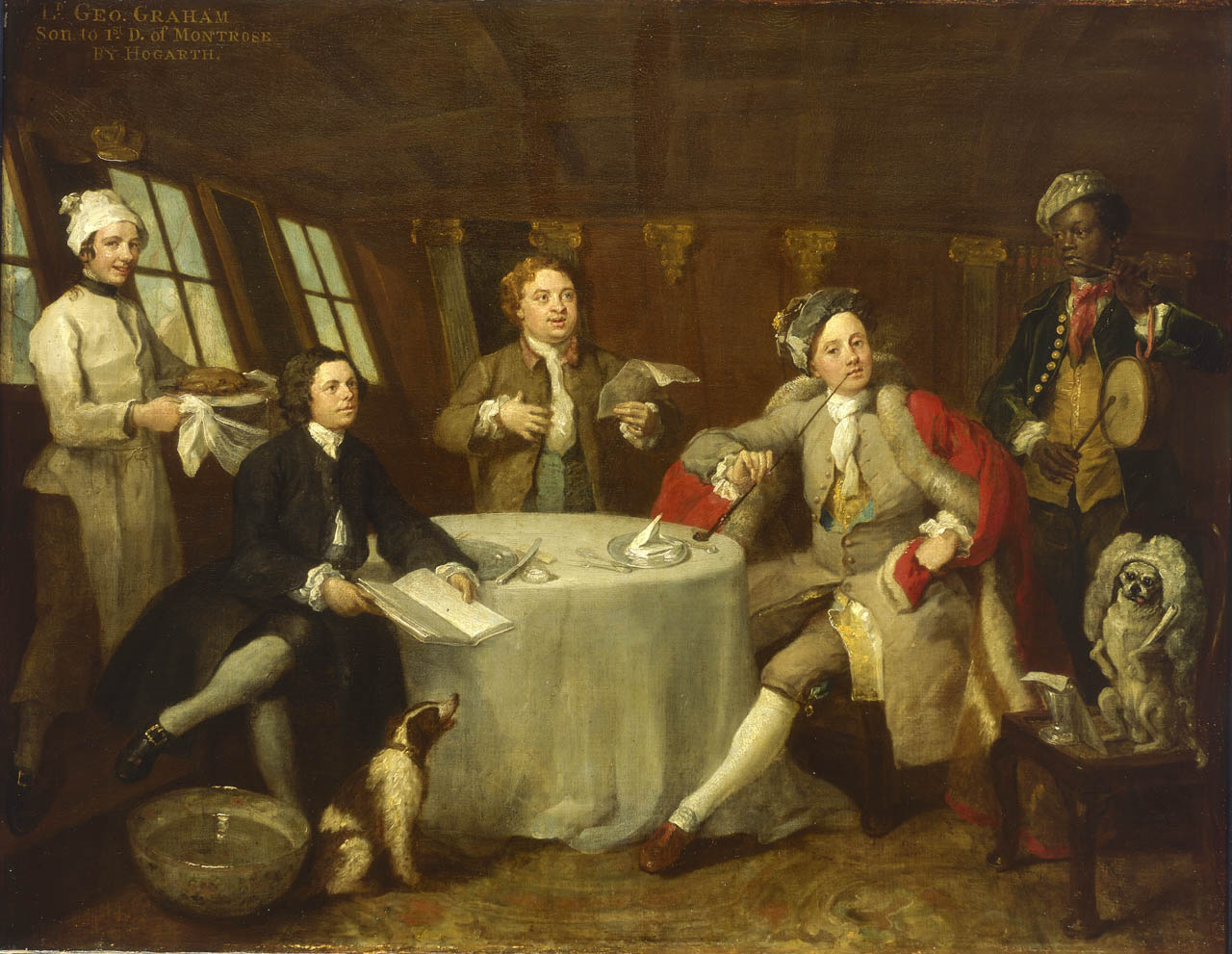
Mallet with Captain Lord George Graham, on Graham's ship the Lark, painted by William Hogarth

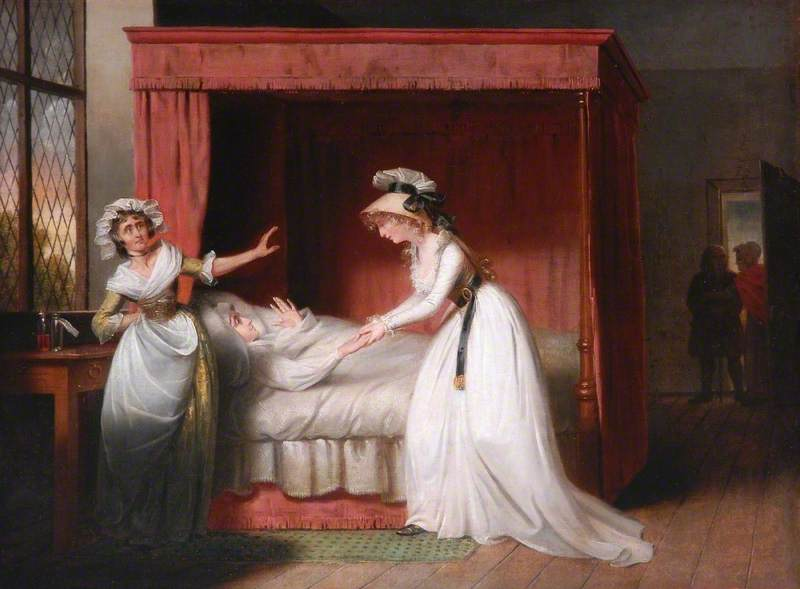
"Edwin and Emma"
