= The Half-Pay Officers =

Play by Charles Molloy

- Original language: English
- Written by: Charles Molloy
- Genre: Comedy

Premiere
- Date: 11 January 1720
- Place: Lincoln's Inn Fields Theatre

The Half-Pay Officers is a 1720 comedy play by the Irish writer Charles Molloy. The play included popular scenes from Henry V, Much Ado About Nothing and Love and Honour. It proved popular with audiences and was revived on a number of occasions. It premiered with the farce Hob's Wedding as an afterpiece.

The original cast at Lincoln's Inn Fields included Lacy Ryan as Bellayr, Benjamin Griffin as Fluellin, Christopher Bullock as Meagre, Anthony Boheme as Jaspar and John Harper as Loadham. The premiere was attended by George Prince of Wales.

== Bibliography ==
- Burling, William J. A Checklist of New Plays and Entertainments on the London Stage, 1700-1737. Fairleigh Dickinson Univ Press, 1992.
- Nicoll, Allardyce. A History of Early Eighteenth Century Drama: 1700-1750. CUP Archive, 1927.
