= Charles Molloy (journalist) =

Irish journalist and political activist

Charles Molloy (died 16 July 1767) was an Irish journalist and political activist on the Jacobite side, as well as a minor playwright.

== Life ==
The 18th century Biographia dramatica says that Molloy attended Trinity College, Dublin before moving to London and writing plays. A Compendium of Irish Biography states he "was born in Dublin early in the 18th century".

His three known plays were performed at Lincoln's Inn Fields. The Perplexed Couple (1715) and The Coquet (1718) had three-night runs, but The Half Pay Officers (1720) was a success. It ran for seven nights on its initial run and was revived several times, all the way to the 19th century. On 23 May 1764, being then a resident of St. Anne, Soho, London, he became a student of Gray's Inn.

Molloy was a passionate Jacobite, and he became active in the Jacobite wing of the Tory party from an early date. He contributed to and aided Mist's Weekly Journal (which ran from 1716 to 1728) and its successor, Fog's Weekly Journal. Mist recommended that, when he was sent into exile, Molloy take over the Weekly Journal, and Molloy was the editor for a time. In the 1730s, the "Old Pretender," James Francis Edward Stuart, knew of Molloy and wanted to recruit him to start a new journal in England to lobby for the Jacobite cause. Daniel O'Brien, the Old Pretender's Paris liaison, told Molloy that the journal would be co-edited by Alexander Pope. There is no other evidence whatever that Pope had any knowledge of, much less involvement in, such an endeavor, and, in the event Pope not only did not edit the new journal, he never once even contributed to it. Molloy wrote to the Pretender agreeing to the task, and the new journal Common Sense, or, The Englishman's Journal (which ran from 1737 to 1743) appeared. It had contributions from the Earl of Chesterfield, Baron Lyttelton, and William King, but none from Alexander Pope or the other Scriblerians.

Molloy was apparently a bachelor without issue, but he married in 1742. Molloy's friend, John Barber, died in 1741. He was immensely wealthy, and in his will he left money to Tory causes and Tory leaders, including to Jonathan Swift and Henry St John, as well as Molloy. However, the bulk of his money went to his long-time housekeeper and mistress, whom Molloy married. Since she was forty-three years old at the time, it is not surprising that the couple produced no children, but Molloy received £20,000 in her inheritance. He was probably close to her in age. She died in 1758, and he died in 1767, around seventy-three years of age. After marriage, Molloy generally ceased journalism, although he remained active for a time in Jacobite causes.

He died in Soho Square on 16 July 1767.

== Notes ==
Attribution

This article incorporates text from a publication now in the public domain: Goodwin, Gordon (1894). "Molloy, Charles (d.1767)". In Lee, Sidney (ed.). Dictionary of National Biography. Vol. 38. London: Smith, Elder & Co.
