= Hildebrand Jacob =

British poet and playwright

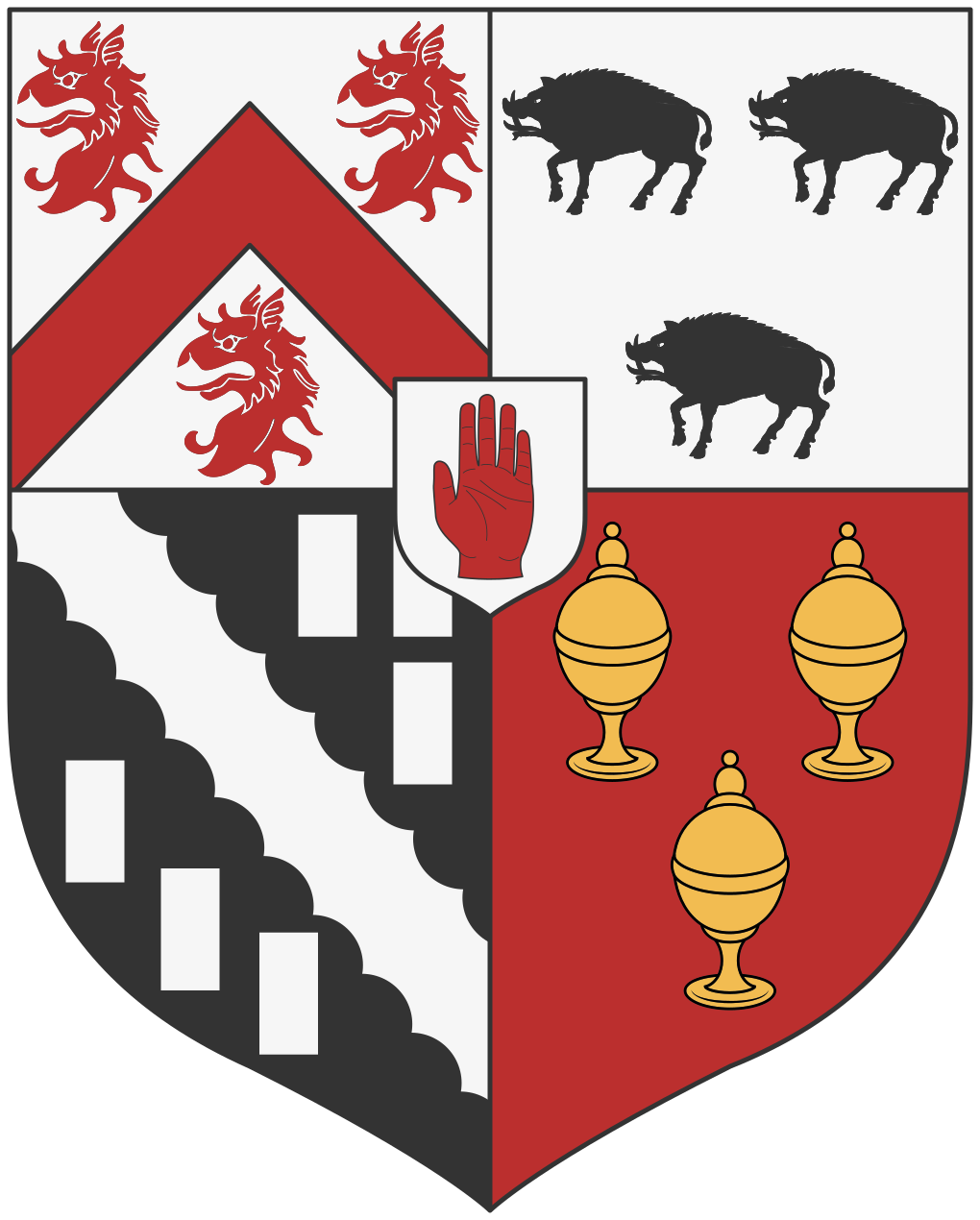
The coat of arms of Jacob of Bromley, Sir Hildebrand Jacob, 4th Bt, Baronets.

Hildebrand Jacob (1692 or 1693–1739) was a British poet and playwright, whose major works include the epic poem Brutus the Trojan and the tragic verse drama The Fatal Constancy. His collected works (entitled The Works of H. Jacob, Esqr.) were published in 1735.

== Family ==
His father was Sir John Jacob, third baronet of Bromley, Middlesex (c.1665–1740) and his mother was Dorothy (c.1662–1749). Sir John served in the army from 1685 to 1702, seeing action at the Battle of Killiecrankie and in Ireland.

Following his father, Hildebrand served in the army until at least 1715, then in 1717 he married Meriel, daughter of another baronet, Sir John Bland of Kippax-Park, Yorkshire. They had a son, also Hildebrand, and a daughter, Anne They made their home at West Wratting Park, Cambridgeshire.

He never succeeded to his father's seat, dying in 1739, a year before Sir John. His son Sir Hildebrand Jacob (1717 or 1718–1790) succeeded Sir John at his death on 31 March 1740, becoming the fourth baronet. The junior Sir Hildebrand was known as an excellent scholar, particularly of Hebrew.

== Brutus the Trojan ==
Brutus the Trojan (1735) is an epic poem about Brutus of Troy, the legendary founder of Britain, according to the histories of Nennius and Geoffrey of Monmouth.

== Plays ==
His plays included the tragedy The Fatal Constancy (1723). He also wrote comedies: The Nest of Plays (1738) comprised The Prodigal Reform'd, The Happy Constancy, and The Trial of Conjugal Love.

== Other works ==
Jacob produced a number of bawdy works, probably including The Curious Maid (1720), although this is sometimes attributed to Matthew Prior (1664–1721).

Other works include Bedlam (1723), Chiron to Achilles (1732), Hymn to the Goddess of Silence (1734), Of the sister arts: an essay (1734), The progress of religion (1737), and Donna Clara to her daughter Teresa: an epistle (1737).

== Portrait ==
The National Portrait Gallery in London has an engraving of him by Jacobus Houbraken after George Knapton (NPG D18752).
