= Simon Ockley =

British orientalist and translator

Simon Ockley (c. 1678 – 9 August 1720) was a British Orientalist.

== Biography ==
Ockley was born in Exeter. He was educated at Queens' College, Cambridge, and graduated B.A. in 1697, MA. in 1701, and B.D. in 1710. He became a fellow of Jesus College and vicar of Swavesey, and in 1711, was chosen Adams Professor of Arabic in the university. He had a large family, and his latter days were embittered by pecuniary embarrassments, which form the subject of a chapter in Isaac D'Israeli's Calamities of Authors. The preface to the second volume of his History of the Saracens is dated from Cambridge Castle, where he lay a prisoner for debt.

Ockley maintained that a knowledge of Oriental literature was essential to the proper study of theology, and in the preface to his first book, the Introductio ad linguas orientales (1706), he urges the importance of the study.

He died at Swavesey.

== Works ==
- The History of the Saracens, is his main work. It was published in two volumes, 1708–1718, and long enjoyed a great reputation; unfortunately Ockley took as his main authority a manuscript in the Bodleian of Al-Waqidi's Futúh al-Shám, which is a historical romance rather than history.
- A translation of Leon Modena's History of the Present Jews throughout the World (1707).
- The Improvement of Human Reason, exhibited in the Life of Hai Ebn Yokdhan (1708), an English translation of Hayy ibn Yaqdhan, a 12th-century philosophical novel by Ibn Tufayl.
- Translated from Arabic the Second Book of Esdras
- An Aᴄᴄᴏᴜɴᴛ of Sᴏᴜᴛʜ-Wᴇsᴛ Bᴀʀʙᴀʀʏ: ᴄᴏɴᴛᴀɪɴɪɴɢ What is most Remarkable in the Territories of the Kɪɴɢ of Fᴇᴢ and Mᴏʀᴏᴄᴄᴏ. Written by a Person who had been a Slave there a considerable Time; and Published from his Authentick Manuscript. To which are Added, Two ʟᴇᴛᴛᴇʀs: One from the Present King of Mᴏʀᴏᴄᴄᴏ to Colonel Kirk; The Other to Sir Cloudesly Shovell: With Sir Cloudesly's Answer, &c. London: Printed for J. Bowyer and H. Clements, 1713.
- Sentences of Ali son-in-law of Mahomet, and his fourth successor. Translated from an Arabic manuscript in the Bodleian library at Oxford. London, B. Lintot, 1717.
