= Benjamin Martyn =

Benjamin Martyn (1698–1763) was an English writer and government official. He served as the only secretary for the Trustees for the Establishment of the Colony of Georgia in America from 1732 to 1752. He then served as the colony’s agent for the Crown from February, 1753 until 1763.

== Literary career ==
Before he was retained by the Georgia trustees, Martyn authored a well-received tragedy, Timoleon, in 1730, an effort supported by Alexander Pope. He and Pope collaborated on an effort to erect a monument to Shakespeare. Martyn was instrumental in founding the society for the Encouragement of Learning in 1736.

Martyn was retained by Anthony Ashley Cooper, 4th Earl of Shaftesbury, a Georgia trustee, to write a biography of his great-grandfather, Anthony Ashley Cooper, 1st Earl of Shaftesbury. The 1st earl was a notable figure in seventeenth century English politics and with philosopher John Locke designed the settlement plan for the Carolina Colony.

== The Georgia trustees ==
Martyn authored several publications for the trustees on the colony, including "Some Account of the Trustees Design for the Establishment of the Colony of Georgia in America," based on a tract written by James Oglethorpe. The document contains the principles for settling the Georgia Colony, now known as the Oglethorpe Plan.
