= James Thomson (poet, born 1700) =

Scottish poet (1700–1748)

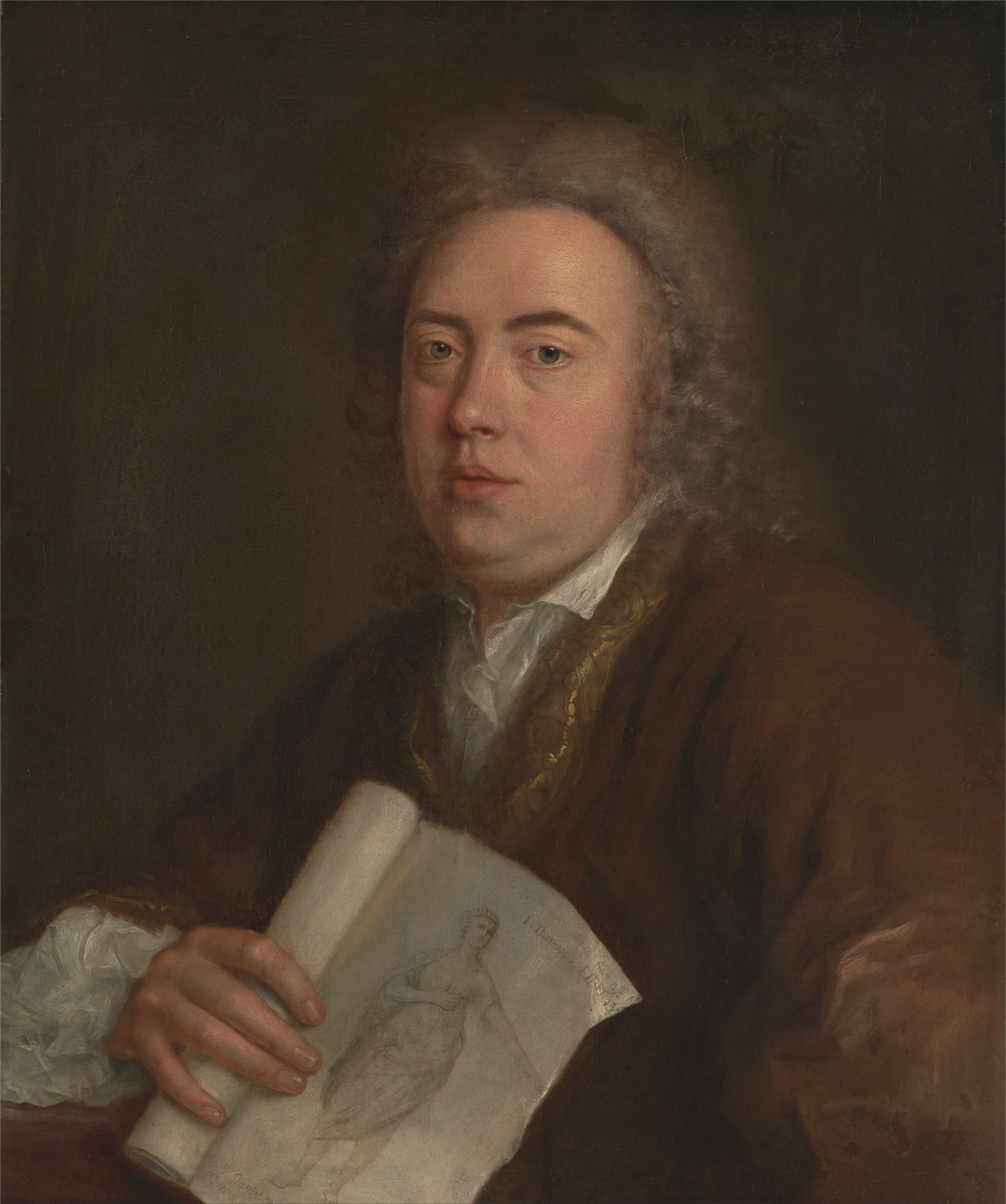
- Portrait by Stephen Slaughter, 1736
- Born: c. 11 September 1700; Ednam, Roxburghshire
- Died: 27 August 1748 (aged 47); Richmond, London
- Education: University of Edinburgh

James Thomson (c. 11 September 1700 – 27 August 1748) was a Scottish poet and playwright, known for his poems The Seasons and The Castle of Indolence, and for the lyrics of "Rule, Britannia!"

== Scotland, 1700–1725 ==
James Thomson was born in Ednam in Roxburghshire around 11 September 1700 and baptised on 15 September. He was the fourth of nine children of Thomas Thomson and Beatrix Thomson (née Trotter). Beatrix Thomson was born in Fogo, Berwickshire and was a distant relation of the house of Hume. Thomas Thomson was the Presbyterian minister of Ednam until eight weeks after Thomson's birth, when he was admitted as minister of Southdean, where Thomson spent most of his early years.

Thomson may have attended the parish school of Southdean before going to the grammar school in Jedburgh in 1712. He failed to distinguish himself there. Shiels, his earliest biographer, writes: 'far from appearing to possess a sprightly genius, [Thomson] was considered by his schoolmaster, and those which directed his education, as being really without a common share of parts'. He was, however, encouraged to write poetry by Robert Riccaltoun (1691–1769), a farmer, poet and Presbyterian minister; and Sir William Bennet (d. 1729), a whig laird who was a patron of Allan Ramsay. While some early poems by Thomson survive, he burned most of them on New Year's Day each year.

Thomson entered the College of Edinburgh in autumn 1715, destined for the Presbyterian ministry. At Edinburgh he studied metaphysics, Logic, Ethics, Greek, Latin and Natural Philosophy. He completed his arts course in 1719 but chose not to graduate, instead entering Divinity Hall to become a minister. In 1716 Thomas Thomson died, with local legend saying that he was killed while performing an exorcism. At Edinburgh Thomson became a member of the Grotesque Club, a literary group, and he met his lifelong friend David Mallet. After the successful publication of some of his poems in the "Edinburgh Miscellany" Thomson followed Mallet to London in February 1725 in an effort to publish his verse.

== London, 1725–1727 ==
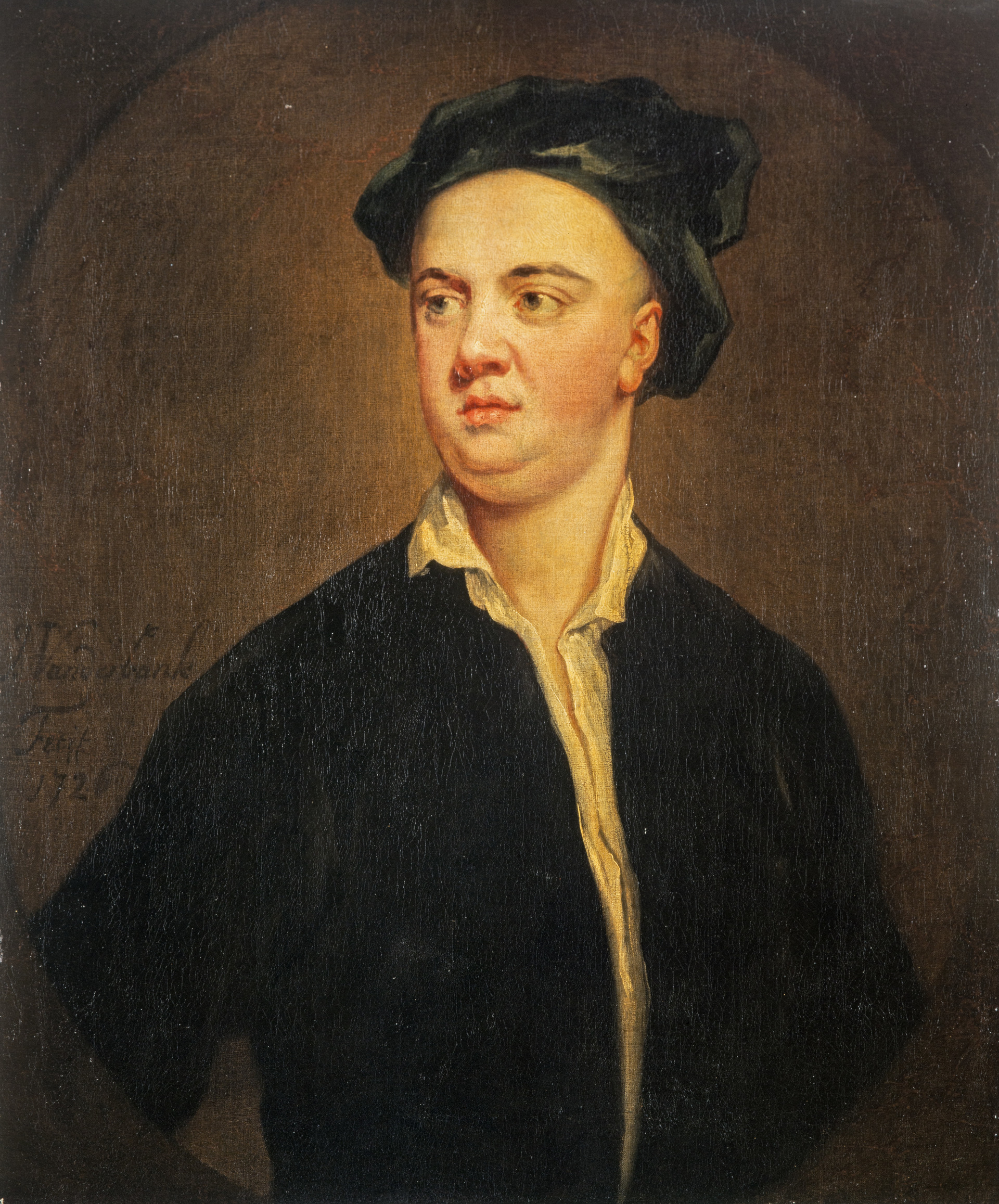
1726 portrait of Thomson by John Vanderbank

In London, Thomson became a tutor to the son of Charles Hamilton, Lord Binning, through connections on his mother's side of the family. Through David Mallet, by 1724 a published poet, Thomson met the great English poets of the day including Richard Savage, Aaron Hill and Alexander Pope. Thomson's mother died on 12 May 1725, around the time of his writing ‘Winter’, the first poem of The Seasons. "Winter" was first published in 1726 by John Millian, with a second edition being released (with revisions, additions and a preface) later the same year.

By 1727, Thomson was working on "Summer", published in February, and was working at Watt's Academy, a school for young gentlemen and a bastion of Newtonian science. In the same year Millian published a poem by Thomson titled "A Poem to the Memory of Sir Isaac Newton" (who had died in March). Leaving Watt's Academy, Thomson hoped to earn a living through his poetry, helped by his acquiring several wealthy patrons including Thomas Rundle, the countess of Hertford and Charles Talbot, 1st Baron Talbot.

== Later life, 1728–1748 ==
He wrote "Spring" in 1728 and finally "Autumn" in 1730, when the set of four was published together as The Seasons. During this period he also wrote other poems, such as "To the Memory of Sir Isaac Newton", and his first play, Sophonisba (1730). The latter is best known today for its mention in Samuel Johnson's Lives of the English Poets, where Johnson records that one 'feeble' line of the poem – "O, Sophonisba, Sophonisba, O!" was parodied by the wags of the theatre as, "O, Jemmy Thomson, Jemmy Thomson, O!"

In 1730, he became tutor to the son of Sir Charles Talbot, then Solicitor-General, and spent nearly two years in the company of the young man on a tour of Europe. On his return Talbot arranged for him to become a secretary in chancery, which gave him financial security until Talbot's death in 1737. Meanwhile, there appeared his next major work, Liberty (1734). This is a lengthy monologue by the "Goddess of Liberty", describing her travels through the ancient world, and then English and British history, before the resolution of the Glorious Revolution of 1688. In 1738 his tragedy Agamemnon was played at Drury Lane and the following year he wrote a prologue when Mallet's Mustapha was performed there.

In 1740, he collaborated with Mallet on the masque Alfred which was first performed at Cliveden, the country home of Frederick, Prince of Wales. Thomson's words for "Rule, Britannia!", written as part of that masque and set to music by Thomas Arne, became one of the best-known British patriotic songs – quite distinct from the masque which is now virtually forgotten. The Prince gave him a pension of £100 per annum. He had also introduced him to George Lyttelton, who became his friend and patron.

In later years, Thomson lived in Richmond upon Thames, and it was there that he wrote his final work The Castle of Indolence, which was published just before his untimely death on 27 August 1748. Johnson writes about Thomson's death, "by taking cold on the water between London and Kew, he caught a disorder, which, with some careless exasperation, ended in a fever that put end to his life". Thomson died indebted and intestate. To discharge his debts an auction of his goods was held.

A dispute over the publishing rights to one of his works, The Seasons, gave rise to two important legal decisions (Millar v. Taylor; Donaldson v. Beckett) in the history of copyright.

Thomson's The Seasons was translated into German by Barthold Heinrich Brockes (1745). This translation formed the basis for a work with the same title by Gottfried van Swieten, which became the libretto for Haydn's oratorio The Seasons. Some recordings of Haydn’s oratorio use Thomson’s original lyrics as well.

== Memorials ==
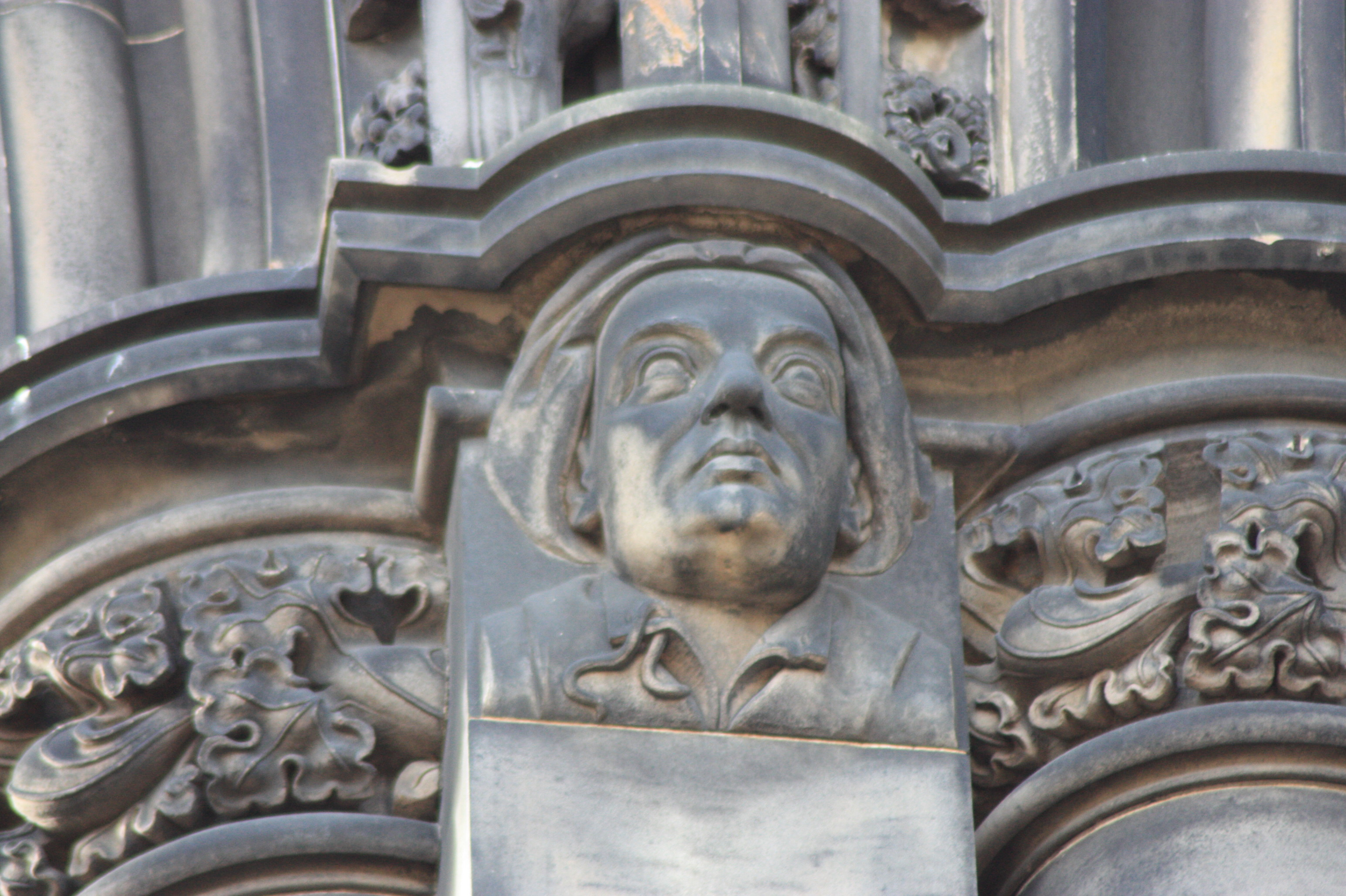
The poet James Thomson as depicted on the Scott Monument

Thomson is one of the sixteen Scottish poets and writers appearing on the Scott Monument on Princes Street in Edinburgh. He appears on the right side of the east face.

Thomson has a large memorial in Westminster Abbey's Poets' Corner, next to William Shakespeare and underneath Thomson's countryman, Robert Burns.

Thomson is the poet memorialised at Poets' Corner in Richmond Park's Pembroke Lodge Gardens. A bench sculpted by Richard Farrington, and known as "Poet's seat", is inscribed with lines by Thomson, who was living in Richmond at the time of his death. A wooden memorial plaque with an ode to Thomson by the writer and historian John Heneage Jesse was installed in 1851. The plaque was replaced by the Selborne Society in 1895 and by a re-gilded board in 2014.

King Henry's Mound, which is also in Richmond Park, has a seat inscribed with a few lines from The Seasons.

== Editions ==
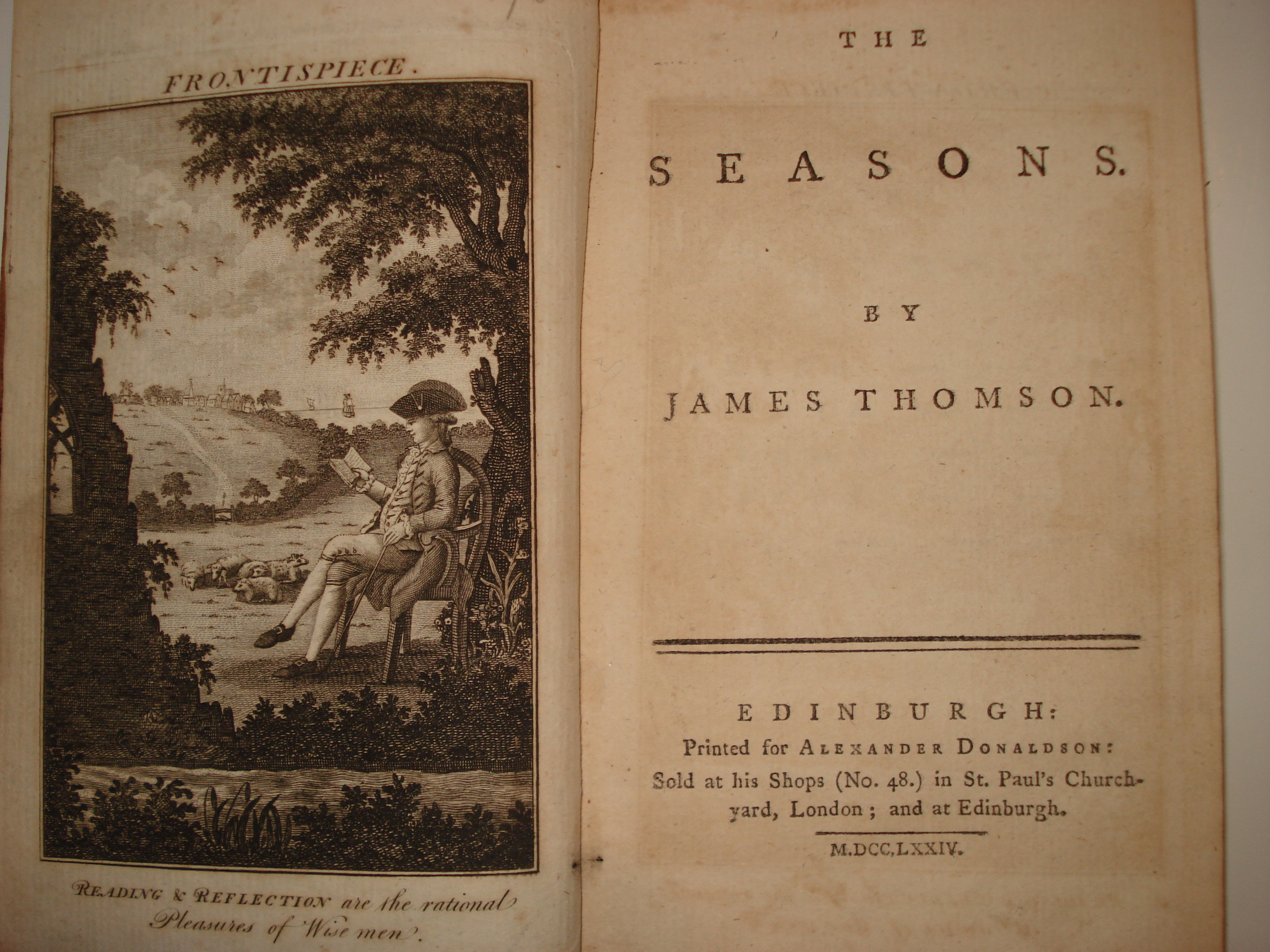
The frontispiece of The Seasons by James Thomson. Published by Alexander Donaldson

- The four seasons, and other poems. By James Thomson. London: printed for J. Millan, near Scotland-Yard, White-Hall; and A. Millar, in the Strand, M.DCC.XXXV., 1735. [2];77,[3];64;72;79,[1]p., plates; 8⁰. (ESTC T83; Foxon T242; OTA K019862.000)
- Patrick Murdoch (ed.), The Works of James Thomson, with his last corrections and improvements, prefixed by an account of his life and writings (Royal Quarto edition, A. Millar, London 1762); Dublin printing by John Exshaw, 1767; Murdoch's revised 4-volume edition of (A. Millar and T. Cadell, London 1768), with Lord Lyttelton's annotations, and 1772-3 edition (R. Clarke, Edinburgh 1772), (W. Bowyer, etc., London 1773) and subsequent versions.
- Thomson, James & Bloomfield, Robert, The Seasons & Castles of Indolence / The Farmer's Boy, Rural Tales, Banks of the Wye, &c. &c. (London: Scott, Webster & Geary, 1842).
- Gilfillan, Rev. George, Thomson's Poetical Works, with Life, Critical Dissertation, and Explanatory Notes, Library Edition of the British Poets (1854).
- Thomson, James. The Seasons (A. Donaldson, Edinburgh 1774; J. Donaldson, London 1776).
- Thomson, James. The Seasons, by ... A New Edition. Adorned with A Set of Engravings, from Original Paintings. Together with an Original Life of the Author, and a Critical Essay on the Seasons, by Robert Heron (Perth: R. Morison, 1793).
- Thomson, James The Seasons and Castle of Indolence Printed for J. and F. C. Rivington and the other proprietors, James Marsh, 1820
- Thomson, James. Poems, edited by William Bayne, London: Walter Scott Publishing Co., [1900] (Series: The Canterbury poets).
- Thomson, James. The Seasons, edited with introduction and commentary by James Sambrook (Oxford: Clarendon Press, 1981) ISBN 0-19-812713-8.
- Thomson, James. Liberty, The Castle of Indolence and other poems, edited with introduction and commentary by James Sambrook (Oxford: Clarendon Press, 1986) ISBN 0-19-812759-6.
- Bayne, William, Life of James Thomson, Edinburgh: Oliphant, Anderson and Ferrier, 1898 ("Famous Scots Series").

== Dramatic Works ==
Thomson was a verse dramatist, whose theatrical work was collected in The Works of James Thomson, Volume the Second.

- Sophonisba, A Tragedy (1730), written largely in blank verse. Based on the Carthaginian noblewoman of the same name. Sophonisba has also been represented in Giovanni Giorgio Trissino's Italian Sophonisba (1515-1524) which inspired The Wonder of Women by John Marston (1606), Sophonisba, or Hannibal's Overthrow by Nathaniel Lee (1675), and Thomson's play
- Agamemnon, A Tragedy (1738), written largely in blank verse, starring the reigning tragedian of the time, James Quin
- Alfred, A Masque (1740), written largely in blank verse with some rhyming song lyrics, co-written with David Mallet. Later reworked into an oratorio (1745) and then an opera (1753) with additional libretto by David Mallet and music by Thomas Arne. Best known for the patriotic song, "Rule, Britannia!"
- Edward and Eleonora, A Tragedy (1739), written largely in blank verse. Although it was originally scheduled to be performed at Covent Garden in 1739, it was banned by the censor under the Licensing Act. It finally premiered in 1775, after Thomson's death.
- Tancred and Sigismunda, A Tragedy (1745), written largely in blank verse, originally starring David Garrick as Tancred and Thomas Sheridan as Siffredi. Inspired by a story from Giovanni Boccaccio's The Decameron.
- Coriolanus, A Tragedy (1747-1749), written largely in blank verse. Thomson finished the play in 1747, but the play was not staged in Covent Garden until 1749, due to Garrick's refusal to play a supporting role this rival, James Quin

Thomson’s Coriolanus—following Livy rather than Plutarch, William Shakespeare’s source—is no more an adaptation of Shakespeare’s than Thomson’s Sophonisba is of Lee’s or his Agamemnon is of Aeschylus’s. Pared down to a simple action, in a more Racinian than Shakespearean manner [...]

== See also ==
- List of abolitionist forerunners

== Sources ==
- Tovey, Duncan Crookes (1911). "Thomson, James" . In Chisholm, Hugh (ed.). Encyclopædia Britannica. Vol. 26 (11th ed.). Cambridge University Press. pp. 871–873.
- "Thomson, James (1700–1748)" . Dictionary of National Biography. London: Smith, Elder & Co. 1885–1900.
- Sambrook, James. "Thomson, James (1700–1748)". Oxford Dictionary of National Biography (online ed.). Oxford University Press. doi:10.1093/ref:odnb/27306. (Subscription, Wikipedia Library access or UK public library membership required.)
