= Ambrose Philips =

17th/18th-century English poet and politician

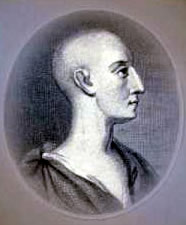
Ambrose Philips, an anonymous 18th-century engraving.

Ambrose Philips (1674 – 18 June 1749) was an English poet and politician. He feuded with other poets of his time, resulting in Henry Carey bestowing the nickname "Namby-Pamby" upon him, which came to mean affected, weak, and maudlin speech or verse.

== Life ==
Philips was born in Shropshire of a Leicestershire family. He was educated at Shrewsbury School and St John's College, Cambridge, of which he became a fellow in 1699. He seems to have lived chiefly at Cambridge until he resigned his fellowship in 1708, and his pastorals were probably written in this period. He worked for Jacob Tonson the bookseller, and his Pastorals opened the sixth volume of Tonson's Miscellanies (1709), which also contained the pastorals of Alexander Pope.

Philips was a staunch Whig, and a friend of Richard Steele and Joseph Addison. He was a member and secretary of the Whig Hanover Club. In Nos. 22, 23, 30 and 32 (1713) of The Guardian he was rashly praised as the only worthy successor to Edmund Spenser. The writer, probably Thomas Tickell, pointedly ignored Pope's pastorals. In The Spectator Addison applauded Philips for his simplicity, and for having written English eclogues unencumbered by the machinery of classical mythology. Pope's jealousy resulted in an anonymous contribution to the Guardian (No. 40), in which he drew an ironic comparison between his own and Philips's pastorals, censuring himself and praising Philips's worst passages. Philips is said to have threatened to hit Pope with a rod he kept hung up at Button's Coffee House for the purpose.

At Pope's request, John Gay burlesqued Philips's pastorals in his Shepherd's Week, but the parody was admired for the very quality of simplicity which it was intended to ridicule. Samuel Johnson describes the relations between Pope and Philips as a perpetual reciprocation of malevolence. Pope lost no opportunity of mocking Philips, who figured in the Bathos and the Dunciad, as Macer in the Characters; and in the instructions to a porter how to find Edmund Curll's authors, Philips is a Pindaric writer in red stockings. Others who ridiculed him included Henry Carey, who coined the nickname "Namby-Pamby" in the 1725 poem of that name:

To Charlotte Pulteney

TIMELY blossom, Infant fair,
Fondling of a happy pair,
Every morn and every night
Their solicitous delight,
Sleeping, waking, still at ease,
Pleasing, without skill to please;
Little gossip, blithe and hale,
Tattling many a broken tale,
Singing many a tuneless song,
Lavish of a heedless tongue;
Simple maiden, void of art,
Babbling out the very heart,
Yet abandoned to thy will,
Yet imagining no ill,
Yet too innocent to blush;
Like the linnet in the bush
To the mother-linnet's note
Moduling her slender throat;
Chirping forth thy petty joys,
Wanton in the change of toys,
Like the linnet green, in May
Flitting to each bloomy spray;
Wearied then and glad of rest,
Like the linnet in the nest; -
This thy present happy lot,
This in time will be forgot:
Other pleasures, other cares,
Ever busy Time prepares;
And thou shalt in thy daughter see,
This picture, once, resembled thee.

— By Ambrose Philips

All ye poets of the age,
All ye witlings of the stage …
Namby-Pamby is your guide,
Albion's joy, Hibernia's pride.
Namby-Pamby, pilly-piss,
Rhimy-pim'd on Missy Miss
Tartaretta Tartaree
From the navel to the knee;
That her father's gracy grace
Might give him a placy place.

Pope's poem The Dunciad (1728) follows: "Beneath his reign, shall ... Namby Pamby be prefer'd for Wit!" Gay and Swift also picked up the nickname, which became a general term for affected, weak, and maudlin speech or verse.

In 1718, Philips started a Whig paper, The Free-Thinker, in conjunction with Hugh Boulter, then vicar of St Olave's, Southwark. Philips had been made justice of the peace for Westminster, and in 1717 a commissioner for the lottery, and when Boulter was made Archbishop of Armagh, Philips accompanied him as secretary. Between 1727 and 1749, he sat in the Irish House of Commons for Armagh Borough, was secretary to the lord chancellor in 1726, and in 1733 became a judge of the prerogative court. His patron died in 1742, and six years later Philips returned to London, where he died on 18 June 1749.

== Works ==
His contemporary reputation rested on his pastorals and epistles, particularly the description of winter addressed by him from Copenhagen (1709) to the Earl of Dorset. In T. H. Ward's English Poets, however, he is represented by two of the simple and charming pieces addressed to the infant children of John Carteret, 2nd Lord Carteret, and of Daniel Pulteney. These were scoffed at by Jonathan Swift, and earned for Philips the nickname of "Namby-Pamby" as described above.

Philips's works include an abridgment of Bishop John Hacket's Life of John Williams (1700); The Thousand and One Days: Persian Tales (1722), from the French of F Pétis de la Croix; three plays: The Distrest Mother (1712), an adaptation of Racine's Andromaque; The Briton (1722); Humphrey, Duke of Gloucester (1723). Many of his poems, which included some translations from Sappho, Anacreon and Pindar, were published separately, and a collected edition appeared in 1748.

== Sources ==
- Stephen, Leslie (1896). "Philips, Ambrose" . In Lee, Sidney (ed.). Dictionary of National Biography. Vol. 45. London: Smith, Elder & Co.
- Varney, Andrew. "Philips, Ambrose (bap. 1674, d. 1749)". Oxford Dictionary of National Biography (online ed.). Oxford University Press. doi:10.1093/ref:odnb/22119. (Subscription, Wikipedia Library access or UK public library membership required.)

Parliament of Ireland
| Preceded by Silvester Crosse; John Eyre | Member of Parliament for Armagh Borough; 1727–1749; With: Edward Knatchbull | Succeeded by Edward Knatchbull; Philip Bragg |
