= Mary Porter (actress) =

English actress

Mary Porter (died 24 February 1765) was an English actress.

== Life ==
She was brought to the attention of Betterton by Elizabeth Barry, who had seen her play the Fairy Queen at Bartholomew Fair.

In his company she made her first appearance in 1699, in tragedy, in which she was at her best, although she also played a long list of comedy parts. When her friends, Mrs Barry, Mrs Bracegirdle and Mrs Oldfield, had retired from the stage, she was left its undisputed queen.

In 1713, she appeared in John Gay's comedy The Wife of Bath at Drury Lane. In 1724 she featured in his tragedy The Captives as Astarbe, Queen of Media.

== Selected roles ==
- Mirabel in The Rival Fools by Colley Cibber (1709)
- Alicia in Jane Shore by Nicholas Rowe (1714)
- Lady Woodvill in The Non-Juror by Colley Cibber (1717)
- Eudocia in The Siege of Damascus by John Hughes (1720)
- Astarbe in The Captives by John Gay (1724)
