= John Hughes (poet) =

English poet, essayist, and translator

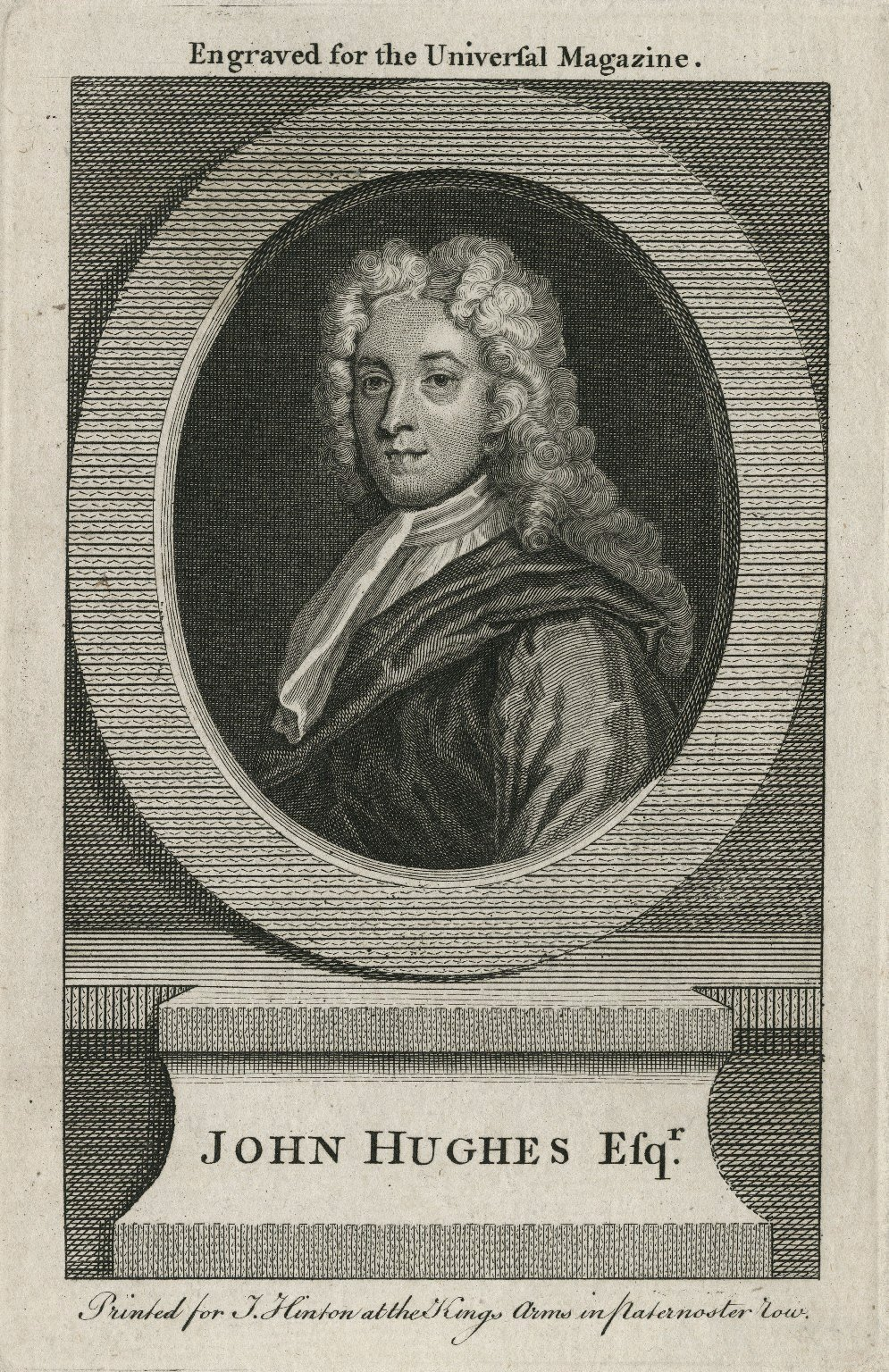
An engraving after Godfrey Kneller's portrait of the poet

John Hughes (29 January 1677 – 17 February 1720) was an English poet, essayist and translator. Various of his works remained in print for a century after his death, but if he is remembered at all today it is for the use others made of his work. Texts of his were set by the foremost composers of the day and his translation of the Letters of Abelard and Heloise was a major source for Alexander Pope's Eloisa to Abelard.

== Life and work ==
Hughes was born in Marlborough, Wiltshire, the elder son of John Hughes, clerk in the Hand-in-Hand Fire Office, Snow Hill, London, and his wife Anne Burges, daughter of Isaac Burges of Wiltshire. He was educated in London, receiving the rudiments of learning in private schools. Emerging from education with an interest in all the arts, Hughes had to earn his living as a secretary at the Board of Ordnance. His poetry often dealt with patriotic themes and was judiciously dedicated to political lords but did not obtain for him a sinecure until late in his life. In fact his literary ability was mediocre, but he retained the friendship of such leading Augustan writers as Joseph Addison, Richard Steele and Alexander Pope. He was in the company of all these as a contributor to The Spectator, and also wrote essays for several other periodicals of the day. In one on "The Inventory of a Beau" he describes a picture of himself as a young man about town wearing "a well trimmed blue suit, with scarlet stockings rolled above the knee, a large white peruke, and a flute half an ell long". His portrait by Godfrey Kneller some two decades later is more restrained, except for the length of the wig.

As an amateur musician, Hughes mixed with composers and took part in the musical politics of the time, championing those who opposed over-dependence on the Italian language for singing. To prove his point he wrote many cantatas taking the form of recitative passages interspersed by sung airs. His first set of six "after the manner of the Italians" was prefaced by a defence of the use of English for such compositions, pleading that comprehension of the words adds to the pleasure, and that recitative provides variety. The cantatas were set by Johann Christoph Pepusch, for whom Hughes wrote many more, as well as an ode for the birthday of the Princess of Wales and the masque "Apollo and Daphne". He also wrote cantatas for Johann Ernst Galliard, as well as the opera Calypso and Telemachus. This had an introduction that repeated much the same points as the earlier preface to the cantatas, with the addition of a vigorous commendation by Topham Foot asserting that, with the advent of "our own British Muse",

Th'Italian opera sure will quit the Stage
And Charms Superior fix the flutt'ring Age.
Musick and Verse no longer disagree,
Nor Sense is now a Foe to Harmony.

Single cantatas by Hughes were also set by Henry Purcell, Nicola Francesco Haym and George Frideric Handel, and an "Ode in Praise of Music" was performed in 1703 in a setting by Philip Hart. The ode was another favourite form used by Hughes, written in the pindarics popularised by Abraham Cowley, although in this particular he was at odds with his Augustan friends.

Besides dramatic compositions for music, Hughes had been trying his hand at plays since his schooldays, and had also translated scenes or whole plays from other languages, but he never had success in this form until the very end of his life, when his tragedy, The Siege of Damascus, was put on at the Theatre Royal, Drury Lane in February 1720. News of its successful first performance only reached the author on the night that he died, of tuberculosis, in London. Many more performances and revivals followed through the course of the century.

Among his scholarly work can be included his contributions to White Kennett's Complete History of England (1706) and his own six-volume edition of The Works of Mr. Edmund Spenser (1715). He also translated Bernard Le Bovier de Fontenelle's Dialogues of the Dead (1708), a work that a century later was to serve as the model for Landor's Imaginary Conversations. But his most successful work was the Letters of Abelard and Heloise (1713), translated from a French version, of which there were numerous new editions for over a century. Its popularity can partly be explained by its having served as the basis for Pope's "Eloisa to Abelard", and that poem was eventually added to Hughes work in later editions.

As Richard Steele noted in his article on the death of Hughes, he was in ill-health through much of his life. After his death from consumption, he was buried under the chancel of St. Andrew, Holborn. His brother-in-law collected his poetry and some essays in 1735 and Samuel Johnson devoted a short article to him in the Lives of the Most Eminent English Poets.

== Bibliography ==
- Barker, G.F.R. (1900). "Hughes, John (1677-1720)" . In Lee, Sidney (ed.). Dictionary of National Biography. Vol. 28. London: Smith, Elder & Co. pp. 178–180.
- Hughes, John, Poems on Several Occasions (1735), vol.1 and vol.2
- Johnson, Samuel, Lives of the Most Eminent English Poets (1799–81), "John Hughes"
