= 1719 in literature =

This article contains information about the literary events and publications of 1719.

== Events ==
- March 14 – Richard Steele launches The Plebeian, in opposition to government policy on peerages.
- April 23–25 – Daniel Defoe's novel Robinson Crusoe is published in London (by W. Taylor) as his first work of fiction, written aged about 60. The initial title is The Life and Strange Surprizing Adventures of Robinson Crusoe, of York, Mariner: Who lived Eight and Twenty Years, all alone in an un-inhabited Island on the Coast of America, near the Mouth of the Great River of Oroonoque; Having been cast on Shore by Shipwreck, wherein all the Men perished but himself. With An Account how he was at last as strangely deliver'd by Pyrates. Written by Himself. Defoe's anonymity is broken in September by Charles Gildon in The Life and Strange Surprizing Adventures of Mr D— De D—, of London, Hosier. By the end of the year the book has run through four editions. Defoe's sequel, The Farther Adventures of Robinson Crusoe, competes with several imitators.
- October 30 – Defoe launches a periodical, The Manufacturer.
- unknown date – The widow of the dramatist Nicholas Rowe receives a pension from King George I of Great Britain for her husband's translation of Lucan's Pharsalia, published complete, posthumously, in this year.

== New books ==
=== Prose ===
- Anonymous – Zulima
- Joseph Addison
  - Maxims, Observations, and Reflections
  - Notes upon the Twelve Books of Paradise Lost
  - The Old Whig I
  - The Old Whig II
- John Durant Breval – Ovid in Masquerade ("by Mr. Joseph Gay" – part of Curll's continuing battle with John Gay)
- Daniel Defoe
  - Robinson Crusoe
  - The Farther Adventures of Robinson Crusoe
  - The King of Pirates
- Jean-Baptiste Dubos – Réflexions critiques sur la poésie et sur la peinture
- Charles Gildon – The Life and Strange Surprising Adventures of Mr. D—DeF--, of London, Hosier (satire on Defoe)
- Eliza Haywood (anonymous) – Love in Excess; Or, The Fatal Enquiry vol. 1
- Benjamin Hoadly – The Common Rights of Subjects, Defended
- Giles Jacob – The Poetical Register (biographies of playwrights, by themselves)
- Peter Kolbe – Caput Bonae Spei Hodiernum
- Nicholas Rowe – Lucan's Pharsalia
- Isaac Watts – The Psalms of David (transl.)
- Georg von Welling – Opus magotheosophicum et cabbalisticum
- Edward Young – A Letter to Mr. Tickell (on Addison's death)

=== Drama ===
- Anonymous – Heroick Friendship (attributed to Thomas Otway)
- Anonymous – The Younger Brother
- Charles Beckingham – Henry IV of France
- Thomas Betterton – The Bond-Man
- Colley Cibber – Ximena (published)
- John Dennis – The Invader of His Country
- Charles Johnson – The Masquerade
- Thomas Killigrew – Chit Chat
- John Leigh – Kensington Gardens
- Charles Shadwell – Rotherick O'Connor, King of Connaught
- George Sewell – Sir Walter Raleigh
- Thomas Southerne – The Spartan Dame
- William Taverner – 'Tis Well if it Takes
- Francis Tolson – The Earl of Warwick: Or, British Exile. A Tragedy.
- Edward Young – Busiris, King of Egypt

=== Poetry ===
- Matthew Prior – Poems on Several Occasions
- Allan Ramsay – Content
- See also 1719 in poetry

== Births ==
- January 17 – Johann Elias Schlegel, German critic and dramatic poet (died 1749)
- March 29 – John Hawkins, English writer and biographer (died 1789)
- May 30 – Roger Newdigate, English politician, founder of the Newdigate Prize for poetry (died 1806)
- July 4 – Michel-Jean Sedaine, French dramatist (died 1797)
- July 23 – Frances Boscawen, English diarist and bluestocking (died 1805)
- October 17 – Jacques Cazotte, French fantasy writer (died 1792)
- November 23 – Spranger Barry, Irish-born actor (died 1777)

== Deaths ==
- January 18 – Samuel Garth, English poet and physician (born 1661)
- April 15 – Françoise d'Aubigné, Marquise de Maintenon, consort and belle of the French court (born 1635)
- June 17 – Joseph Addison, English journalist and satirist (born 1672)
- July 17 – Elinor James, English pamphleteer (born 1644)
- September 7 – John Harris, English writer (born c. 1666)
- November 19 – Charles-Claude Genest, French poet and dramatist (born 1639)
- November 26 – John Hudson, English classicist and librarian (born 1662)
- December 2 – Pasquier Quesnel, French theologian (born 1634)
- December 31 – John Flamsteed, English Astronomer Royal (born 1646)
