= Christiana Horton =

English actress

- Born: c. 1696
- Died: c. 1756
- Occupation: Actor
- Years active: 1714 – 1749

Christiana Horton (c. 1696 – c. 1756) was an English actress.

Discovered at Southwark Fair, she first appeared in London as Melinda in The Recruiting Officer in 1714 at the Theatre Royal, Drury Lane. Here she remained twenty years, followed by fifteen at the Theatre Royal, Covent Garden.

At both houses during this long career she played all the leading tragedy and comedy parts, and Barton Booth (who discovered her) said she was the best successor of Anne Oldfield. She was the original Mariana in Fielding's The Miser (1733). She was cast as Belinda in The Old Bachelor and as Mrs Millamant in The Way of the World.

== Selected roles ==
- Melinda in The Recruiting Officer by George Farquhar (1714)
- Emmelin in Lucius by Delarivier Manley (1717)
- Caelia in The Masquerade by Charles Johnson (1719)
- Isabella in The Revenge by Edward Young (1721)
- Olivia in The Artifice by Susanna Centlivre (1722)
- Clary in The Rival Modes by James Moore Smythe (1727)
- Ethra in Medea by Charles Johnson (1730)
- Mariana in The Miser by Henry Fielding (1733)
- Eucharis in Timon in Love by John Kelly (1733)
- Harriet in The Double Deceit by William Popple (1735)
- Lady Bellair in The Rival Widows by Elizabeth Cooper (1735)
- Lady Fragile in The Trial of Conjugal Love by Hildebrand Jacob (1738)
