= 1998 Laurence Olivier Awards =

Edition of London theatre awards

The 1998 Laurence Olivier Awards were held in 1998 in London celebrating excellence in West End theatre by the Society of London Theatre.

== Winners and nominees ==
Details of winners (in bold) and nominees, in each award category, per the Society of London Theatre.

Play of the Year	Best New Musical
**Closer by Patrick Marber – National Theatre Cottesloe / Lyttelton**; Amy's View by David Hare – National Theatre Lyttelton / Aldwych; Hurlyburly by David Rabe – Queen's; The Invention of Love by Tom Stoppard – National Theatre Cottesloe / Lyttelton; Tom and Clem by Stephen Churchett – Aldwych	**Beauty and the Beast – Dominion**; Enter the Guardsman – Donmar Warehouse; Lady in the Dark – National Theatre Lyttelton; The Fix – Donmar Warehouse
Best Comedy	Best Entertainment
**Popcorn by Ben Elton – Apollo**; A Skull in Connemara by Martin McDonagh – Royal Court; East Is East by Ayub Khan-Din – Royal Court	**Slava's Snowshow – Old Vic**; Maureen Lipman: Live and Kidding – Duchess; Marlene – Lyric; She Knows You Know – Vaudeville
Outstanding Musical Production
**Chicago – Adelphi**; Damn Yankees – Adelphi; Kiss Me, Kate – Regent's Park Open Air
Best Actor	Best Actress
**Ian Holm as Lear in King Lear – National Theatre Cottesloe**; Simon Russell Beale as Iago in Othello – National Theatre Cottesloe; Michael Gambon as Tom Driberg in Tom and Clem – Aldwych; Rupert Graves as Eddie in Hurlyburly – Queen's; John Wood as A. E. Housman in The Invention of Love – National Theatre Cottesloe / Lyttelton	**Zoë Wanamaker as Electra in Electra – Donmar Warehouse**; Judi Dench as Esme Allen in Amy's View – National Theatre Lyttelton / Aldwych; Sally Dexter as Anna in Closer – National Theatre Cottesloe / Lyttelton; Maggie Smith as Claire in A Delicate Balance – Haymarket
Best Actor in a Musical	Best Actress in a Musical
**Philip Quast as Grahame Chandler in The Fix – Donmar Warehouse**; John Barrowman as Cal Chandler in The Fix – Donmar Warehouse; Henry Goodman as Billy Flynn in Chicago – Adelphi; Andrew C. Wadsworth as Fred Graham/Petruchio in Kiss Me, Kate – Regent's Park Open Air	**Ute Lemper as Velma Kelly in Chicago – Adelphi**; Maria Friedman as Liza Elliott in Lady in the Dark – National Theatre Lyttelton; Ruthie Henshall as Roxie Hart in Chicago – Adelphi; Siân Phillips as Marlene Dietrich in Marlene – Lyric
Best Performance in a Supporting Role	Best Supporting Performance in a Musical
**Sarah Woodward as Kitty in Tom and Clem – Aldwych**; Michael Bryant as The Fool in King Lear – National Theatre Cottesloe; Ronald Pickup as Frank Oddie in Amy's View – National Theatre Lyttelton / Aldwych; Paul Rhys as Edgar in King Lear – National Theatre Cottesloe	**James Dreyfus as Russell Paxton in Lady in the Dark – National Theatre Lyttelton**; Nicky Henson as Playwright/Narrator in Enter the Guardsman – Donmar Warehouse; April Nixon as Lola in Damn Yankees – Adelphi; Issy Van Randwyck as Lois Lane/Bianca Minola in Kiss Me, Kate – Regent's Park Open Air
Best Director	Best Theatre Choreographer
**Richard Eyre for King Lear – National Theatre Cottesloe**; Walter Bobbie for Chicago – Adelphi; Sam Mendes for Othello – National Theatre Cottesloe; Matthew Warchus for Hamlet – RSC at the Barbican	**Simon McBurney for The Caucasian Chalk Circle – National Theatre Olivier**; Rob Marshall for Damn Yankees – Adelphi; Ann Reinking for Chicago – Adelphi; Matt West for Beauty and the Beast – Dominion
Best Set Designer	Best Costume Designer
**Tim Goodchild for Three Hours after Marriage – RSC at the Barbican Pit**; William Dudley for The Homecoming – National Theatre Lyttelton; John Gunter for The Peter Hall Company's season – Old Vic; Rob Howell for Chips with Everything – National Theatre Lyttelton	**Tim Goodchild for Three Hours after Marriage – RSC at the Barbican Pit**; Nicky Gillibrand for Lady in the Dark – National Theatre Lyttelton; Ann Hould-Ward for Beauty and the Beast – Dominion; William Ivey Long for Chicago – Adelphi
Best Lighting Designer
**Rick Fisher for Chips with Everything and Lady in the Dark – National Theatre Lyttelton**; Paul Anderson for The Chairs – Royal Court; Howard Harrison for The Fix – Donmar Warehouse; Hugh Vanstone for Hamlet – RSC at the Barbican
Outstanding Achievement in Dance	Best New Dance Production
**Lez Brotherston for costuming and set designing for Cinderella, Adventures in Motion Pictures – Piccadilly**; Altynai Asylmuratova in Swan Lake, English National Ballet – Royal Albert Hall; Mark Morris for choreographing L'Allegro, il Penseroso ed il Moderato, Mark Morris Dance Group – London Coliseum	**L'Allegro, il Penseroso ed il Moderato, Dance Umbrella and Mark Morris Dance Group – London Coliseum**; Swan Lake, English National Ballet – Royal Albert Hall; The Nutcracker Sweeties, Birmingham Royal Ballet – Royal Opera House
Outstanding Achievement in Opera	Outstanding New Opera Production
**Paul Daniel for conducting From the House of the Dead, English National Opera – London Coliseum**; Alan Opie in Falstaff, English National Opera and Opera North – London Coliseum; Mark Henderson, Nikolaus Leloff, Tobias Moheisel and Bettina J. Walker for helming Palestrina – Royal Opera House; Francesco Zambello for directing Paul Bunyan, The Royal Opera – Shaftesbury	**Paul Bunyan, The Royal Opera – Shaftesbury**; Falstaff, English National Opera and Opera North – London Coliseum; Palestrina, The Royal Opera – Royal Opera House; Platée, The Royal Opera – Barbican
Society Special Award
**David Mirvish and Ed Mirvish**

== Productions with multiple nominations and awards ==
The following 23 productions, including two ballets and two operas, received multiple nominations:

- 7: Chicago
- 5: Lady in the Dark
- 4: King Lear and The Fix
- 3: Amy's View, Beauty and the Beast, Damn Yankees, Kiss Me, Kate and Tom and Clem
- 2: Chips with Everything, Closer, Enter the Guardsman, Falstaff, Hamlet, Hurlyburly, L'Allegro, il Penseroso ed il Moderato, Marlene, Othello, Palestrina, Paul Bunyan, Swan Lake, Three Hours after Marriage and The Invention of Love

The following four productions received multiple awards:

- 2: Chicago, King Lear, Lady in the Dark and Three Hours after Marriage

== See also ==
- 52nd Tony Awards
