= The Village Opera =

1729 ballad opera by Charles Johnson

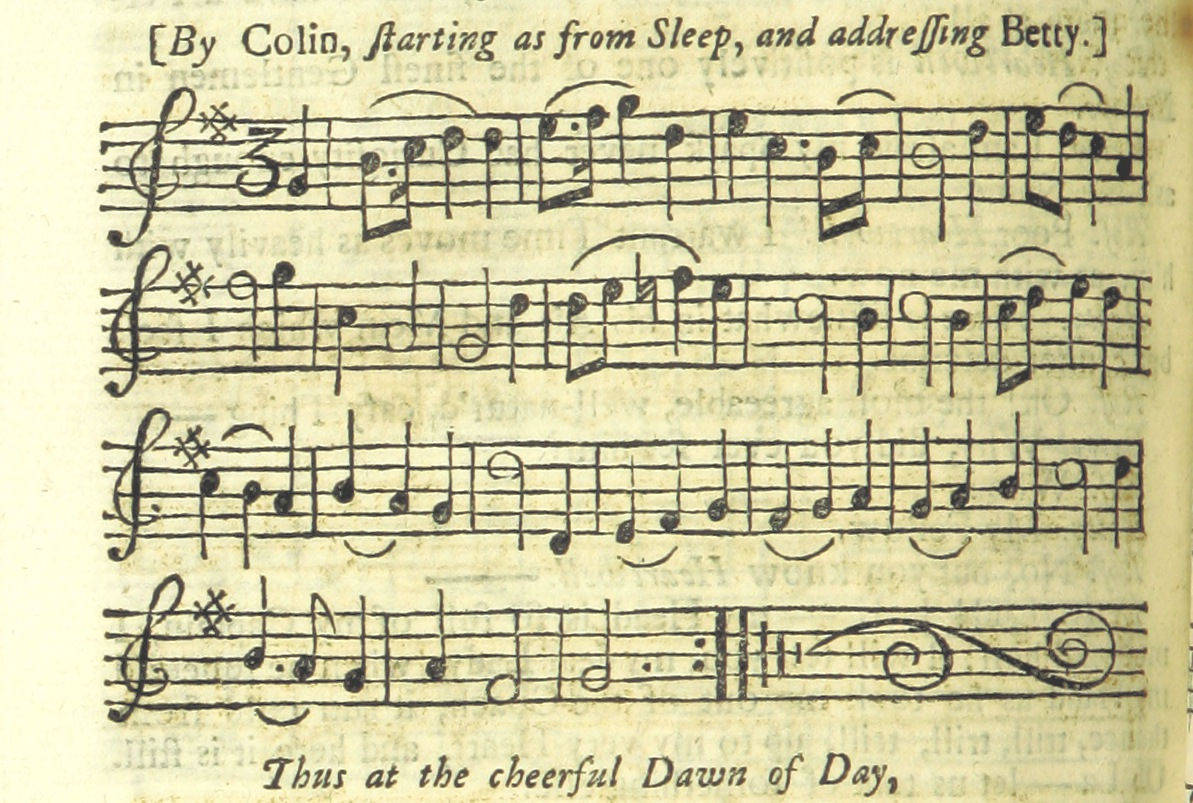
- Original language: English
- Written by: Charles Johnson
- Genre: Comedy

Premiere
- Date: 6 February 1729
- Place: Theatre Royal, Drury Lane

The Village Opera is a 1729 ballad opera by the British writer Charles Johnson. It was part of a group of ballad operas produced in the wake of the great success of John Gay's The Beggar's Opera.

The original Drury Lane cast included John Harper as Sir Nicholas Wiseacre, Benjamin Griffin as Sir William Freeman, Charles Williams as Freeman, Benjamin Johnson as Lucas, Joe Miller as Brush, James Oates as File, Edward Berry as Hobinol, Kitty Clive as Rosella, Sarah Thurmond as Betty and Frances Cross as Lady Wiseacre.

Thomas Arne later wrote Love in a Village from a libretto based on Johnson's original. In the twentieth century Michael Tippett composed his own version of Johnson's work.

== Bibliography ==
- Burling, William J. A Checklist of New Plays and Entertainments on the London Stage, 1700-1737. Fairleigh Dickinson Univ Press, 1992.
- Nicoll, Allardyce. A History of Early Eighteenth Century Drama: 1700-1750. CUP Archive, 1927.
