= The Masquerade (play) =

1719 play

- Original language: English
- Written by: Charles Johnson
- Genre: Comedy

Premiere
- Date: 16 January 1719
- Place: Theatre Royal, Drury Lane

The Masquerade is a 1719 comedy play by the British writer Charles Johnson.

The original Drury Lane cast included Robert Wilks as Sir George Jealous, Thomas Elrington as Ombre, Joe Miller as Smart, Colley Cibber as Masquerader, Henry Norris as Whisper, Anne Oldfield as Sophronia, Sarah Thurmond as Lady Frances Ombre and Christiana Horton as Caelia.

== Bibliography ==
- Burling, William J. A Checklist of New Plays and Entertainments on the London Stage, 1700-1737. Fairleigh Dickinson Univ Press, 1992.
- Nicoll, Allardyce. History of English Drama, 1660-1900, Volume 2. Cambridge University Press, 2009.
