= Love in a Village =

Opera by Thomas Arne

- Ballad opera (pastiche) by Thomas Arne
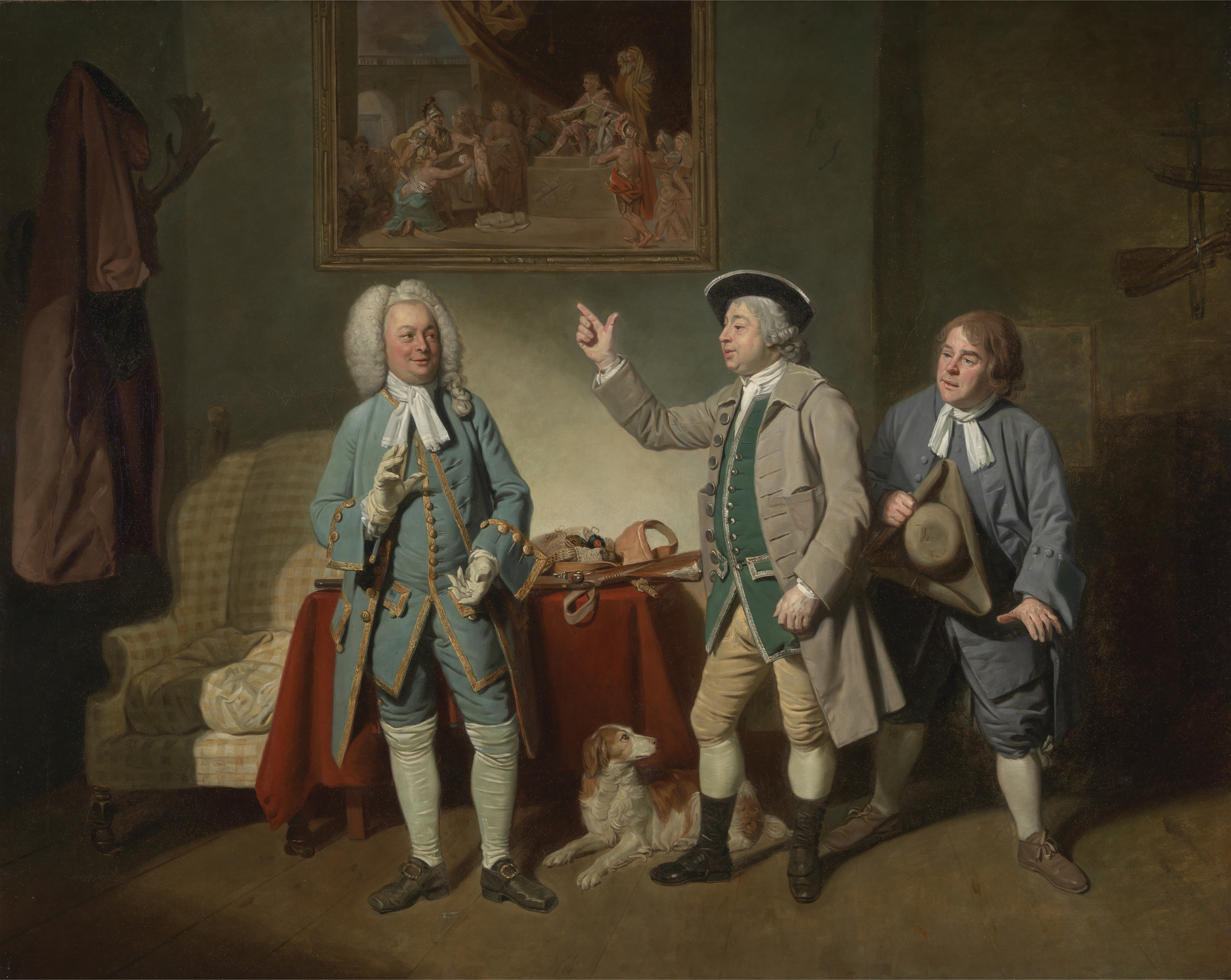
- 1767 oil painting by Johann Zoffany showing Edward Shuter as Justice Woodcock, John Beard as Hawthorn, and John Dunstall as Hodge in Act 1, Scene 2
- Librettist: Isaac Bickerstaffe
- Based on: Johnson's The Village Opera
- Premiere: 8 December 1762; Covent Garden theatre, London

Love in a Village is a ballad opera in three acts that was composed and arranged by Thomas Arne. A pastiche, the work contains 42 musical numbers of which only five were newly composed works by Arne. The other music is made up of 13 pieces borrowed from Arne's earlier stage works, a new overture was by C. F. Abel, and 23 songs by other composers, including Bishop, Boyce, Geminiani, Giordani, and Galuppi, albeit with new texts. The English libretto, by Isaac Bickerstaffe, is based on Charles Johnson’s 1729 play The Village Opera. The opera premiered at the Royal Opera, Covent Garden in London on 8 December 1762. One of its best known songs is the Miller of Dee.

== History ==
Love in a Village was received enthusiastically at its premiere and became one of Arne's more popular operas, enjoying 40 performances in its first season alone. The work's success began a vogue for pastiche opera in England that lasted well into the 19th century. The opera has subsequently been revived numerous times, both during Arne's lifetime and after. A notable revival occurred at the Lyric Hammersmith in London in 1928, using an adaptation by Alfred Reynolds. The opera was first published in 1763, but without recitative or librettos. A copy of the full score, which is partly in the composer’s hand, also survives and is in the collection of the library at the Royal College of Music. Most of the music displays a simple and lyrical nature with the exception of the music for Rosetta. Rosetta, a role written for Arne's lover Charlotte Brent, requires a gifted coloratura soprano, particularly for the aria "The traveller benighted" which has several challenging passages containing wide vocal leaps, fast runs, and trills.

== Roles ==
Role	Voice type	Premiere Cast, 8 December 1762 (Conductor: - Thomas Arne)
Rosetta	soprano	Charlotte Brent
Thomas Meadows	tenor	George Mattocks
Lucinde	soprano	Isabella Mattocks
Farmer Hawthorne	tenor	John Beard
Eustace	tenor	Michael Dyer
Margery	soprano	Elizabeth Davies
Hodge	tenor	John Dunstall
Justice Woodcock	spoken role	Edward Shuter
Sir William Meadows	spoken role	

== Synopsis ==
The heroine of the story, Rosetta, is fearful of her impending marriage to a man she has never met. Worried that she will be miserable, she runs away from home and acquires a position as a chambermaid in the home of Justice Woodcock. Meanwhile, the son of Sir William Meadows, Thomas, is in an equivalent situation. He also avoids his impending marriage by posing as a gardener in the Justice's household. Rosetta and Thomas meet and soon fall in love. However, both of their families are determined to make them marry their intended future spouses. Just as all seems hopeless, Sir William arrives and reveals that the young lovers have in fact been betrothed to each other the whole time.

== Arias ==
Act 1

- Overture
- Hope, thou nurse of young desire [duet]
- Whence can you inherit
- My heart’s my own
- When once love’s subtle
- O had I been by fate decreed
- Gentle youth, ah! Tell me why
- Still in hopes to get the better
- There was a jolly miller
- Let gay ones and great
- The honest heart whose thoughts are clear
- Well, well, say no more
- Cupid God of soft persuasion
- How happy were my days till now
- I pray ye gentles list to me [“a medley”]

Act 2

- We women like poor Indians trade
- Think my fairest how delay
- Believe me dear aunt
- When I follow’d a lass
- Let rakes and libertines resigned [duet]
- How blest the maid whose bosom
- In vain I ev’ry art essay
- Begone, I agree [duet]
- Oh how shall I in language weak
- Young I am and sore afraid
- Oons! Neighbour ne’er blush
- My Dolly was the fairest thing
- Was ever poor fellow so plagued
- Cease gay seducers
- Since Hodge proves ungrateful
- In love should there meet a fond pair
- Well, come let us hear [trio]

Act 3

- The world is a well furnished table
- ‘Tis not wealth, it is not birth
- The traveller benighted
- If ever a fond inclination
- A plague of those wenches
- How much superior beauty awes
- When we see a lover languish
- All I with her obtaining [duet]
- If ever I’m catched
- Go naughty man
- Hence with cares, complaints and frowning

== Sources ==
NB: the 1911 Encyclopædia Britannica, Volume 3 entry for "Battishill, Jonathan" and footnote no.31 at https://nnp.wustl.edu/library/book/512338?page=22 correct the mistaken first name given by Casaglia above. See also the wikipage for Battishill.
