= Medea (Johnson play) =

1730 play

- Original language: English
- Written by: Charles Johnson
- Genre: Tragedy

Premiere
- Date: 11 December 1730
- Place: Theatre Royal, Drury Lane

Medea is a 1730 play by the British writer Charles Johnson. It is about Medea from Greek mythology and based on the play Medea by Euripides.

The original Drury Lane cast included Mary Porter as Medea, Robert Wilks as Jason, William Mills as Aegeus, Christiana Horton as Ethra, John Mills as Creon, Sarah Thurmond as Creusa, Thomas Hallam as Eumelus and John Corey as Therapion.

== Bibliography ==
- Burling, William J. A Checklist of New Plays and Entertainments on the London Stage, 1700-1737. Fairleigh Dickinson Univ Press, 1992.
- Saxton, Kirsten T. (2017). Narratives of Women and Murder in England, 1680–1760: Deadly Plots. London: Routledge. ISBN 978-1-317-09021-2.
