= Bajazet (play) =

Play by Jean Racine

Bajazet, 1672 (book in DjVu format)

Bajazet (French: [baʒazɛ]) is a five-act tragedy by Jean Racine written in alexandrine verse and first performed at the Hôtel de Bourgogne theatre in January 1672, after Berenice, and before Mithridate. Like Aeschylus in The Persians, Racine took his subject from contemporary history, taking care to choose a far off location, the Ottoman Empire. In 1635, the sultan Murad IV (Amurat, in the work of Racine) had his brothers and potential rivals Bajazet (Bayezid) and Orcan (Orhan) executed. Racine was inspired by this deed, and centered his play on Bajazet. Racine also develops several romantic subplots in the seraglio. The action is particularly complex, and can only be resolved by a series of deaths and suicides.

The initial success of the play was not prolonged. Today, it is one Racine's least played pieces. In 1717 it was staged in London's Drury Lane Theatre under the title The Sultaness after being rewritten by Charles Johnson. The character of Bajazet in the opera of the same name by Antonio Vivaldi is not the same as the protagonist of Racine. The play was translated into English by Alan Hollinghurst. This translation was published by Chatto & Windus in 1991. In 2011 Pennsylvania State University Press published an English translation of the play by Geoffrey Alan Argent in iambic pentameter couplets. A translation in Alexandrines was made, as for all the other Racine plays, by Samuel Solomon and published by Random House (1967).

== Summary of the play ==
=== Act 1 (4 scenes) ===
Osmin brings news of the sultan Amurat to Byzantium : they appear to be at the point of abandoning the siege of Babylon. Acomat, grand vizir, wishes to take advantage of this failure by encouraging the Janissaries to revolt. He has already refused to execute Bajazet as the sultan commanded. Finally, Acomat believes Bajazet and Roxane, the sultan's favorite, are in love, and he wishes to rely on them while marrying Atalide. In reality, Bajazet is in love with Atalide; he only returns the love of Roxane in order to become king.

=== Act 2 (5 scenes) ===
Roxane wants to dethrone Amurat by wedding Bajazet. He is reluctant, which infuriates Roxane. Acomat and then Atalide push Bajazet to accept, and he considers it.

=== Act 3 (8 scenes) ===
Bajazet and Roxane make up, while Atalide wishes to die, having saved the man she loves. Bajazet comes to tell her that he has only made vague promises to Roxane. Roxane overhears this conversation, and begins to realize Bajazet and Atalide's relationship.

=== Act 4 (7 scenes) ===
Orcan, the sultan's servant, has come home to announce that, against all odds, Amurat has taken Babylon. Roxane receives evidence of the love between Bajazet and Atalide, and it is these two elements which force Roxane into action: she will kill Bajazet in order to please the sultan. Acomat, who up until now has conspired with Bajazet and Roxane, has decided to act from now on without them.

=== Act 5 (12 scenes) ===
After one final interview with Bajazet, Roxane has him hanged. After this, she is assassinated by Orcan, who is acting under a secret order of the Sultan. The conspiracy of Acomat is run aground, and Atalide kills herself on stage.

== Sources ==
- This article was translated from the French Wikipedia page Bajazet.
