= Thomas Elrington (actor) =

English actor

- Born: 1688; London
- Died: 1732 (aged 43–44)

Thomas Elrington (1688–1732), was an English actor.

== Biography ==
Elrington was born in 1688 in London, near Golden Square, was apprenticed by his father, who 'had the honour to serve the late Duke of Montagu', to a French upholsterer in Covent Garden. His associate, William Chetwood, tells many stories of the difficulties that beset them in their joint attempts at amateur performances. Through the introduction of Theophilus Keene, an actor of reputation, Elrington seems to have made his way on to the stage. His first appearance took place 2 December 1709 at Drury Lane, as Oroonoko. He subsequently acted Captain Plume in the Recruiting Officer the ghost in Œdipus, Cribbage in the Fair Quaker, etc. In the summer he played with William Penkethman at Greenwich, taking characters of importance. During 1710–12 he remained at Drury Lane.

In 1712 Elrington was engaged by Joseph Ashbury, the manager of the Smock Alley Theatre, Dublin, at which house he appeared, taking from the first leading parts in tragedy and comedy — The History of Timon of Athens the Man-hater in Thomas Shadwell's alteration of Shakespeare, Colonel Blunt in Sir Robert Howard's The Committee, or the Faithful Irishman, Lord Townly in The Provoked Husband etc.

In 1713 Elrington married Francis (born 1679), daughter of Ashbury, after whose death he succeeded to the management of the theatre. He obtained also Ashbury's appointments of deputy-master of the revels and steward of the king's inns of court. A post in the Quit-rent Office was also given him, and by Lord Mountjoy he was made "gunner to the train of artillery", a post of some emolument, which subsequently he was allowed to sell. Under his management Smock Alley Theatre prospered, and he enjoyed high social and artistic consideration.

Elrington made occasional visits to London, playing, 24 January 1715, at Drury Lane, Cassius in Julius Cæsar, appearing subsequently as Torrismond in the Spanish Friar, Hotspur, Orestes, Sylla in Caius Marius, Mithridates, &c., and the first to play the Earl of Pembroke in Nicholas Rowe's Lady Jane Grey. On 6 October 1716 he appeared at Lincoln's Inn Fields as Hamlet. Many parts of importance were assigned him. He was the original Charles Courtwell in William Bullock's Woman is a Riddle, and Sir Harry Freelove in William Taverner's Artful Husband. In 1718 he was, at Drury Lane, the original Ombre in the Masquerade by Charles Johnson, and Busiris in Edward Young's tragedy of that name.

After 1718 Elrington appears to have remained in Ireland for 10 years. On 1 October 1728, when, in consequence of the illness of Barton Booth, he reappeared as Varanes in Theodosius at Drury Lane, of which during the following season he was the mainstay. Othello, Cato, Antony, Orestes, are a few of the parts he then took. Handsome offers were made him of a permanent engagement. These he declined, stating that he was so well rewarded in Ireland for his services that no consideration would induce him to leave it. There was not a gentleman's house in Ireland, he affirmed, at which he was not a welcome visitor. After his return to Ireland he was seized with illness, while studying with a builder a plan for a new theatre, and died 22 July 1732. He was buried in St. Michan's churchyard, Dublin, near his father-in-law. His last performance was about a month earlier, as Lord Townly, for the benefit of Vanderdank.

== Reputation ==
Elrington's personal character won him high respect. In Dublin and in Ireland generally he was a great favourite. He was a good, almost a great actor. His style was to some extent founded on that of John Verbruggen. In Oroonoko he was unsurpassed. Charles Macklin spoke with rapture of his acting in the scene with Imoinda, saying that Barry himself was not always equally happy in this part. Colley Cibber did Elrington the honour to be jealous of him, never mentioning his name in the Apology. A story is told by Thomas Davies of Cibber refusing Elrington the part of Torrismond in the Spanish Friar, and resisting aristocratic pressure which was brought to bear upon him. Elrington, however, played the part so early as 1715, and was often afterwards seen in it.

Elrington was well built and proportioned, and had a voice manly, strong, and sweet. The performance in Dublin of Zanga won him the high commendation of Young, who said he had never seen the part so well done. When the London managers preferred him over the head of John Mills to the character of Bajazet, Booth said, upon the displeasure of Mills being manifested, that Elrington would make nine such actors as Mills.

Benjamin Victor says, however, that Elrington owned that the Tamerlane of Booth overpowered him, and that having never felt the force of such an actor he was not aware that it was within the power of a mortal to soar so much above him and shrink him into nothing.

Philip Highfill states "Judging from what little we know, Thomas Elrington [was] one of the most important actors alive during the transitional period between Betterton and Garrick".

== Family ==
Elrington left three sons, two of whom, Joseph and Richard, took to the stage, and a daughter, an actress, who married an actor named Wrightson. In the preface to Love and Ambition, by James Darcy, 1732, played at Dublin, mention is made of a Miss Nancy Elrington, probably the same, who played Alzeyda, "and promised to make the greatest actress that we ever had in Ireland". After Elrington's death his wife Francis appears to have been one of the managers of Smock Alley Theatre. Before his death Elrington had started a project to build a new theatre in Cork, it was completed and on 11 August 1741 Frances sold it and another one in Waterford. From the proceeds of these sales she received an annuity of £277 10s. She was still alive in 1752 and visiting the Smock Alley Theatre.
