= The Revenge (Young play) =

1721 play

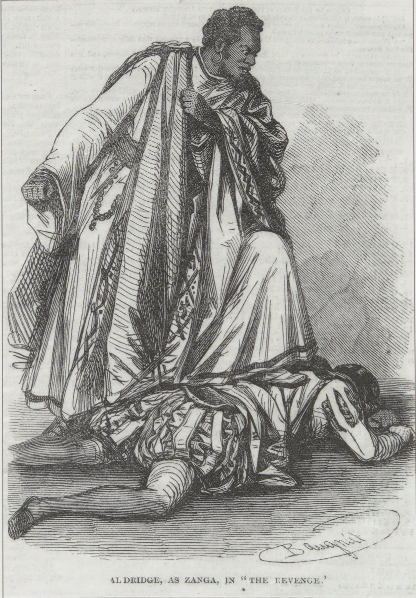
- Ira Aldridge as Zanga in "The Revenge", 1848
- Original language: English
- Written by: Edward Young
- Genre: Tragedy

Premiere
- Date: 18 April 1721
- Place: Theatre Royal, Drury Lane

The Revenge is a 1721 tragedy by the British writer Edward Young, set in a mostly undefined region of 16th-century Africa under Spanish rule. It concerns the character of Zanga, an African prince who becomes cruel after his experiences in slavery. Although initially it did not enjoy the same success as his previous play Busiris, King of Egypt, it later became a much-revived work during the eighteenth century particularly popular because of the Othello-like role of the Moorish character Zanga. John Philip Kemble revived the work briefly in 1798 before Edmund Kean in 1815 did so with great success and it became part of his repertoire.

The original Drury Lane cast included Barton Booth as Don Alonzo, Robert Wilks as Don Carlos, John Thurmond as Don Alverez, John Mills as Zanga, Mary Porter as Leonora and Christiana Horton as Isabella. The work was dedicated to Young's patron the Duke of Wharton.

The character of Zanga was portrayed by the African-American actor Ira Aldridge in 1848, and received favourable reviews, although critics were less kind to the play itself. For example, the Era said that "As Zanga he is exceedingly fine, looking the character of the Moor to perfection and acting it with great power and correctness. For the tragedy itself we have little regard."

== Bibliography ==
- Baines, Paul & Ferarro, Julian & Rogers, Pat. The Wiley-Blackwell Encyclopedia of Eighteenth-Century Writers and Writing, 1660-1789. Wiley-Blackwell, 2011.
- Burling, William J. A Checklist of New Plays and Entertainments on the London Stage, 1700-1737. Fairleigh Dickinson Univ Press, 1992.
- Kahan, Jeffrey. Shakespeare Imitations, Parodies and Forgeries, 1710-1820, Volume 1. Taylor & Francis, 2004.
- Nicoll, Allardyce. History of English Drama, 1660-1900, Volume 2. Cambridge University Press, 2009.
- Worrall, David. Harlequin Empire: Race, Ethnicity and the Drama of the Popular Enlightenment. Routledge, 2015.
