= Love at First Sight (play) =

Love At First Sight
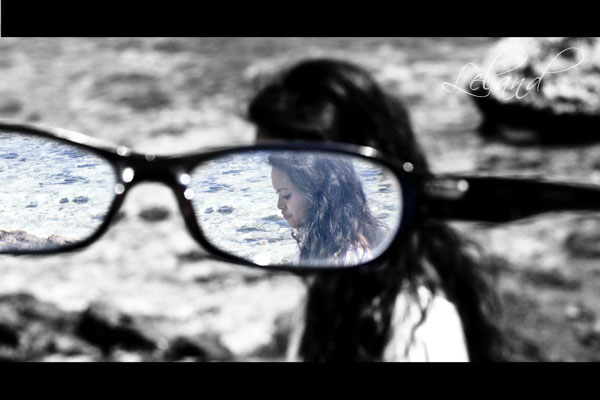
- Written by: David Crauford
- Original language: English
- Genre: Comedy

Premiere
- Date premiered: 25 March 1704
- Place premiered: Lincoln's Inn Fields Theatre

Love At First Sight is a comedy play that has been released in 1704 by the writer David Crauford. The play was written with comedy and funny ideas, But David Crauford never thought about writing Comedy play, But this time he wrote one.

It premiered at the Lincoln's Inn Fields Theatre in London. The original cast included Barton Booth as Courtly, George Powell as Lovewell, George Pack as Sir Nicholas Empty, William Fieldhouse as Gripeall, Francis Leigh as Hector, John Freeman as Jeremy, Joe Miller as Watchman, Mary Porter as Fidelia and Lucretia Bradshaw as Celinda.

== See also ==
- Love at first sight

== Bibliography ==
- Burling, William J. A Checklist of New Plays and Entertainments on the London Stage, 1700-1737. Fairleigh Dickinson Univ Press, 1992.
- Nicoll, Allardyce. A History of Early Eighteenth Century Drama: 1700-1750. CUP Archive, 1927.
