= Thomas Killigrew, the younger =

English dramatist

- Born: February 1657
- Died: 1719
- Occupation: Dramatist

Thomas Killigrew, the younger (February 1657 – 1719) was an English dramatist.

== Biography ==
Killigrew was the son of Thomas Killigrew by his second wife, Charlotte de Hesse. He was born in February 1657 (Miscell. Genealog. et Herald. new ser. i. 370). He fought a duel, according to Luttrell's Brief Relation, on 31 January 1692, and was subsequently gentleman of the bedchamber to George II when Prince of Wales.

He is the author of Chit Chat, a Comedy in five acts. As it is acted at the Theatre Royal, in Drury Lane, by his Majesties servants. Written by Mr. Killigrew, Lond., Printed for Bernard Lintot, 8vo, no date (1719). It is dedicated to the Duke of Argyll, and is a pleasant, gossiping, happily named piece, with very little plot, as the author acknowledges in the prologue, but some moderately felicitous dialogue. It was played at Drury Lane on 14 February 1719 with Wilks, Booth, Cibber, Mrs. Thurmond, Mrs. Porter, and Mrs. Oldfield in the principal parts. Thanks to the zeal of the Duke of Argyll and other friends of the author, it kept the stage eleven nights, and brought its author no less than 1,000l., which, however, he did not live to enjoy, since he died a few months afterwards, and was buried at Kensington on 21 July 1719. His play went through two editions in 1719. Miscellanea Aurea, or the Golden Medley, London, printed for A. Bettesworth, 1720, contains The Fable of Aumilius and the Statue of Venus, which is signed T. Killigrew. An agreement for the sale of Chit Chat to Bernard Lintot for 84l. was on sale by T. Thorpe in 1843.

A portrait of a ‘Captain’ Killigrew is mentioned by Nichols (viii. 722) as in Lumley Castle. It appears to be that of another Killigrew.
