= The Country Lasses =

Play by Charles Johnson

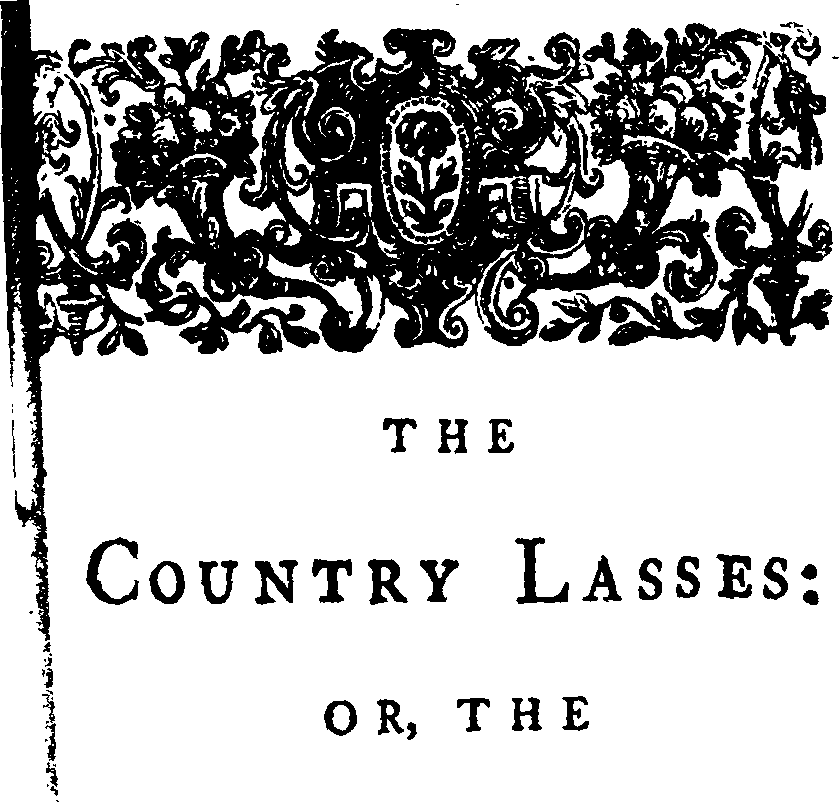
- Original language: English
- Written by: Charles Johnson
- Genre: Comedy
- Setting: Village around 40 miles from London

Premiere
- Date: 4 February 1715
- Place: Theatre Royal, Drury Lane, London

The Country Lasses: or, The Custom of the Manor is a 1715 comedy play by the British writer Charles Johnson.

The original Drury Lane cast included Robert Wilks as Modely, Barton Booth as Heartwell, John Mills as Freehold, Benjamin Johnson as Sir John English, Joe Miller as Sneak, Richard Cross as Carbuncle, Henry Norris as Tim Shacklefigure, James Quin as Vulture, Susanna Mountfort as Flora, Hester Santlow as Aura. The play was dedicated to Thomas Pelham, Earl of Clare, a Whig politician and patron of the arts.

It was a popular success and remained in the repertoire for the next century.

== Bibliography ==
- Burling, William J. A Checklist of New Plays and Entertainments on the London Stage, 1700-1737. Fairleigh Dickinson Univ Press, 1992.
- Nicoll, Allardyce. History of English Drama, 1660-1900, Volume 2. Cambridge University Press, 2009.
- Orr, Bridget. British Enlightenment Theatre: Dramatizing Difference. Cambridge University Press, 2020.
