= Edward Shuter =

English actor

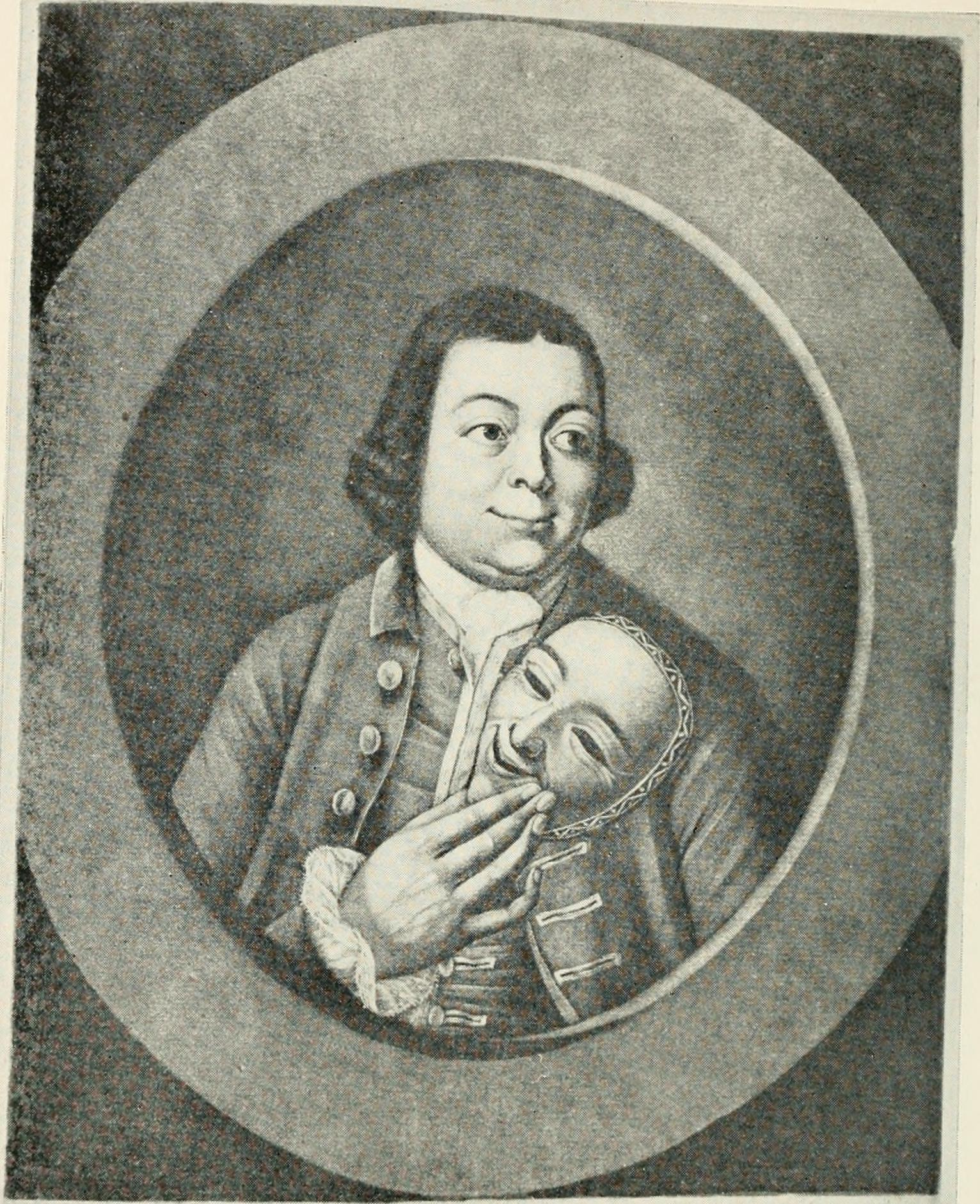
Edward Shuter, illustration from a book by Alwin Thaler (1922)

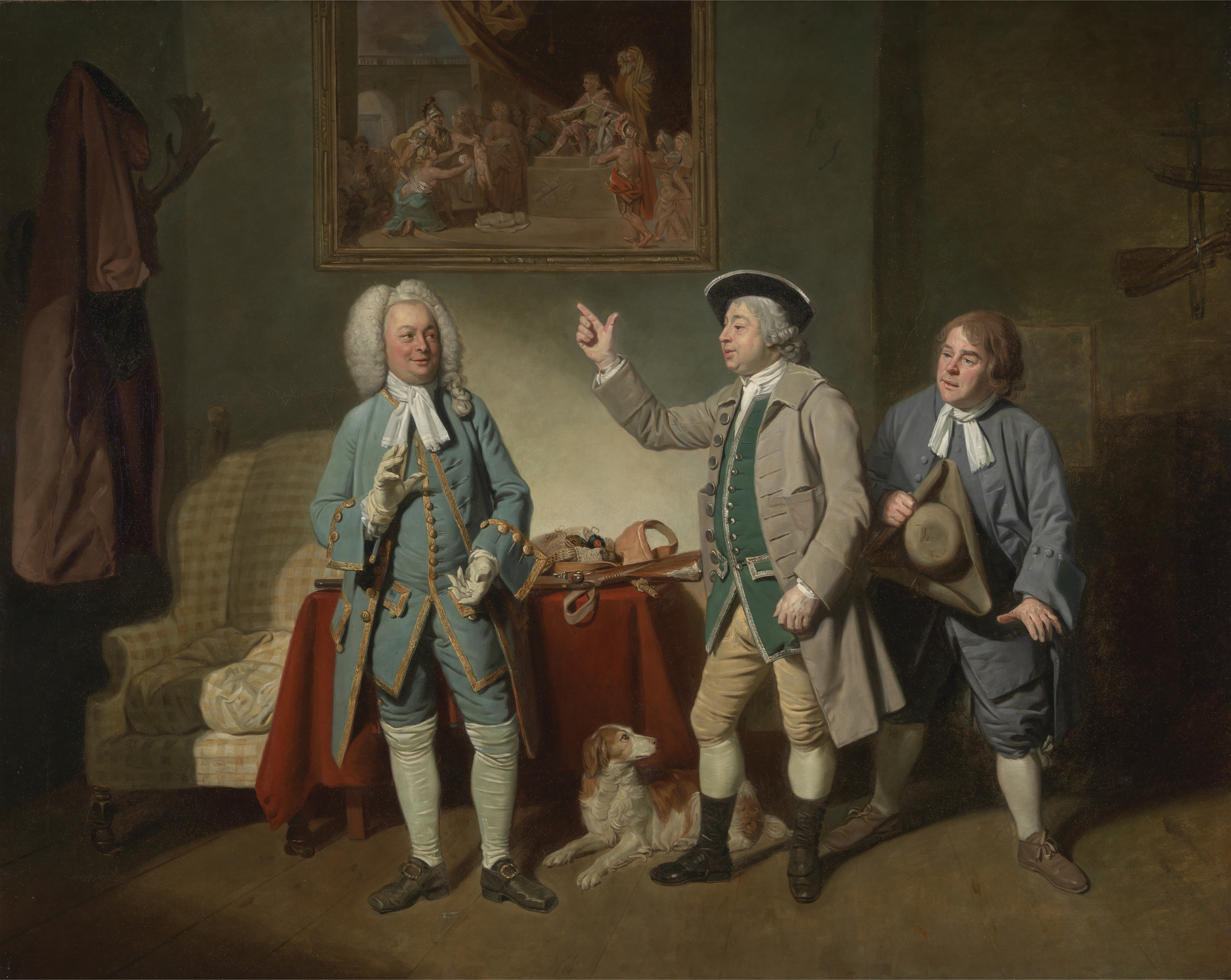
Edward Shuter as Justice Woodcock in "Love in a Village" by Isaac Bickerstaffe (Johann Zoffany, 1767)

Edward Shuter (c. 1728–1776) was an English actor.

== Life ==
Shuter was born in London to poor parents. He made his first appearance on the London stage in 1745 in Cibber's Schoolboy.

He made a great reputation in old men's parts. He was the original Justice Woodcock in Love in a Village (1762), Hardcastle in She Stoops to Conquer (1773), and Sir Anthony Absolute in The Rivals (1775).

He was buried in St. Paul's, Covent Garden.

== Portraits ==
His portrait as Scapin is in the Mathews collection in the Garrick Club; another portrait by Zoffany was engraved by Finlayson.
