= The Wife's Relief =

1711 comedy play by Charles Johnson

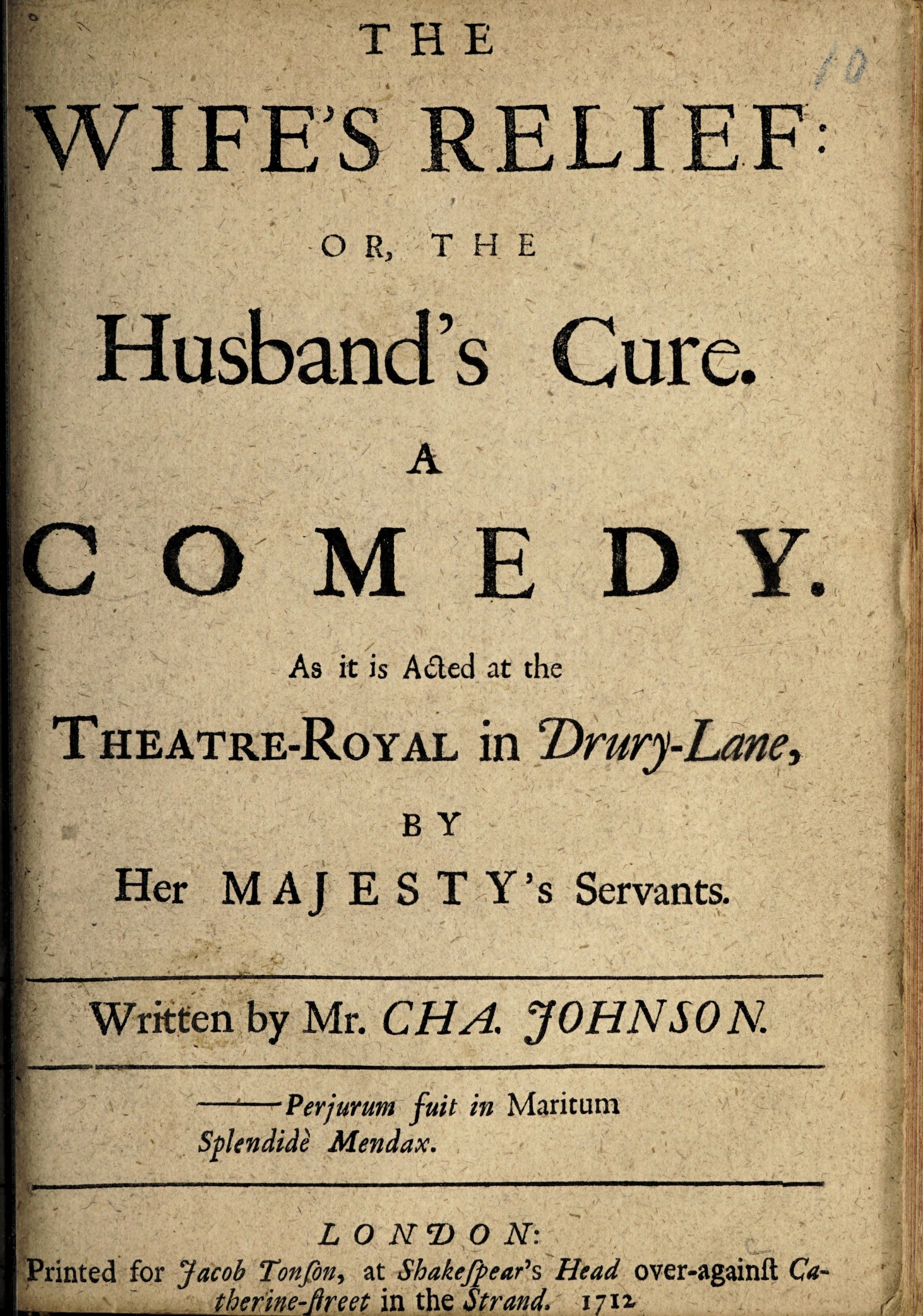
- Title page of the first edition of The Wife's Relief (1712)
- Original language: English
- Written by: Charles Johnson
- Genre: Comedy

Premiere
- Date: 12 November 1711
- Place: Drury Lane Theatre

The Wife's Relief, or, The Husband's Cure is a 1711 comedy play by the British writer Charles Johnson. The plot revolves around a virtuous wife who tries to mend her husband's rakish ways.

The cast included Robert Wilks as Volatil, Colley Cibber as Riot, Anne Oldfield as Arabella, Barton Booth as Horatio, Thomas Doggett as Sir Tristram Cash, Lacy Ryan as Valentine, Henry Norris as Spitfire, Christopher Bullock as Hazard, Mary Willis as Teraminta and Jane Rogers as Cynthia. It lasted seven nights, considered a good run for a play at the time.

== Bibliography ==
- Burling, William J. A Checklist of New Plays and Entertainments on the London Stage, 1700-1737. Fairleigh Dickinson Univ Press, 1992.
- Gollapudi, Aparna. Moral Reform in Comedy and Culture, 1696–1747. Ashgate Publishing, 2013.
- Nicoll, Allardyce. History of English Drama, 1660-1900, Volume 2. Cambridge University Press, 2009.
