= The Successful Pyrate =

Play by Charles Johnson

- Original language: English
- Written by: Charles Johnson
- Genre: Comedy

Premiere
- Date: November 7, 1712
- Place: Theatre Royal, Drury Lane

The Successful Pyrate is a play by Charles Johnson, first performed 1712, published 1713, dealing with the life of the pirate Henry Avery. It opened at the Theatre Royal, Drury Lane on 7 November 1712 and ran for five evenings. The original cast included Barton Booth as Arviragus, Robert Wilks as Aranes, John Mills as Boreal, Theophilus Keene as De Sale, William Pinkethman as Sir Gaudy Tulip, Henry Norris as Chicane, John Leigh as Jollyboy, William Bullock as Judge Bull, Christopher Bullock as Serjeant Dolt and Mary Porter as Zaida.

== Plot ==
In the play, Avery goes under the name Arviragus, and has made himself a king in Madagascar. He captures the Indian princess Zaida and tries to force her to marry him, but she is in love with a young man named Aranes. There is an offstage fight and Aranes is reported killed; meanwhile, De Sale, who has confided to the audience that he plots to overthrow Arviragus and make himself king, ingratiates himself with Zaida.

De Sale's fellow plotters are bumbling incompetents and their plans are easily thwarted, followed by a comic trial scene. It is revealed that Aranes is Arviragus' long lost son, whom he recognizes from a bracelet, and that he is still alive, his friend Alvarez having died in his place. The plotters are executed and Aranes and Zaida marry.

== Characters ==
- Arviragus, king of the island of St. Laurence, or Madagascar
- Aranes, an Omrah in Zaida's train
- Boreal, admiral to Arviragus
- De Sale, lieutenant to Arviragus
- Richardo, captain of the guards
- Piracquo, De Sale's creature
- Sir Gaudy Tulip, master of the ceremonies
- Chicane, a broken lawyer
- Jollyboy, treasurer to Arviragus
- Judge Bull
- Serjeant Dolt
- Counsellor Smooth
- Herring
- Porpoise
- Shark
- Codshead
- Zaida, Aurengzebe's granddaughter, contracted to and in love with Aranes
- Samanthe, her chief attendant
- Lydia, Piracquo's wife
- Lesbia, Tulip's wife

== Dramatic analysis ==
The Successful Pyrate is a romanticised dramatisation of two episodes contained in a pamphlet that had been recently published concerning the career of the pirate Henry Avery: his capture of the Mogul Aurengzeb's ship Gang-i-sawai, allegedly carrying the Mogul's granddaughter; and a plot against him by his lieutenant De Sale and other pirates.

The play is primarily a comedy. The pirates are mostly fools, in particular Sir Gaudy Tulip, an aged and cowardly London beau; the Gang-i-sawai is, for no reason other than comic effect, carrying two European ladies, Tulip's ex-mistress and another pirate's ex-wife, who exchange tart comments with the men; the drunken conspirators and outrageously partial court are played entirely for laughs.

== Reception ==
John Dennis condemned the play for "encouraging Villany".
