= The Governour of Cyprus =

Play by John Oldmixon

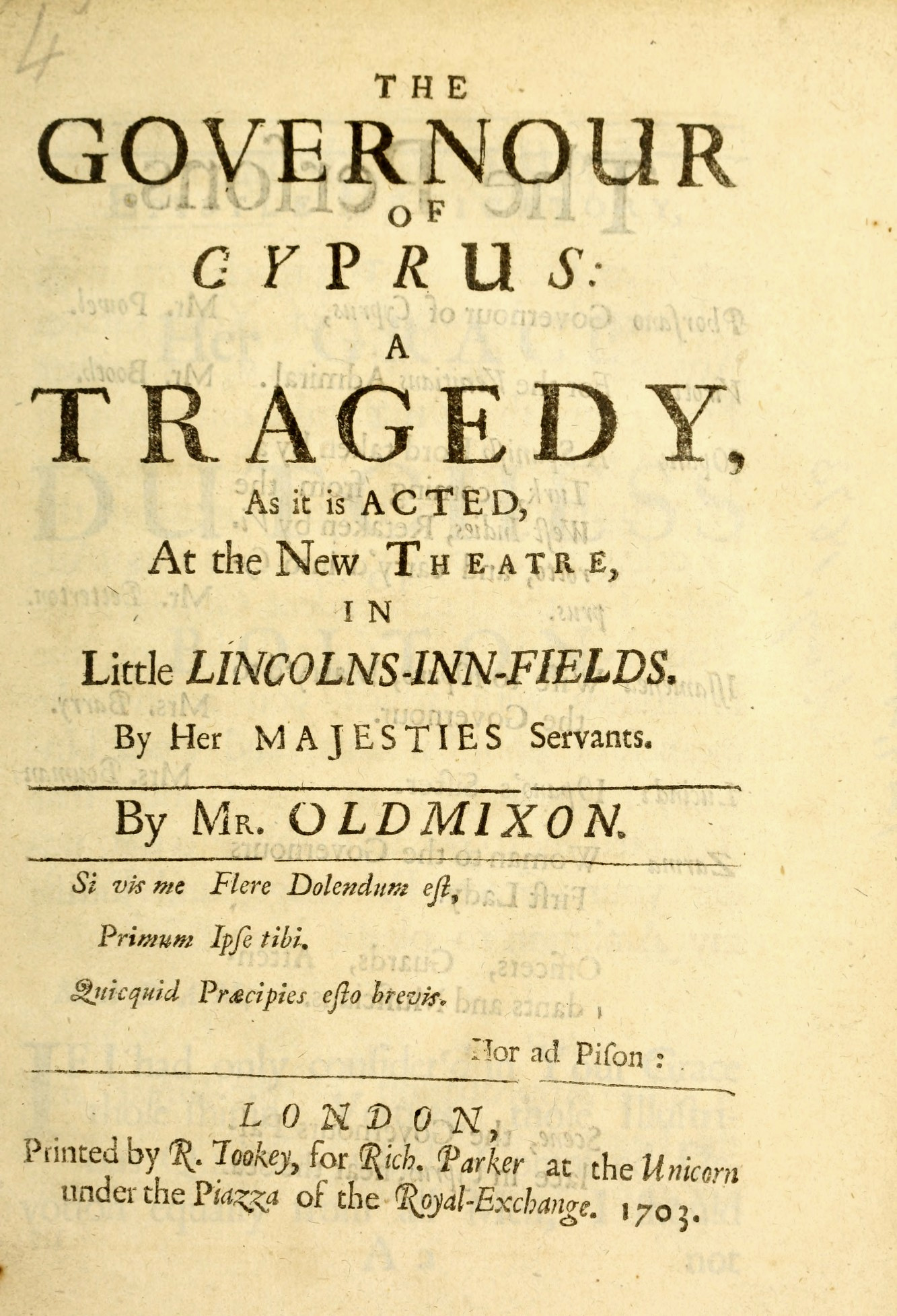
- Title page of The Governour of Cyprus (1703)
- Original language: English
- Written by: John Oldmixon
- Genre: Tragedy

Premiere
- Date: January 1703
- Place: Lincoln's Inn Fields Theatre

The Governour of Cyprus (or The Governor of Cyprus) is a 1703 play by the English writer John Oldmixon. It premiered at the Lincoln's Inn Fields Theatre in London, but the exact date was unclear with some sources putting the first performance in December 1702.

The original cast included George Powell as Phorsano, Barton Booth as Virotto, Thomas Betterton as Iopano, Elizabeth Barry as Issamenea and Elizabeth Bowman as Lucinda.

== Bibliography ==
- Burling, William J. A Checklist of New Plays and Entertainments on the London Stage, 1700-1737. Fairleigh Dickinson Univ Press, 1992.
- Nicoll, Allardyce. History of English Drama, 1660-1900, Volume 2. Cambridge University Press, 2009.
