= Lucius (play) =

1717 play

- Written by: Delarivier Manley
- Original language: English
- Genre: Tragedy
- Setting: Roman Britain, Second Century

Premiere
- Date premiered: 11 May 1717
- Place premiered: Theatre Royal, Drury Lane

Lucius or Lucius, the First Christian King of Britain is a 1717 tragedy by the British writer Delarivier Manley. It is based on the life of Lucius of Britain, the second century ruler of Britain traditionally considered to have introduced Christianity to Britain. It was Manley's final play to be staged.

It premiered at the Theatre Royal, Drury Lane on 11 May 1717 with a cast that included John Thurmond as Honorius, Lacy Ryan as Vortimer, Barton Booth as Lucius, John Mills as Arminius, John Bowman as Prince of Cambria, Anne Oldfield as Rosalinda and Christiana Horton as Emmelin.

== Bibliography ==
- Burling, William J. A Checklist of New Plays and Entertainments on the London Stage, 1700-1737. Fairleigh Dickinson Univ Press, 1992.
- Nicoll, Allardyce. History of English Drama, 1660-1900, Volume 2. Cambridge University Press, 2009.
- Hartley, Cathy. A Historical Dictionary of British Women. Routledge, 2013.
- Van Lennep, W. The London Stage, 1660-1800: Volume Two, 1700-1729. Southern Illinois University Press, 1960.
