= John Beard (tenor) =

British opera singer

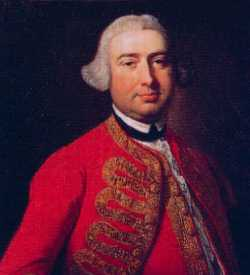
John Beard

John Beard (c. 1716 – 5 February 1791) was an English tenor of the 18th century. He is best remembered for creating an extensive number of roles in the operas and oratorios of George Frideric Handel.

Beard's date of birth and parentage are uncertain. He can first be positively identified as a boy treble in the Chapel Royal choir at the coronation of George II in 1727. An early introduction to the music of Handel occurred in 1732, when the boys in the choir took part in a semi-staged performance of Handel's Esther. Beard left the choir at Easter 1734, and immediately made his debut as a tenor in Handel's 1734 revival of his opera Il pastor fido. He continued to sing for Handel, and performed in every one of his English-language oratorios, odes, and music dramas, with the sole exception of The Choice of Hercules. He created roles in ten of Handel's operas, among them the heroic title roles of Samson, Judas Maccabeus, and Jephtha, which call for strength and expressive qualities rather than vocal agility - a revolution in the heyday of the castrato voice.

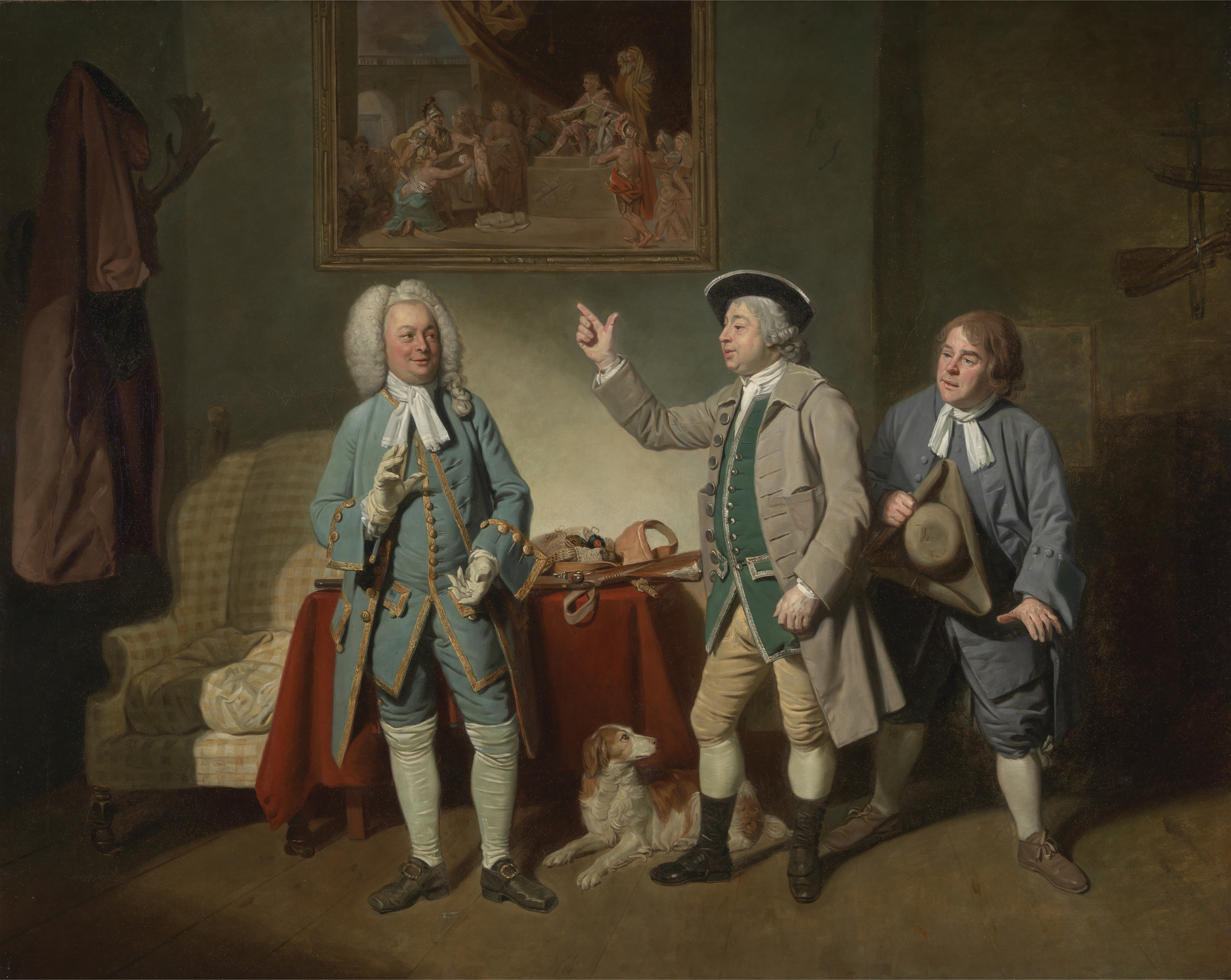
John Beard (c.) as Hawthorn in "Love in a Village" by Thomas Arne with libretto by Isaac Bickerstaffe (Johann Zoffany, 1767)

In 1762, Beard created roles in the world premieres of two of Thomas Arne's operas: Farmer Hawthorn in Love in a Village, and Artabanes in Artaxerxes. Charles Burney commented that he "constantly possessed the favour of the public by his superior conduct, knowledge of Music, and intelligence as an actor." Burney's article in Rees's Cyclopædia noted that Beard, "an energetic English singer, and an excellent actor, was brought up in the king's chapel. He knew as much of music as was necessary to sing a single part at sight, and with a voice that was more powerful than sweet, he became the most useful and favourite singer of his time, on the stage, at Ranelagh, at all concerts; and in Handel's oratorios he had always a capital part, being by his knowledge of music the most steady support of the choruses, not only of Handel, but in the odes of Greene and Boyce".

Following the defeat of the government army at the Battle of Prestonpans in September 1745 during the Jacobite rebellion, Beard was one of the quartet who sang a newly written patriotic song "God save great George our King" after a performance at Drury Lane. The song was hurriedly written by Thomas Arne, and soon became established as the British National Anthem.

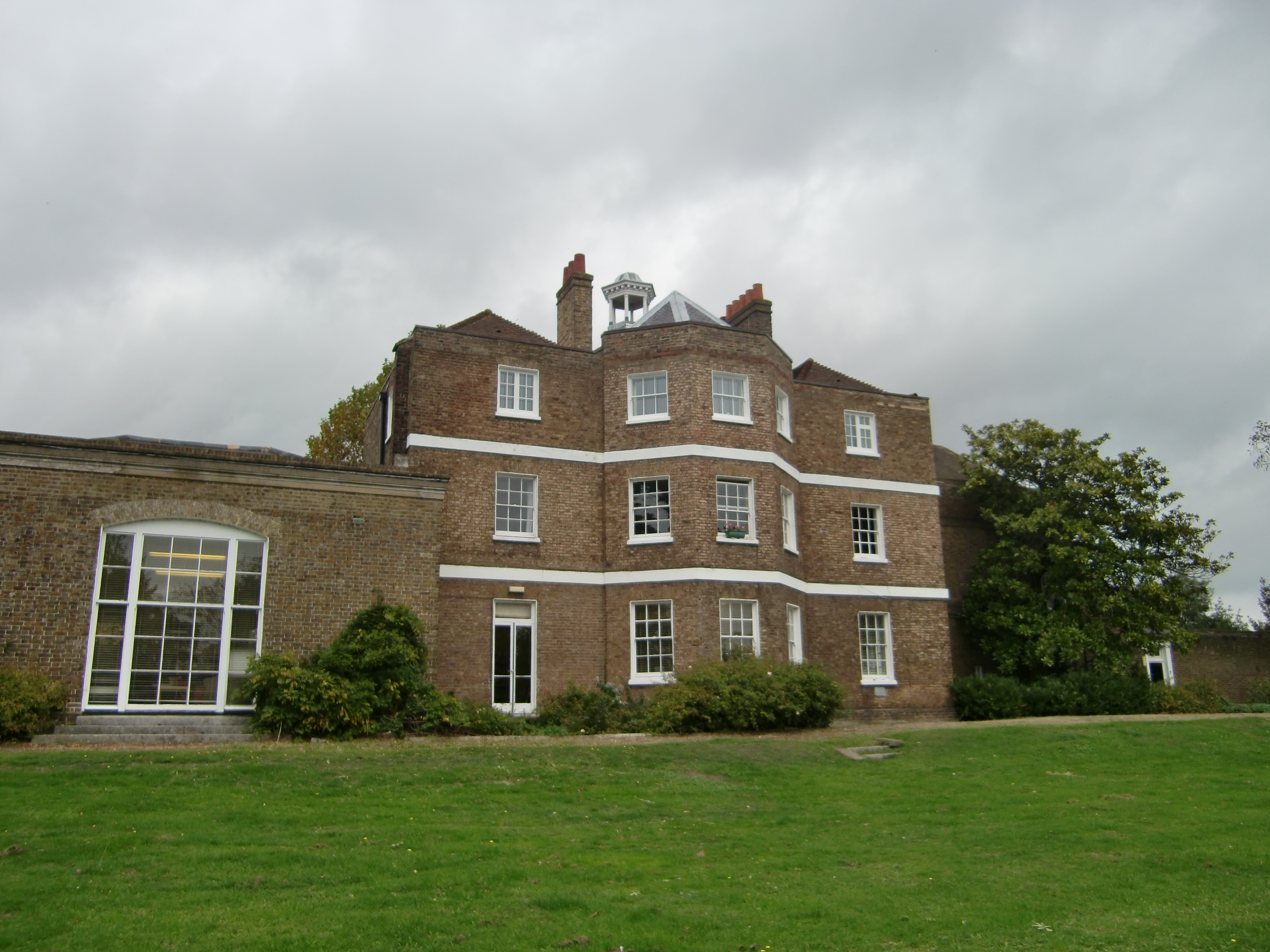
Beard's Hampton home (the extension on the left is modern)

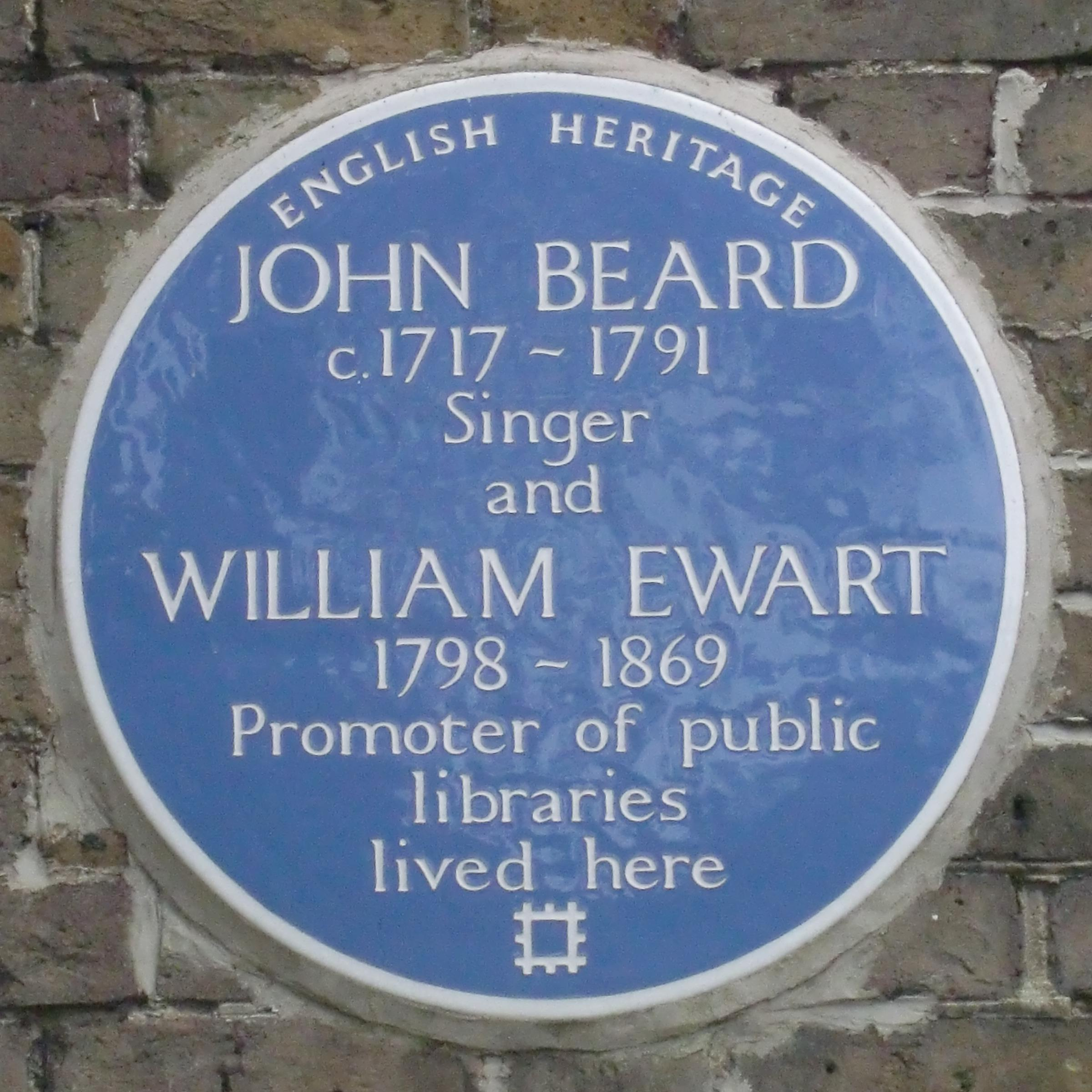
Plaque on Hampton Library to Beard, Hampton, London

In 1743, Beard became a member of the Sublime Society of Beefsteaks, founded around 1735 by John Rich, the proprietor of Covent Garden theatre, his scene painter George Lambert and William Hogarth. The members met on Saturdays at Covent Garden theatre to eat and drink, and Beard remained a member until his death. He served as President on a number of occasions.

His marriage, in January 1739, to the widow Lady Henrietta Herbert, only daughter of James Waldegrave, 1st Earl Waldegrave caused much scandal: Lord Egmont commented that "there is no prudence below the girdle". Lady Henrietta died in 1753, and in February 1758 Beard married again. His second wife was Charlotte Rich, a daughter of John Rich. After John Rich's death in 1761, Beard took over the management of Covent Garden theatre until such time as it was sold, in accordance with the terms of Rich's will. The theatre was eventually sold for £60,000 in 1767, and the money was divided equally between Rich's widow and his four daughters.

1767 was also the year when increasing deafness forced Beard to retire. He had been appointed 'Vocal performer in extraordinary' by George III in 1764, and the salary of £100 p.a. allowed him to live comfortably in retirement at Hampton, where he died in 1791.

== Bibliography ==
- HANDEL & JOHN BEARD (Paper given to the 2005 Handel Symposium)
- Jenkins, Neil: John Beard - Handel and Garrick's Favourite Tenor (Bramber: Bramber Press, 2012).
- Dean, Winton (2001). "Beard, John". In Sadie, Stanley; Tyrrell, John (eds.). The New Grove Dictionary of Music and Musicians (2nd ed.). London: Macmillan. ISBN 978-1-56159-239-5.
