= Busiris, King of Egypt =

Play by Edward Young

- Original language: English
- Written by: Edward Young
- Genre: Tragedy

Premiere
- Date: 7 March 1719
- Place: Theatre Royal, Drury Lane

Busiris, King of Egypt is a 1719 tragedy by the British writer Edward Young. It is set in Ancient Egypt during the reign of Busiris. It was considered a success, enjoying a good run and was subsequently published by Jacob Tonson. The work was dedicated to the Duke of Newcastle who as Lord Chamberlain oversaw the theatres.

The original Drury Lane cast included Thomas Elrington as Busiris, Barton Booth as Myron, John Mills as Nicanor, Robert Wilks as Memnon, Thomas Walker as Rameses, John Thurmond as Syphoces, William Mills as Auletes, Sarah Thurmond as Myris and Anne Oldfield as Mandane.

== Bibliography ==
- Baines, Paul & Ferarro, Julian & Rogers, Pat. The Wiley-Blackwell Encyclopedia of Eighteenth-Century Writers and Writing, 1660-1789. Wiley-Blackwell, 2011.
- Burling, William J. A Checklist of New Plays and Entertainments on the London Stage, 1700-1737. Fairleigh Dickinson Univ Press, 1992.
- Nicoll, Allardyce. History of English Drama, 1660-1900, Volume 2. Cambridge University Press, 2009.
