= The Sultaness =

1717 play

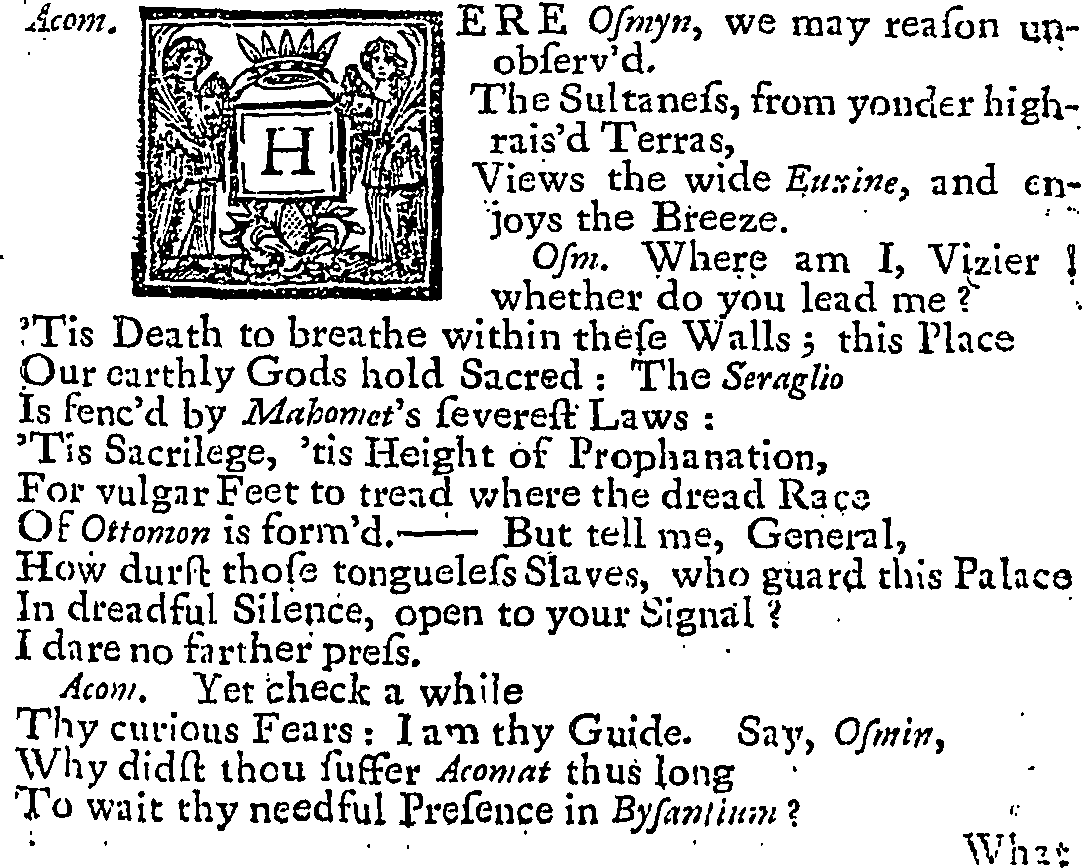
- Passage from the published version of the play
- Original language: English
- Written by: Charles Johnson
- Genre: Tragedy

Premiere
- Date: 25 February 1717
- Place: Drury Lane Theatre

The Sultaness is a 1717 tragedy by the British writer Charles Johnson. It is a reworking of the 1672 French play Bajazet by Jean Racine set in the Ottoman Empire. In common with early eighteenth century plays it places much greater emphasis on the emotional anguish of its female characters than Racine's original.

Like other plays set in Ottoman courts there may have been subtle parallels with contemporary British politics, particularly the divisions between George I and his son George, Prince of Wales. More strongly the play references the ongoing Austro-Turkish War and the role of Prince Eugene of Savoy who later that year won a major victory at the Siege of Belgrade.

The original cast included Barton Booth as Bajazet, Mary Porter as Roxana, Anne Oldfield as Atalida, John Mills as Acomat and Lacy Ryan as Osmyn. Johnson used the preface of the play to attack the recent comedy Three Hours After Marriage by John Gay and Alexander Pope, provoking a long-standing rivalry. In 1720 it was followed at Drury Lane by another oriental-set drama The Siege of Damascus by John Hughes, which took a more original approach.

== Bibliography ==
- Burling, William J. A Checklist of New Plays and Entertainments on the London Stage, 1700-1737. Fairleigh Dickinson Univ Press, 1992.
- Orr, Bridget. British Enlightenment Theatre: Dramatizing Difference. Cambridge University Press, 2020.
