= John Oldmixon =

English historian

John Oldmixon (1673 – 9 July 1742) was an English historian.

He was a son of John Oldmixon of Oldmixon, Weston-super-Mare in Somerset. He was brought up by the family of Admiral Robert Blake in Bridgwater and later became involved in trade through the port of Bristol.

His first writings were poetry and dramas, among them being Amores Britannici; Epistles Historical and Gallant (1703); and a tragedy, The Governour of Cyprus. His earliest historical work was The British Empire in America (1708), followed by The Secret History of Europe (1712–1715); Arcana Gallica, Or the Secret History of France for the Last Century (1714); and other smaller writings.

More important, although very biased, are Oldmixon's works on English history. His Critical History of England (1724–1726) contains attacks on Edward Hyde, 1st Earl of Clarendon and a defence of Bishop Gilbert Burnet, and its publication led to a controversy between Dr Zachary Grey and the author, who replied to Grey in his Clarendon and Whitlock Compared (1727). On the same lines, he wrote his History of England During the Reigns of the Royal House of Stuart (1730). Herein, he charged Francis Atterbury and other editors with tampering with the text of the History. From his exile, Atterbury replied to this charge in a Vindication, and although Oldmixon continued the controversy it is practically certain that he was in the wrong.

He completed a continuous history of England by writing the History of England During the Reigns of William and Mary, Anne and George I (1735); and the History of England During the Reigns of Henry VIII, Edward VI, Mary, and Elizabeth (1739). Among his other writings are, Memoirs of North Britain (1715), Essay on Criticism (1728) and Memoirs of the Press 1710-1740 (1742), which was published only after his death. Oldmixon had much to do with editing two periodicals, The Muses Mercury and The Medley, and he often complained that his services were overlooked by the government.

== Reception ==
Oldmixon's historical works continued to attract attention after his death. In 1744–46, James Ralph’s The History of England, During the Reigns of King William, Queen Anne, and King George I engaged critically with earlier general histories, faulting Oldmixon—alongside Burnet, Tindal, and Kennett—for derivative practices and occasional omissions.
