= The Invader of His Country =

1719 play

- Original language: English
- Written by: John Dennis
- Genre: Tragedy

Premiere
- Date: 11 November 1719
- Place: Theatre Royal, Drury Lane

The Invader of His Country, or The Fatal Resentment is a 1719 tragedy by the British writer John Dennis. It is based on Coriolanus by William Shakespeare, portraying the life of the Roman general Gaius Marcius Coriolanus. Written in the wake of the 1715 Jacobite Rebellion, it was intended by the Whig Dennis as a patriotic defence of the Hanoverian Succession by drawing parallels with Coriolanus's shift from loyal commander to rebel leader to the contemporary situation.

Originally scheduled to be staged in late 1718, it was delayed for almost a year partly due to a desire not to compete with a run of Shakespeare's Coriolanus at the rival Lincoln's Inn Fields Theatre. When it finally opened it lasted just three nights and was not a success. The leading role of Coriolanus was played by Barton Booth with John Mills, Thomas Walker, John Corey, William Wilks and Mary Porter also in the cast.

Dennis was furious with what he considered the mishandling of the play by the managers of the Drury Lane Theatre. When he published it shortly afterwards he dedicated it to the Lord Chamberlain the Duke of Newcastle who was also critical of the leadership at Drury Lane, which had supported the opposition Whigs against the Stanhope government, Dennis also made reference to both the 1717 Swedish Jacobite plot and the 1719 Rebellion in Scotland, and suggested a "conspiracy" to prevent his play's performance.

== Bibliography ==
- Burling, William J. A Checklist of New Plays and Entertainments on the London Stage, 1700-1737. Fairleigh Dickinson Univ Press, 1992.
- Cope, Kevin L. 1650-1850: Ideas, Aesthetics, and Inquiries in the Early Modern Era, Volume 25. Rutgers University Press, 2020.
- Cordner, Michael & Holland, Peter. Players, Playwrights, Playhouses: Investigating Performance, 1660–1800. Springer, 2007.
