= Tobias Hoheisel =

German-born stage designer and director (born 1956)

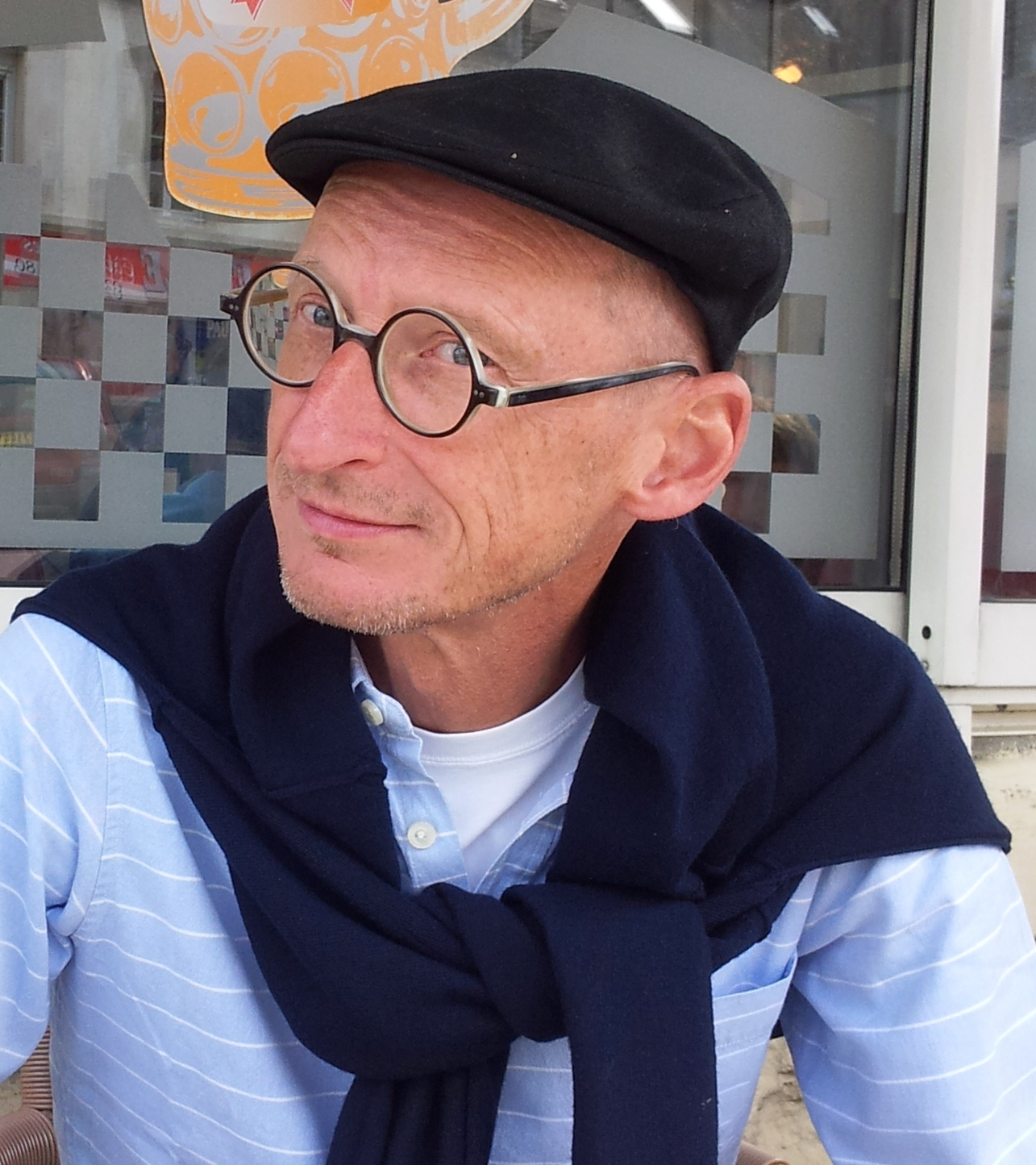
Tobias Hoheisel, 2012

Tobias Hoheisel (born 24 June 1956) is a German-born stage designer and director.

== Career ==
At Glyndebourne he designed productions of Janáček's Káťa Kabanová, The Makropulos Affair and Jenůfa, as well as Benjamin Britten's Death in Venice and Smetana's The Bartered Bride. He has designed productions for the English National Opera, The Royal Opera (Hans Werner Henze's Boulevard Solitude won the 2002 Laurence Olivier Award for best opera production), Welsh National Opera, Opera North and Scottish Opera. He has designed for many UK theatre companies including the National Theatre, the Royal Shakespeare Company (Julius Caesar, Richard III), the Almeida (Ivanov, with Ralph Fiennes) and the Royal Court. He has created productions at the Vienna State Opera, Burgtheater (including the world premiere of Peter Handke's The Hour We Knew Nothing of Each Other), Berlin State Opera, Deutsche Oper Berlin, Schaubühne am Lehniner Platz (the German premiere of Yasmina Reza's 'Art'), Cologne Opera, Nederlandse Reisopera in Enschede, Paris Opera, Gran Teatro Liceu, La Scala, Lyric Opera of Chicago, San Francisco Opera and New York City Opera, as well as the festivals at Drottningholm, Graz, Vienna, Munich, Glimmerglass, Florence and Santa Fe.

At the Edinburgh International Festival (2008) Hoheisel designed and, together with the German actress Imogen Kogge, directed Smetana's The Two Widows (which was awarded a Herald Angel).

Major influences in his work were Peter Stein and Karl-Ernst Herrmann, Luc Bondy, Robert Wilson, as well as Giorgio Strehler and Ariane Mnouchkine's Théâtre du Soleil.

== Biography ==
Hoheisel was born in Frankfurt am Main, Germany, and studied theatre design at the then Hochschule (now Universität) der Künste in Berlin, where he lived until moving to London in 1993. He was taught by Achim Freyer (set design) and Martin Rupprecht (costume design), before working as assistant to Marco Marelli. He also assisted Karl-Ernst Herrmann on two Mozart productions: Don Giovanni and La finta giardiniera at La Monnaie in Brussels.
