= Barton Booth =

British actor (1682-1733

Barton Booth (1682 – 10 May 1733) was one of the most famous British dramatic actors of the first part of the 18th century.

== Early life ==
Booth was the son of The Hon and Very Revd Dr Robert Booth, Dean of Bristol, by his first wife and distant cousin Ann Booth, daughter of Sir Robert Booth, Lord Chief Justice of Ireland, and was educated at Westminster School, where his success in the Roman comedy Andria gave him a gave him an inclination for the stage. He was intended for the church, and to attend Trinity College, Cambridge; but in 1698 he ran away and obtained employment in a theatrical company in Dublin, where he made his first appearance as the title character in Aphra Behn's Oroonoko.

== London success ==
After two seasons in Ireland he returned to London, where Thomas Betterton, who had previously failed to help him, probably out of regard for Booth's family, now gave him all the assistance in his power. At the Lincoln's Inn Fields Theatre (1700–1704) he first appeared as Maximus in Valentinian, and his success was immediate. He was at the Haymarket with Betterton from 1705 to 1708, and for the next twenty years at Drury Lane. In 1713 he joint-managed the theater with Thomas Doggett, Colley Cibber, and Robert Wilks. After his death on 10 May 1733, Booth was buried in St Laurence Cowley near Uxbridge in Middlesex. His widow had a memorial to Booth placed in Westminster Abbey in 1772. This was created by William Tyler RA.

== Roles ==
His greatest parts, after the title part of Joseph Addison's Cato, which established his reputation as a tragedian, were probably Hotspur and Brutus. His King Lear was deemed worthy of comparison with David Garrick's. As the ghost in Hamlet he is said never to have had a superior. Among his other Shakespearean roles were Mark Antony, Timon of Athens and Othello. He also played to perfection Lothario in Nicholas Rowe's The Fair Penitent. He also starred in Rowe's tragedies Ulysses (1705) as Telemachus and The Royal Convert (1707) as Hengist, King of Kent. In 1710 he starred as Athelwold in Aaron Hill's Elfrid. He starred as Coriolanus in the 1719 play The Invader of His Country by John Dennis. In 1724 he featured in John Gay's tragedy The Captives as Sophernes.

Booth was twice married; his second wife, Hester Santlow, a noted actress, survived him. He was a "poet and acholar as well as actor, and certainly a man of genius...."

== Death ==
From 1727, Booth was afflicted by ill health and in 1733 eventually called for Thomas Dover, "Doctor Quicksilver", who prescribed him quicksilver. He ingested 2 pounds of mercury and died in a week.

"I endeavour'd to divide the Rectum and tie it, but it was so rotten that it broke between my Fingers like Tinder, and sent forth a most offensive cadaverous Stench..."

The whole intestinal track on the inside was covered with black balls of mercury the size of pinheads. This famous case greatly reduced the medicinal use of elemental mercury.

== Selected roles ==
- Artaban in The Ambitious Stepmother by Nicholas Rowe (1700)
- Zueski in The Czar of Muscovy by Mary Pix (1701)
- King of Bayonne in Love's Victim by Charles Gildon (1701)
- Axalla in Tamerlane by Nicholas Rowe (1701)
- Ormandes in Antiochus the Great by Jane Wiseman (1701)
- Cleomeden in The Double Distress by Mary Pix (1701)
- Bellmein in The Beau's Duel by Susanna Centlivre (1702)
- Eugenio in The Stolen Heiress by Susanna Centlivre (1702)
- Virotto in The Governour of Cyprus by The Governour of Cyprus (1703)
- Sebastian in Love Betrayed by William Burnaby (1703)
- Valentine in The Different Widows by Mary Pix (1703)
- Captain Basil in The Stage Coach by George Farquhar (1704)
- Friendly in The Biter by Nicholas Rowe (1704)
- Courtly in Love at First Sight by David Crauford (1704)
- Telemachus in Ulysses by Nicholas Rowe (1705)
- Dick in The Confederacy by John Vanbrugh (1705)
- Sir Charles Richley in The Platonick Lady by Susanna Centlivre (1706)
- Gustavus in The Revolution of Sweden by Catharine Cockburn (1706)
- Gaylord in Adventures in Madrid by Mary Pix (1706)
- Clerimont in The Double Gallant by Colley Cibber (1707)
- Hengist, King of Kent in The Royal Convert by Nicholas Rowe (1707)
- Mirvan in The Persian Princess by Lewis Theobald (1708)
- Appius in Appius and Virginia by John Dennis (1709)
- Cunningham in The Rival Fools by Colley Cibber (1709)
- Athelwold in Elfrid by Aaron Hill (1710)
- Worthy in The Fair Quaker of Deal by Charles Shadwell (1710)
- Horatio in The Wife's Relief by Charles Johnson (1711)
- Rinaldo in The City Ramble by Elkanah Settle (1711)
- Arviragus in The Successful Pyrate by Charles Johnson (1712)
- Cato in Cato by Joseph Addison (1713)
- Captain Stanworth in The Female Advocates by William Taverner (1713)
- Welford in The Apparition by Anonymous (1713)
- Achilles in The Victim by Charles Johnson (1714)
- Lord Hastings in Jane Shore by Nicholas Rowe (1714)
- Lord Guilford Dudley in Lady Jane Grey by Nicholas Rowe (1715)
- Heartwell in The Country Lasses by Charles Johnson (1715)
- Lorenzo in The Cruel Gift by Susanna Centlivre (1716)
- Colonel Woodvil in The Non-Juror by Colley Cibber (1717)
- Lucius in Lucius by Delarivier Manley (1717)
- Bajazet in The Sultaness by Charles Johnson (1717)
- Coriolanus in The Invader of His Country by John Dennis (1719)
- Cleombrotus in The Spartan Dame by Thomas Southerne (1719)
- Myron in Busiris, King of Egypt by Edward Young (1719)
- Phyocas in The Siege of Damascus by John Hughes (1720)
- Granger in The Refusal by Colley Cibber (1721)
- Don Alonzo in The Revenge by Edward Young (1721)
- Bevil Junior in The Conscious Lovers by Richard Steele (1722)
- Vanoc in The Briton by Ambrose Philips (1722)
- Alberton in Love in a Forest by Charles Johnson (1723)
- Omphales in The Fatal Constancy by Hildebrand Jacob (1723)
- Duke of Gloucester in Humphrey, Duke of Gloucester by Ambrose Philips (1723)
- Sophernes in The Captives by John Gay (1724)
- Julius Caesar in Caesar in Egypt by Colley Cibber (1724)
- Polymnestor in Hecuba by Richard West (1726)
- Julio in Double Falsehood by Lewis Theobald (1727)

== Bibliography ==
- See Cibber, Lives and Characters of the most eminent Actors and Actresses (1753).
  - An etext version is available at the University of Virginia
- Victor, Memoirs of the Life of Barton Booth (1733).
- Winter, William. Shakespeare on the Stage. New York, Moffat, Yard and Co., 1915.
