= The Spartan Dame =

1719 play

- Original language: English
- Written by: Thomas Southerne
- Genre: Tragedy

Premiere
- Date: 11 December 1719
- Place: Theatre Royal, Drury Lane

The Spartan Dame is a 1719 tragedy by the Irish writer Thomas Southerne. It was inspired by a story from Plutarch's Life of Aegis and was originally written as early 1687, but faced a long period of censorship and revision. The Drury Lane managers chose to revive it at a time of tension with the Stanhope-led government Whigs over licensing issues, and may have selected it because its plot subtly allowed them to demonstrate sympathy with the opposition Whigs led by Robert Walpole following the recent Whig Split.

The actor-manager at Drury Lane, Colley Cibber appeared as Crites. Other members of the cast included John Mills as Leonidas, Barton Booth as Cleombrotus, Robert Wilks as Eurytion, Anne Oldfield as Celona, John Corey as Agesilius, William Mills as Mandrocles, James Oates as Thracion, and Mary Porter as Thelamia.

== Bibliography ==
- Burling, William J. A Checklist of New Plays and Entertainments on the London Stage, 1700-1737. Fairleigh Dickinson Univ Press, 1992.
- Cope, Kevin L. 1650-1850: Ideas, Aesthetics, and Inquiries in the Early Modern Era, Volume 25. Rutgers University Press, 2020.
- McGirr, Elaine M. Partial Histories: A Reappraisal of Colley Cibber. Springer, 2016.
