= Three Hours After Marriage =

1717 play

- Original language: English
- Written by: John Gay; Alexander Pope; John Arbuthnot
- Genre: Comedy

Premiere
- Date: 16 January 1717
- Place: Theatre Royal, Drury Lane

Three Hours After Marriage was a restoration comedy, written in 1717 as a collaboration between John Gay, Alexander Pope and John Arbuthnot, though Gay was the principal author. The play is best described as a satirical farce, and among its satirical targets was Richard Blackmore.

Three Hours After Marriage tells the story of Doctor Fossil, a pompous ageing scientist, who has just married a much younger woman, Mrs Townley who is then immediately beset by two rival suitors who try to win her affections. The wife and suitors then go to comical lengths to hide their intentions from Dr Fossil. The plot is complicated by the presence of a female poet Phoebe Clinket and Sir Tremendous, a literary critic.

It premiered on 16 January 1717 at the Theatre Royal, Drury Lane. The cast included Benjamin Johnson as Doctor Fossil, Anne Oldfield as Mrs Townley, Margaret Bicknell as Phoebe Clinket, Colley Cibber as Plotwell, William Penkethman as Underplot, Henry Norris as Possum, Elizabeth Willis as Prue, Thomas Walker as the First Actor, James Quin as the Second Actor and John Bowman as Sir Tremendous.

It is likely that two of the targets of the play's satire; John Woodward as Doctor Fossil and John Dennis as Sir Tremendous, would have been recognisable to London audiences due to their known hostility to Gay, Pope and the Scriblerus Club.

== Initial reception ==
The play received seven sell-out performances, then a record for the Drury Lane theatre and influenced The Author's Farce. Critical reception was less friendly. Charles Johnson, in the preface to the published version of his The Sultaness called Three Hours "Long-labour'd Nonsense" and it was also attacked in Leonard Welsted's 1717 Palaemon to Caelia, or, The Triumvirate and in the Poetical Register by Giles Jacob, who stated that it included scenes that "trespass on Female Modesty". This view of the play as obscene became the majority view, and it would not be given a major performance again until 1996.

It is likely that opponents of Pope and Gay succeeded in preventing any further performances after the initial, successful run. A probable influence on this was Richard Steele, joint manager of Drury Lane, who was a friend of Doctor John Woodward one of the major targets of the play's mockery. Steele was also likely to have been concerned by criticisms of indecency which might have threatened Drury Lane's status as a patent theatre.

== Commentary ==
Scientist Jacob Bronowski cites the play in episode Seven of the 1973 BBC television documentary series The Ascent of Man, which deals with the discoveries of Newton and Einstein: "By the time Newton was in his seventies, England under the Georges was pre-occupied in the coffee houses with gossip, money, politics, and with scandal. Nimble businessmen floated companies, to exploit fictitious inventions (most famously The South Sea Bubble). Writers poked fun at scientists, in part from spite, and in part for political motives, because Newton was a big wig in the government establishment. The group of Tories, who later helped John Gay to satirise the government in The Beggar’s Opera, also helped him, in 1717, to write the play Three Hours After Marriage". While there is scholarly consensus about the active role of Arbuthnot and Pope in Three Hours After Marriage, however, The Beggar's Opera is generally considered Gay's own work.

== Revivals ==
In 1996, Richard Cottrell directed a Royal Shakespeare Company production at the Swan Theatre. Dr. Fossil was played by Clive Francis, his new wife was played by Jane Gurnett, with her two persistent suitors Plotwell (Richard McCabe) and Underplot (Adam Godley). This production won two Laurence Olivier Awards for Best Set Designer and Best Costume Designer for Tim Goodchild in 1998.

The play was revived again in 2008 at the Union Theatre in a production by Blanche McIntyre.

== Sources ==
- RSC programme 1996
- Recording of the 1996 production in the Victoria and Albert Museum Performance Archive
