= Francis Tolson =

British writer

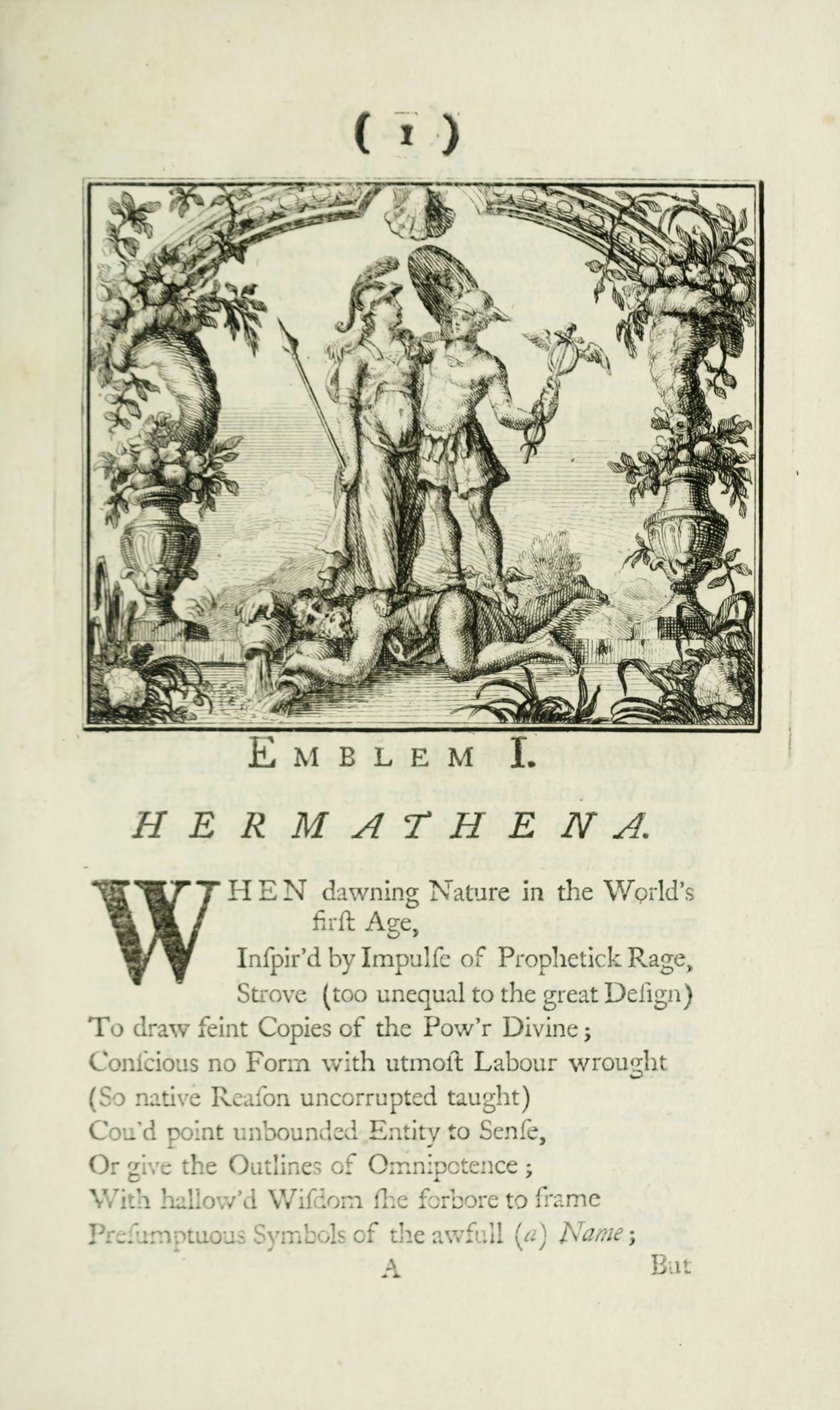
Hermathena emblem from Francis Tolson's book Hermathenæ, Or Moral Emblems, and Ethnick Tales (1740)

Francis Tolson (fl. 1719 – 1745) was an English poet, dramatist, and the author of several works. He was the Vicar of Easton Maudit and Chaplain to the Rt. Hon.ble the Earl of Sussex.

== Works ==
- Octavius Prince of Syra: Or, a Lash for Levi. A Poem (1719)
- The Earl of Warwick: Or, British Exile. A Tragedy. As it is Acted at the Theatre Royal in Drury-Lane (1719)
- A Poem on His Majesty's Passing the South-Sea Bill (1720)
- Proposals for Printing, Hermathenæ: Or, One Hundred and Twenty Moral Emblems, and Ethnick Tales. with Notes (1739)
- Hermathenæ, Or Moral Emblems, and Ethnick Tales, with Explanatory Notes (1740)
