= Tim Goodchild =

British set and costume designer

Tim Goodchild is a set and costume designer from Great Britain.

A three-time Laurence Olivier Award winner, he has designed for stage, television, and film. He has designed over 75 productions for London's West End theatre, and over 80 productions internationally. In 1988, he made theatre history by designing the first Anglo-Soviet production of a ballet: Swan Lake (Moscow Classical Ballet, London, the United States, Japan and Moscow). He also designed the ballet A Simple Man for BBC2, which won the 1987 BAFTA Award. Also for BBC2, he designed the musical The Look of Love, directed by Dame Gillian Lynne, and was costume designer for the film The Little Prince. He has designed productions for the Royal Shakespeare Company, the New Shakespeare Company, Mariinsky Theatre in St. Petersburg, English National Opera, Sydney Opera House, New York City Opera, Houston Grand Opera, Los Angeles Opera, Théatre du Chátelet in Paris, amongst others.

Most recent productions include: 2013 production of Strangers on a Train at the Gielgud Theatre (Laurence Olivier and WhatsOnStage Awards nominations for Best Production Design), The Talking Cure, written and direct by Christopher Hampton (Josefstadt, Vienna), Elf: The Musical (UK Tour), and part of the closing ceremony of the 2012 London Olympics.

West End Theatre includes: Richard II starring Ian McKellen (Piccadilly Theatre), Henry IV starring Richard Harris (Wyndham's), Our Song starring Peter O'Toole (Apollo Theatre), Bus Stop starring Jerry Hall and Sean Cassidy (Lyric), Chapter Two starring Tom Conti and Sharon Gless (Gielgud), Someone Like You, Brief Lives, Killing Jessica, and Hadrian the Seventh (Haymarket & Broadway).

For Cameron McMacintosh, he designed the original productions of Five Guys Named Moe (Broadway & Australia), Cafe Puccini, Blondel, and Hey, Mr. Producer!, as well as revivals of Oklahoma! (Palace Theatre London & Australia), My Fair Lady (Adelphi), The Card (Regent's Park Theatre & UK tour), and Little Shop of Horrors (Comedy Theatre).

For the Royal Shakespeare Company, he has designed The Taming of the Shrew, The Relapse, Xenobia, Three Hours After Marriage, and The Merry Wives of Windsor.

For Chichester Festival Theatre, he has designed Love for Love starring Derek Jacobi, Blithe Spirit starring Maureen Lipman and Dora Bryan, The School for Scandal, R Loves J by Peter Ustinov, and Robert and Elizabeth.

International productions include Antony & Cleopatra (Egyptian National Theatre, Cairo), Peter Pan (McNab Theatre, Canada), Cyrano de Bergerac (Stratford Ontario Festival Theatre, Canada), and Gigi (Volksoper, Vienna).

Opera productions include work with Chicago Lyric Opera, New York City Opera, Los Angeles Opera, English National Opera, Théâtre du Châtelet, London Coliseum, Mariinsky Opera (St. Petersburg), Sydney Opera House, Egyptian Opera (Cairo), and Houston Grand Opera.

Other productions include H.M.S. Pinafore (Broadway), Taboo (musical) starring Boy George and Matt Lucas (London and Broadway), Moon Over Buffalo starring Joan Collins and Frank Langella, We Will Rock You (13-year West End run, Australia, Spain, Las Vegas, Germany, Russia, Toronto, Italy, US and UK tour), Wonderful Town starring Maureen Lipman, Hello, Dolly! starring Danny La Rue (Prince of Wales), Gone with the Wind (Theatre Royal, Drury Lane), Pump Boys and Dinettes starring Kiki Dee, The Two Ronnies and Hans Anderson starring Tommy Steele (London Palladium), Collette starring Cleo Laine, Phil the Fluter, Salad Days, Thomas and the King, Troubadour, Sing a Rude Song starring Barbara Windsor (Garrick), Noël Coward’s Cowardy Custard, Catherine Johnson’s play Suspension, and Noël Coward’s Star Quality starring Penelope Keith.

Awards: Goodchild received a Laurence Olivier Award for his work on the Royal Shakespeare Company's production of The Relapse and in 1998 another two Olivier Awards for Best Set and Costume Design for the RSC's production of Three Hours After Marriage. For Strangers on a Train, he received Olivier Awards and WhatsOnStage Awards nomination for Best Production Design. He has received the Green Award for Best Opera Design for The Tales of Hoffmann (Australia), and was nominated for the LA Ovation Award for Best Design (Five Guys Named Moe) and a Sammy Award for Best Film Design (Fool on the Hill).

Current projects include the West End premiere of Elf: The Musical, and a new version of The Nutcracker for Houston Ballet Company in 2015-2016.
