= Edward Young =

English poet (1683–1765)

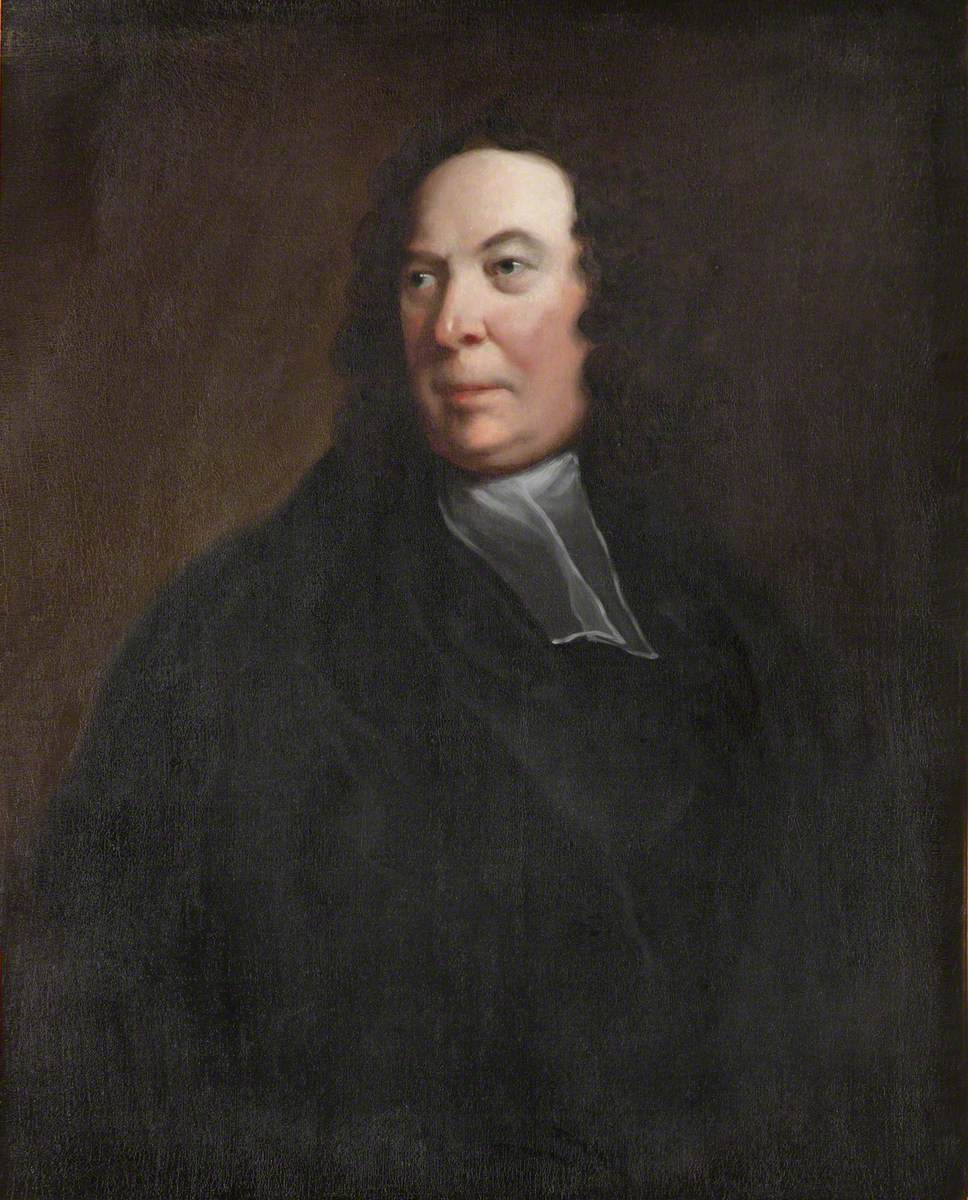
Edward Young by Joseph Highmore

Edward Young (c. 3 July 1683 – 5 April 1765) was an English poet, best remembered for Night-Thoughts, a series of philosophical writings in blank verse, reflecting his state of mind following several bereavements. It was one of the most popular poems of the century, influencing Goethe and Edmund Burke, among many others, and at the end of the century was illustrated by William Blake.

Young took holy orders, and wrote many fawning letters in search of preferment, attracting accusations of insincerity.

== Early life ==
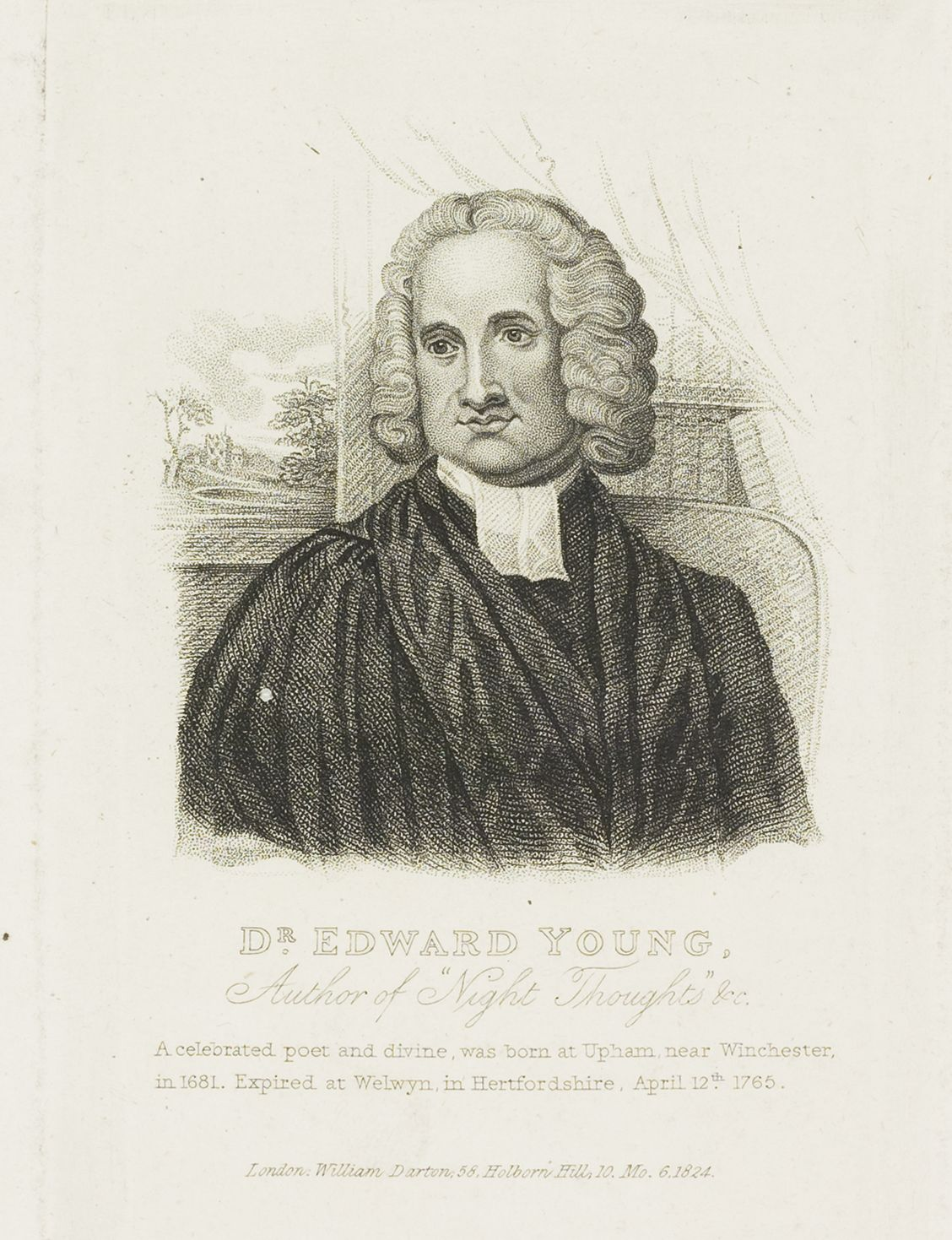
Edward Young

Young was a son of Edward Young, later Dean of Salisbury, and was born at his father's rectory at Upham, near Winchester, where he was baptised on 3 July 1683. He was educated at Winchester College, and matriculated at New College, Oxford, in 1702. He later migrated to Corpus Christi, and in 1708 was nominated by Archbishop Tenison to a law fellowship at All Souls. He took his degree of Doctor of Canon Law in 1719.

== Literary career ==
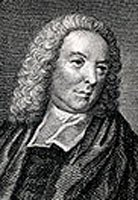
Edward Young

Young's first publication was an Epistle to ... Lord Lansdoune (1713). This was followed by a Poem on the Last Day (1713), dedicated to Queen Anne; The Force of Religion: or Vanquished Love (1714), a poem on the execution of Lady Jane Grey and her husband, dedicated to the Countess of Salisbury; and an epistle to Joseph Addison, On the late Queen's Death and His Majesty's Accession to the Throne (1714), in which he rushed to praise the new king. The fulsome style of the dedications jars with the pious tone of the poems, and they are omitted from his own edition of his works.

About this time he came into contact with Philip, Duke of Wharton, whom he accompanied to Dublin in 1717. In 1719 his play, Busiris was produced at Drury Lane, and in 1721 his The Revenge. The latter play was dedicated to Wharton, to whom it owed, said Young, its "most beautiful incident". Wharton promised him two annuities of £100 each and a sum of £600 in consideration of his expenses as a candidate for parliamentary election at Cirencester. In view of these promises Young refused two livings in the gift of All Souls College, Oxford, and sacrificed a life annuity offered by the Marquess of Exeter if he would act as tutor to his son. Wharton failed to discharge his obligations, and Young, who pleaded his case before Lord Chancellor Hardwicke in 1740, gained the annuity but not the £600. Between 1725 and 1728 Young published a series of seven satires on The Universal Passion. They were dedicated to the Duke of Dorset, George Bubb Dodington, Sir Spencer Compton, Lady Elizabeth Germain and Sir Robert Walpole, and were collected in 1728 as Love of Fame, the Universal Passion. This is qualified by Samuel Johnson as a "very great performance", and abounds in striking and pithy couplets. Herbert Croft asserted that Young made £3000 by his satires, which compensated losses he had suffered in the South Sea Bubble. In 1726 he received, through Walpole, a pension of £200 a year. To the end of his life he continued to seek preferment, but the king regarded his pension as an adequate settlement.

Young, living in a time when patronage was slowly fading out, was notable for urgently seeking patronage for his poetry, his theatrical works, and his career in the church: he failed in each area. He never received the degree of patronage that he felt his work had earned, largely because he picked patrons whose fortunes were about to turn downward.

Though his praise was often unearned, often fulsome, he could write, "False praises are the whoredoms of the pen / And prostitute fair fame to worthless men."

In 1728 Young became a royal chaplain, and in 1730 he obtained the college living of Welwyn, Hertfordshire. In 1731 he married Lady Elizabeth Lee, daughter of the 1st Earl of Lichfield. Her daughter, by a former marriage with her cousin Francis Lee, married Henry Temple, son of the 1st Viscount Palmerston. Mrs Temple died at Lyons in 1736 on her way to Nice. Her husband and Lady Elizabeth Young died in 1740. These successive deaths are supposed to be the events referred to in the Night-Thoughts as taking place "ere thrice yon moon had filled her horn."

== Night-Thoughts ==
In the preface to Night-Thoughts Young states that the occasion of the poem was real, and Philander and Narcissa have been rather rashly identified with Mr and Mrs Temple. It has also been suggested that Philander represents Thomas Tickell, an old friend of Young's, who died three months after Lady Elizabeth Young. The infidel Lorenzo was thought by some to be a sketch of Young's own son, but he was only eight years old at the time of publication. The Complaint, or Night Thoughts on Life, Death and Immortality, was published in 1742, and was followed by other "Nights," the eighth and ninth appearing in 1745. In 1753, his tragedy of The Brothers, written many years previous but suppressed because he was about to enter the Church, was produced at Drury Lane. Night-Thoughts had made him famous, but he lived in almost uninterrupted retirement. He was made clerk of the closet to the Princess Dowager, Augusta of Saxe-Gotha, in 1761. He never recovered from his wife's death. He fell out with his son, who had apparently criticised the excessive influence exerted by his housekeeper Mrs Hallows. The old man refused to see his son until shortly before he died, but left him everything. A description of him is to be found in the letters of his curate and executor, John Jones, to Dr Thomas Birch (in Brit. Lib. Addit. M/s 4311). He died at Welwyn, reconciled with his spendthrift son: "he expired a little before 11 of the clock at the night of Good Friday last, the 5th instant, and was decently buried yesterday about 6 in the afternoon" (Jones to Birch).

Young is said to have been a brilliant talker. Although Night-Thoughts is long and disconnected, it abounds in brilliant isolated passages. Its success was enormous. It was translated into French, German, Italian, Spanish, Portuguese, Swedish, Russian, Welsh, Polish and Magyar. In France it became a classic of the romantic school. Questions as to the "sincerity" of the poet did arise in the 100 years after his death. The publication of fawning letters from Young seeking preferment led many readers to question the poet's sincerity. In a famous essay, Worldliness and Other-Worldliness, George Eliot discussed his "radical insincerity as a poetic artist." If Young did not invent "melancholy and moonlight" in literature, he did much to spread the fashionable taste for them. Madame Klopstock thought the king ought to make him Archbishop of Canterbury, and some German critics preferred him to John Milton. Young's essay, Conjectures on Original Composition, was popular and influential on the continent, especially among Germans, as a testament advocating originality over neoclassical imitation. Young wrote good blank verse, and Samuel Johnson pronounced Night-Thoughts to be one of "the few poems" in which blank verse could not be changed for rhyme but with disadvantage. The poem was a poetic treatment of sublimity and had a profound influence on the young Edmund Burke, whose philosophic investigations and writings on the Sublime and the Beautiful were a pivotal turn in 18th-century aesthetic theory.

Young's masterpiece Night-Thoughts emerged from obscurity by being mentioned in Edmund Blunden's World War One memoir, Undertones of War (1928), as a source of comfort during time in the trenches. This latter work emerged from the darkness of the more recent past thanks to its mention and discussion in Paul Fussell's The Great War and Modern Memory (1975), which discussed Blunden's reliance on Night-Thoughts. Blunden's mention of Young's poem reintroduced an interesting, sometimes bombastic precursor to the early Romantics to students of English literature.

Samuel Richardson in a letter to bookseller Andrew Millar discussed a new edition of Young's poem, Night-Thoughts (1750), which was already very popular, and which would become one of the most frequently-printed poems of the eighteenth century. Millar had purchased the copyright to the second volume of Night-Thoughts (parts 7–11) from Young for £63 on 7 April 1749; the edition under discussion was the first in which Millar was involved, and it would be advertised for sale in the General Advertiser on 30 January 1750.

William Hutchinson included a gloss on Night-Thoughts in his series of lectures The Spirit of Masonry (1775), underlining the masonic symbolism of the text.

== Influence on romanticism ==
I would compare genius to virtue, and learning to riches. As riches are most wanted where there is least virtue; so learning where there is least genius. As virtue without much riches can give happiness, so genius without much learning can give renown... Learning is borrowed knowledge; genius is knowledge innate, and quite our own.

— Edward Young, Conjectures on original composition

In 1759, at the age of 76, he published a piece of critical prose under the title of Conjectures on Original Composition which put forward the vital doctrine of the superiority of "genius," of innate originality being more valuable than classic indoctrination or imitation, and suggested that modern writers might dare to rival or even surpass the "ancients" of Greece and Rome.

The Conjectures was a declaration of independence against the tyranny of classicism and was at once acclaimed as such becoming a milestone in the history of English, and European, literary criticism. It was immediately translated into German at Leipzig and at Hamburg and was widely and favourably reviewed. The cult of genius exactly suited the ideas of the Sturm und Drang movement and gave a new impetus to the cult of Young’ (Harold Forster, ‘Some uncollected authors XLV: Edward Young in translation I’).

The young Goethe told his sister in 1766 that he was learning English from Young and Milton, and in his autobiography he confessed that Young's influence had created the atmosphere in which there was such a universal response to his seminal work The Sorrows of Young Werther. Young's name soon became a battle-cry for the young men of the Sturm und Drang movement. Young himself reinforced his reputation as a pioneer of romanticism by precept as well as by example.

== Clerical career ==
Young was forty-seven when he took holy orders. It was reported that the author of Night-Thoughts was not, in his earlier days, "the ornament to religion and morality which he afterwards became", and his friendships with the Duke of Wharton and with Dodington did not improve his reputation. A statement attributed to Alexander Pope is that: "He had much of a sublime genius, though without common sense; so that his genius, having no guide, was perpetually liable to degenerate into bombast. This made him pass a foolish youth, the sport of peers and poets; but his having a very good heart enabled him to support the clerical character when he assumed it, first with decency and afterwards with honour" (O Ruffhead, Life of A. Pope, p. 291).

== Other works ==
Other works by Young are:

- Busiris, King of Egypt (1719), a play
- The Revenge (1721), a play
- The Instalment (to Sir R. Walpole, 1726)
- Cynthio (1727)
- The Brothers (1728), a play
- A Vindication of Providence ... (1728), a sermon
- An Apology for Punch (1729), a sermon
- Imperium Pelagi, a Naval Lyrick ... (1730)
- Two Epistles to Mr Pope concerning the Authors of the Age (1730)
- A Sea-Piece ... (1733)
- The Foreign Address, or The Best Argument for Peace (1734)
- The Centaur not Fabulous; in Five Letters to a Friend (1755)
- An Argument ... for the Truth of His [Christ's] Religion (1758), a sermon preached before the king
- Conjectures on Original Composition ... (1759), addressed to Samuel Richardson
- Resignation ... (1762), a poem.

Night-Thoughts was illustrated by William Blake in 1797, and by Thomas Stothard in 1799. The Poetical Works of the Rev. Edward Young ... were revised by himself for publication, and a completed edition appeared in 1778. The Complete Works, Poetry and Prose, of the Rev. Edward Young ..., with a life by John Doran, appeared in 1854. Sir Herbert Croft wrote the life included in Johnson's Lives of the Poets, but the critical remarks are by Johnson. Selections from Night-Thoughts was also set by New England Congregationalist composer William Billings in his Easter Anthem.
