= Joe Miller (actor) =

English actor

Joe Miller's Jests, or the Wits Vade-Mecum (1739)

Joseph Miller (1684 – 15 August 1738) was an English actor, who first appeared in the cast of Sir Robert Howard's Committee at Drury Lane in 1709 as Teague.

Trinculo in The Tempest, the First Grave-digger in Hamlet and Marplot in Susanna Centlivre's The Busybody, were among his many favourite parts. He is said to have been a friend of Hogarth.

In 1715 he appeared on bills promoting a performance on the last day of April, where he played Young Clincher in Farquhar's comedy, The Constant Couple.

On 25 April 1717 he played Sir Joseph Whittol in William Congreve's "Old Batchelor". Tickets for this performance were adorned by a design by William Hogarth showing the scene where Whittol's friend Captain Bluffe is kicked by Sharper while his friend Bellmour tries to pull him away. This is described as a "very valuable engraving" in 1868. This ticket design was used for Joe Millers benefit performance on 13 April 1738.

In "vacation periods" between working at Drury Lane, he performed for William Pinkethman's company.

He frequented the "Black Jack" tavern on Portsmouth Street in London, which was a favourite of the Drury Lane players and those from Lincoln's Inn Fields. Allegedly he was very serious in the bar and this led to an in-joke whereby all his companions ascribed all new jokes to him.

His final performance was on 13 April 1738.

On his death on 15 August he was buried at St Clement Danes on Portugal Street, London. This churchyard was later built over by King's College Hospital. The grave is therefore lost.

== Joe Miller's Jests ==
After Miller's death, John Mottley (1692–1750) brought out a book called Joe Miller's Jests, or the Wits Vade-Mecum (1739), published under the pseudonym of Elijah Jenkins Esq. at the price of one shilling. This was a collection of contemporary and ancient coarse witticisms, only three of which are told of Miller. This first edition was a thin pamphlet of 247 numbered jokes. This ran to three editions in its first year.

Later (not wholly connected) versions were entitled with names such as "Joe Miller's Joke Book", and "The New Joe Miller" to latch onto the popularity of both Joe Miller himself and the popularity of Mottley's first book. Joke books of this format (i.e. "Mr Smith's Jests") were common even before this date. It was common practice to learn one or two jokes for use at parties etc.

Owing to the low quality of the jokes in Mottley's book, their number increasing with each of the many subsequent editions, any time-worn jest came to be called "a Joe Miller", a Joe-Millerism, or simply a Millerism.

Joke 99 states:

A Lady's Age happening to be questioned, she affirmed she was but Forty, and called upon a Gentleman that was in Company for his Opinion; Cousin, said she, do you believe I am in the Right, when I say I am but Forty? I ought not to dispute it, Madam, reply'd he, for I have heard you say so these ten Years.

Joke 234 speaks of:

A famous teacher of Arithmetick, who had long been married without being able to get his Wife with Child. One said to her 'Madam, your Husband is an excellent Arithmetician'. 'Yes, replies she, only he can't multiply.'

== Other references to Miller ==
Joe Miller was referred to in Charles Dickens' A Christmas Carol (1843), by the character Scrooge, who remarks "Joe Miller never made such a joke as sending [the turkey] to Bob's will be!" Dickens also references Joe-Millerism in Sketches by Boz, in chapter 1 of The Boarding-house.

George Grossmith and Weedon Grossmith's 1892 comic novel, The Diary of a Nobody also makes reference to Joe Miller when Lupin, son of the chief protagonist and diary writer, Mr. Pooter, sarcastically states, "Bravo Joe Miller" in response to one of Mr. Pooter's failed jokes.

Joe Miller was also referred to in James Joyce's "Ulysses" (1922) in the limerick that Lenehan whispers during the Aeolus episode to Stephen Dedalus, the last line of which is "I can't see the Joe Miller. Can you?".

Isaac Asimov refers to Joe Miller's joke book on page 552 of Asimov's Guide to Shakespeare. The work is used in his explanation of Beatrice's barb toward Benedick in Much Ado About Nothing—Act II, scene i, lines 128–130.

According to Leonard Feinberg, the 1734 edition contains one of the oldest examples of gallows humor.

In the 1940 short film, One for the Book, in which characters emerge from famous books, one of the characters is Joe Miller, emerging from his joke book.

The 1948 Merrie Melodies cartoon Daffy Dilly, the character Daffy Duck works as a street vendor selling, among other items, copies of a Joe Miller joke book.

According to biographer Carl Sandburg, Abraham Lincoln read Joe Miller and "repeated some of the jokes though he had a thousand fresher ones of his own."
