= Sarah Thurmond =

British actress

- Born: Sarah Lewis; Epsom
- Died: 1762
- Partner: John Thurmond
- Children: Mary and Catherine

Sarah Thurmond (born Sarah Lewis; died 1762) was a British actress.

== Life ==
Sarah Lewis was born in Epsom although the date is unknown. Her first appearances were at Drury Lane and Lincoln's Inn Fields at the end of 1711 in Greenwich where she met John Thurmond, son of the actor John Thurmond the Elder. They were married and Sarah went to Dublin where her in-laws John and Winifred Thurmond were acting and she appeared at the Smock Alley Theatre. In 1718 they were at the Drury Lane Theatre where she took leading roles and her husband was the dancing master. In 1723 her husband's play Harlequin Doctor Faustus which has been noted as England's first pantomime, was performed at Drury Lane.

In 1732, they both moved to the Goodman's Fields Theatre. Two years later she returned to Drury Lane making her final performance in 1737.
