= Charles Johnson (writer) =

17th/18th-century English playwright and tavern keeper

Charles Johnson (1679 – 11 March 1748) was an English playwright, tavern keeper, and enemy of Alexander Pope's. He was a dedicated Whig who allied himself with the Duke of Marlborough, Colley Cibber, and those who rose in opposition to Queen Anne's Tory ministry of 1710–1714.

Johnson claimed to be trained in the law, but there is no evidence of his membership in any of the Inns of Court. At the same time, it is possible that he was a lawyer, as his first two published works, in 1704 and 1705 (Marlborough; on the Late Glorious Victory Near Hochstet in Germany and The Queen; a Pindaric Ode) had him living in Gray's Inn, and he married a Mary Bradbury in Gray's Inn chapel in 1709, the year of his first play, Love and Liberty (unproduced).

Some time around 1710, he became friends with the actor-manager of Drury Lane Theatre, Robert Wilks, and Wilks ensured that Johnson's plays received consideration. In 1711, The Wife's Relief was a great success. The play starred Colley Cibber, Robert Wilks, Thomas Doggett, and Anne Oldfield. He received £300 for the play, and it remained in print for two decades. In 1712, The Successful Pyrate was acted, and John Dennis complained to Charles Killigrew, Master of the Revels that the play glamorized the pirate Henry Every. Nevertheless, the play's controversy helped its attendance, and it was a theatrical success.

After the Hanoverian succession in 1715, when the whigs were ascendant, Johnson had his greatest success with The Country Lasses. It was acted in repertoire until 1813, and it had six editions and two adaptations by 1779. Furthermore, it was used as a test case for Drury Lane. The managers claimed that they needed no license from the master of revels, and they presented The Country Lasses without license. The play is sentimental, affectionate, and nostalgic, with little of the sexuality or raillery of earlier comedies.

The next year, Johnson was more overtly political with The Cobler of Preston, which was a play about the Jacobite rising of 1715. In 1717, he wrote The Sultaness, a tragedy, and in the preface to the printed play, he satirized the recent Three Hours after Marriage as "Long-labour'd Nonsense." That play had been written by John Gay, Alexander Pope, and John Arbuthnot, and Pope repaid Johnson with interest in the 1728 The Dunciad, where he deplores

"A past, vamp'd, future, old, reviv'd, new piece,
'Twixt Plautus, Fletcher, Congreve, and Corneille,
(That) Can make a Cibber, Johnson, or Ozell." (I. 235-40)

Johnson was therefore lumped in with his much more political theatrical manager, Cibber, and the overtly political accountant, John Ozell. In comparison with those two individuals, Johnson was an innocent.

In 1719 his The Masquerade was performed at the Drury Lane Theatre. Johnson's next play was a comedy The Female Fortune Teller from 1726. In 1729 he produced a ballad opera The Village Opera followed by the tragedy Medea in 1730, and his last play was Caelia, which was a comedy that failed so badly that it was withdrawn early. In the preface to Medea, Johnson replied to Pope, admitting that Pope was a better poet but complaining of the pettiness shown by Pope's treatment of those who offended him. It is possible that during these decades Johnson was already engaged in other business. He ran a tavern in Bow Street, Covent Garden. He died in 1748.

His plays emphasize tragic female characters (a late version of the she-tragedy), and contemporary accounts suggest that he was an extremely friendly and inoffensive individual. He was personally corpulent, and one biographer suggested that he was attacked in The Dunciad simply for being too large a target to avoid. Johnson's remarks in Medea show that he was personally very surprised and sorry to be mentioned in The Dunciad.

== Plays ==
- The Force of Friendship (1710)
- The Generous Husband (1711)
- The Wife's Relief (1711)
- The Successful Pyrate (1712)
- The Victim (1714)
- The Country Lasses (1715)
- The Cobler of Preston (1716)
- The Sultaness (1717)
- The Masquerade (1719)
- Love in a Forest (1723)
- The Female Fortune Teller (1726)
- The Village Opera (1729)
- Medea (1730)
- Caelia (1731)

== See also ==
- Daniel Defoe
- Jonathan Swift
- Nathaniel Mist
