= The Battles of Talavera =

1809 poem by John Wilson Croker

- by John Wilson Croker
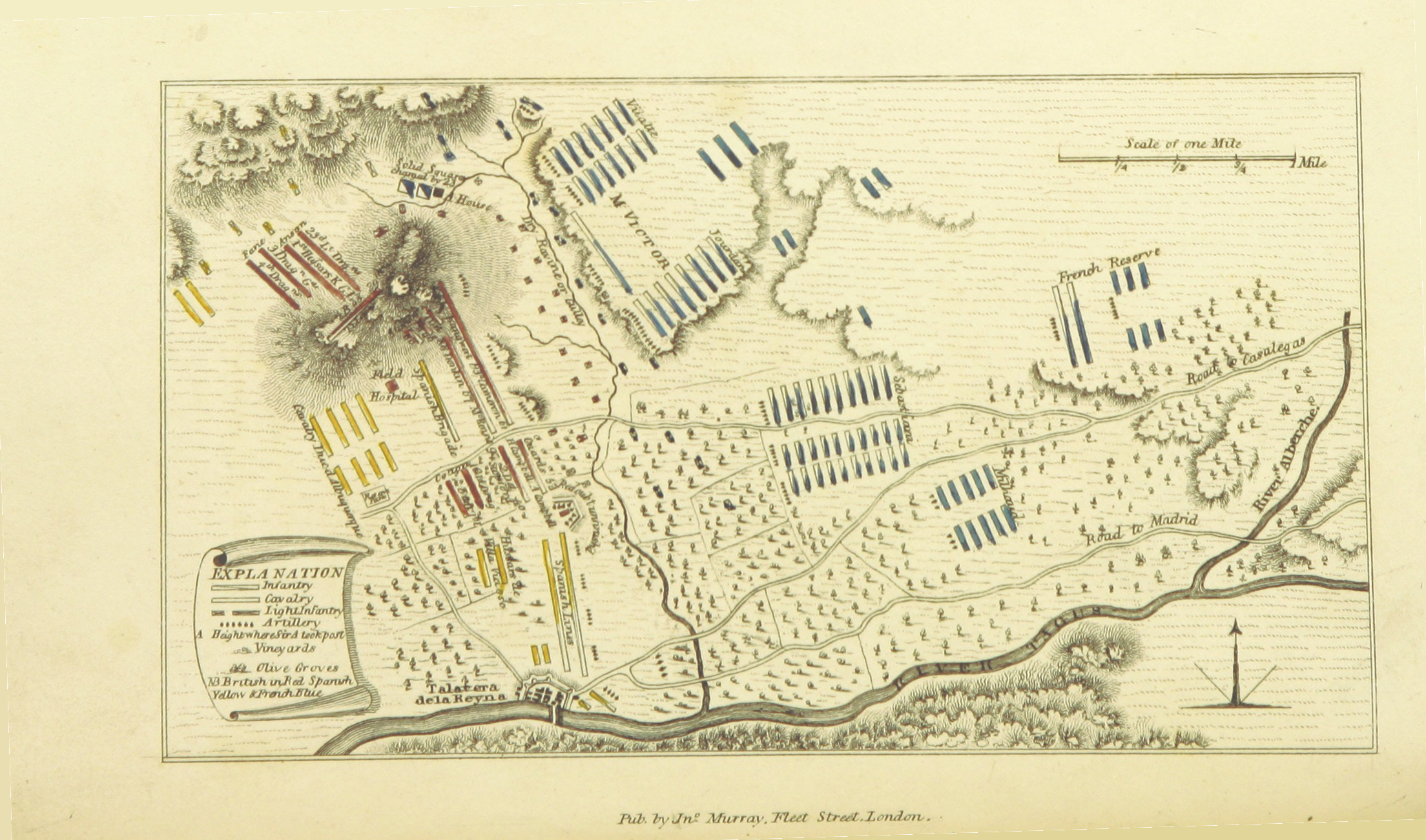
- Map of battle from sixth edition.
- Language: English
- Publisher: John Murray
- Pages: 37

The Battles of Talavera is an 1809 poem by the Irish writer John Wilson Croker. It was written in commemoration of the Battle of Talavera, where Sir Arthur Wellesley led an Allied force of British, Portuguese and Spanish troops to a victory over the French in the Peninsular War. The victory led to popular celebrations in Britain and Wellesley was made Lord Wellington.

As well as his literary interests, Croker was a Tory politician who served for many years of Secretary to the Admiralty. He modelled the work on Walter Scott's 1808 poem Marmion about the Battle of Flodden. It sold very well and went through eight editions by April 1810. The publisher John Murray said it had achieved more success than any other short poem he knew. Croker later became a close associate of his fellow Irishman, now Duke of Wellington, following the end of the Napoleonic Wars.

== See also ==
- A Poem Upon the Late Glorious Successes, a 1707 work by Nicholas Rowe commemorating the Battle of Ramillies.

== Bibliography ==
- Bainbridge, Simon. British Poetry and the Revolutionary and Napoleonic Wars: Visions of Conflict. Oxford University Press, 2003.
- Brightfield, Myron Franklin. John Wilson Croker. University of California Press, 1940
- Muir, Rory. Wellington: The Path to Victory, 1769–1814. Yale University Press, 2013.
