= John Murray (publisher, born 1778) =

Scottish publisher (1778–1843)

John Murray II
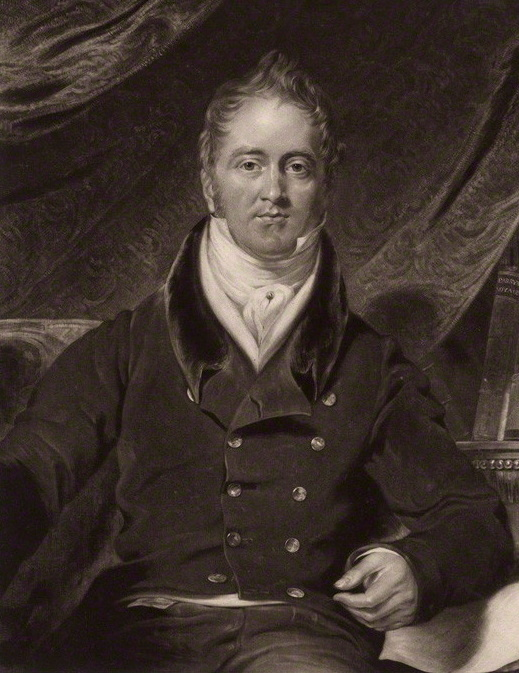
- Mezzotint portrait of Murray
- Born: John Samuel Murray; November 27, 1778; London, England
- Died: June 27, 1843 (aged 64)
- Occupation: Publisher
- Spouse: Anne Elliot (Note: Daughter of Edinburgh publisher and bookseller Charles Elliot.) (m. 1807)
- Children: John Murray III
- Father: John Murray

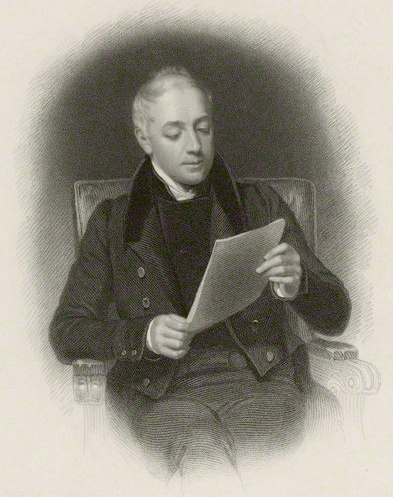
John Murray

John Murray (27 November 1778 – 27 June 1843) was a Scottish publisher and member of the John Murray publishing house. He published works by authors such as Sir Walter Scott, Lord Byron, Jane Austen and Maria Rundell.

== Life ==
The publishing house was founded by Murray's father, who died when Murray was only fifteen years old. During his adolescence, he ran the business with a partner Samuel Highley, but in 1803 the partnership was dissolved. Murray soon began to show the courage in literary speculation which earned for him later the name given him by Lord Byron of "the Anak of publishers", a reference to Anak in the Book of Numbers.

In 1807 Murray took a share with Archibald Constable in publishing Sir Walter Scott's Marmion. In the same year, he became part-owner of the Edinburgh Review, although with the help of George Canning he launched in opposition the Quarterly Review in 1809, with William Gifford as its editor, and Scott, Canning, Robert Southey, John Hookham Frere and John Wilson Croker among its earliest contributors. He published Croker's popular poem The Battles of Talavera in 1809. Murray was closely cooperated with Constable, but ended the association in 1813 due to Constable's business methods that did not work properly.

In 1811, the first two cantos of Lord Byron's Childe Harold were brought to Murray by Robert Charles Dallas, to whom Byron had presented them. Murray paid Dallas 500 guineas for the copyright. In 1812, he bought the publishing business of William Miller (1769–1844), and migrated to 50 Albemarle Street. Literary London flocked to his house and Murray became the centre of the publishing world, regularly hosting meetings between authors and friends in his drawing-room. It was in his drawing-room that Scott and Byron first met, and here, in 1824, after the death of Lord Byron, that the manuscript of his memoirs, considered by Gifford unfit for publication, was destroyed. A close friendship existed between Byron and his publisher, but for political reasons business relations ceased after the publication of the fifth canto of Don Juan. Murray paid Byron some £20,000 for his various poems. To Thomas Moore he gave nearly £5,000 for writing the life of Byron, and to George Crabbe £3,000 for Tales of the Hall.

== In fiction ==
The character Prester John in John Paterson's Mare, James Hogg's allegorical satire on the Edinburgh publishing scene, is based on John Murray.

He is a supporting character in Susanna Clarke's novel Jonathan Strange & Mr Norrell, and is played by John Sessions in its television adaptation.

Murray features as a character in Sara Sheridan's Wilbur Smith Prize-shortlisted novel On Starlit Seas (2025) as the publisher of Maria Graham.

== See also ==
- Murray's Family Library
