= The Lady of the Lake (poem) =

Narrative poem by Sir Walter Scott

- by Walter Scott
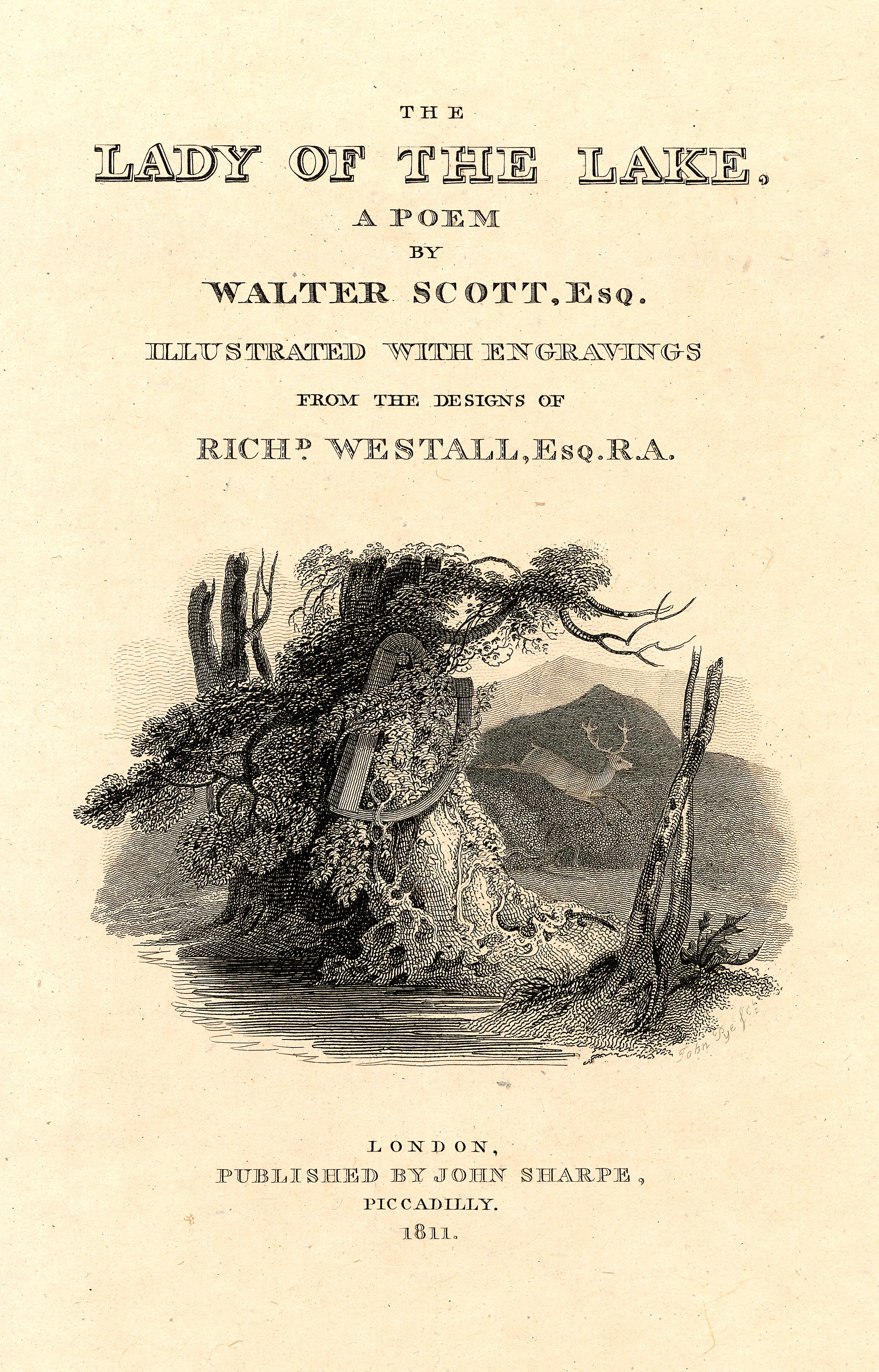
- Title page of 1811 edition with engraving by John Pye based on Richard Westall's design
- Written: 1809–1810
- Country: Scotland
- Form: Narrative
- Meter: Iambic tetrameter
- Publisher: John Ballantyne and Co., Edinburgh; Longman, Hurst, Rees, Orme, Brown, and W. Miller, London
- Publication date: 8 May 1810
- Preceded by: Marmion
- Followed by: The Vision of Don Roderick

Full text
- The Lady of the Lake at Wikisource

The Lady of the Lake is a narrative poem by Walter Scott, first published in 1810. Set in the Trossachs region of Scotland, it is composed of six cantos, each of which concerns the action of a single day. There are voluminous antiquarian notes. The poem has three main plots: the contest among three men, Roderick Dhu, James Fitz-James, and Malcolm Graeme, to win the love of Ellen Douglas; the feud and reconciliation of King James V of Scotland and James Douglas; and a war between the Lowland Scots (led by James V) and the Highland clans (led by Roderick Dhu of Clan Alpine). The poem was tremendously influential in the nineteenth century, and inspired the Highland Revival.

== Background ==
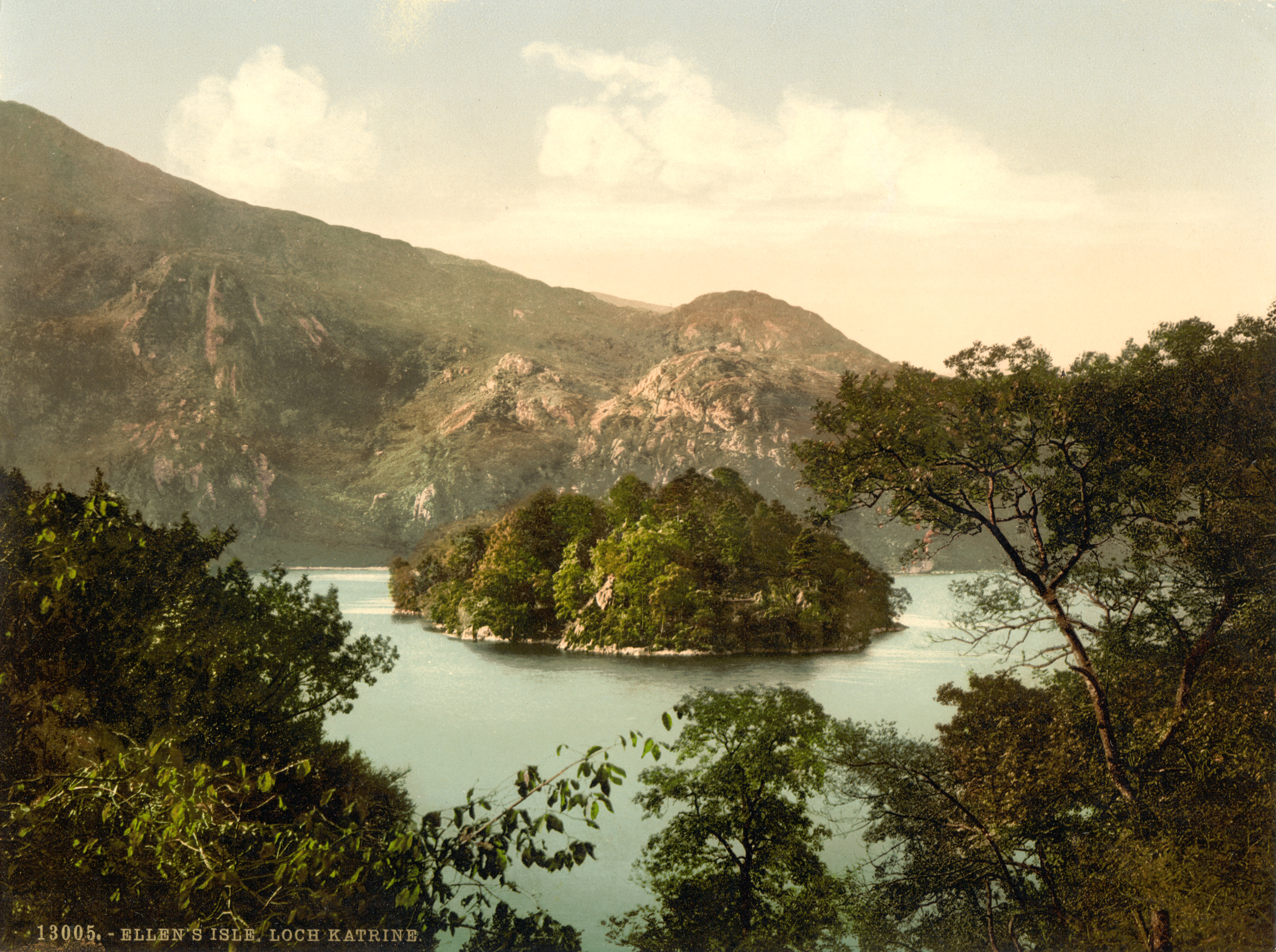
Ellen's Isle (Gaelic: Eilean Molach, 'shaggy island') on Loch Katrine was a stronghold of Clan McGregor.

The first hint of The Lady of the Lake occurs in a letter from Scott to Lady Abercorn dated 9 June 1806, in which he says he has "a grand work in contemplation … a Highland romance of Love Magic and War founded upon the manners of our mountaineers". He saw it as doing for the Highlands what The Lay of the Last Minstrel had done for the Borders.

But in January 1807 he had decided to postpone the Highland work in favour of Marmion since "it would require a journey of some length into the country not only to refresh my faded or inaccurate recollection of the scenery; But also to pick up some of the traditions still floating in the memory of the inhabitants". The poem was eventually begun during a visit to the southern Highlands at the end of August and beginning of September 1809, but in the early stages it seems not to have been composed in a straightforward manner, Scott writing to his Highland correspondent Mrs Clephane on 27 October of the same year: 'I have been amusing myself with trying to scratch out a Douglas tale but this is only for your own ear and family as I have not formed any serious intention of combining or systematizing the parts I have written'. But the poem now had its name, The Lady of the Lake.

Scott announced good progress in November and December. There was some interruption from legal business, but the first two cantos were in print by 14 March, and the next two by 14 April with the fifth in the press and the sixth within sight of completion.

== Editions ==
The first edition of The Lady of the Lake was published on 8 May 1810 in Edinburgh by John Ballantyne and Co. and in London on 16 May by Longman, Hurst, Rees, and Orme, and William Miller. The price was two guineas (£2 2s or £2.10), and 2000 copies were printed. Several more editions followed in the same year, and on 20 February Scott informed John Leyden that 'no less than 25,000 copies have disappeared in eight months and the demand is so far from being abated, that another edition of 3,000 is now at press'.

A critical edition of The Lady of the Lake is due to appear as Volume 3 of The Edinburgh Edition of Walter Scott's Poetry.

== Characters ==
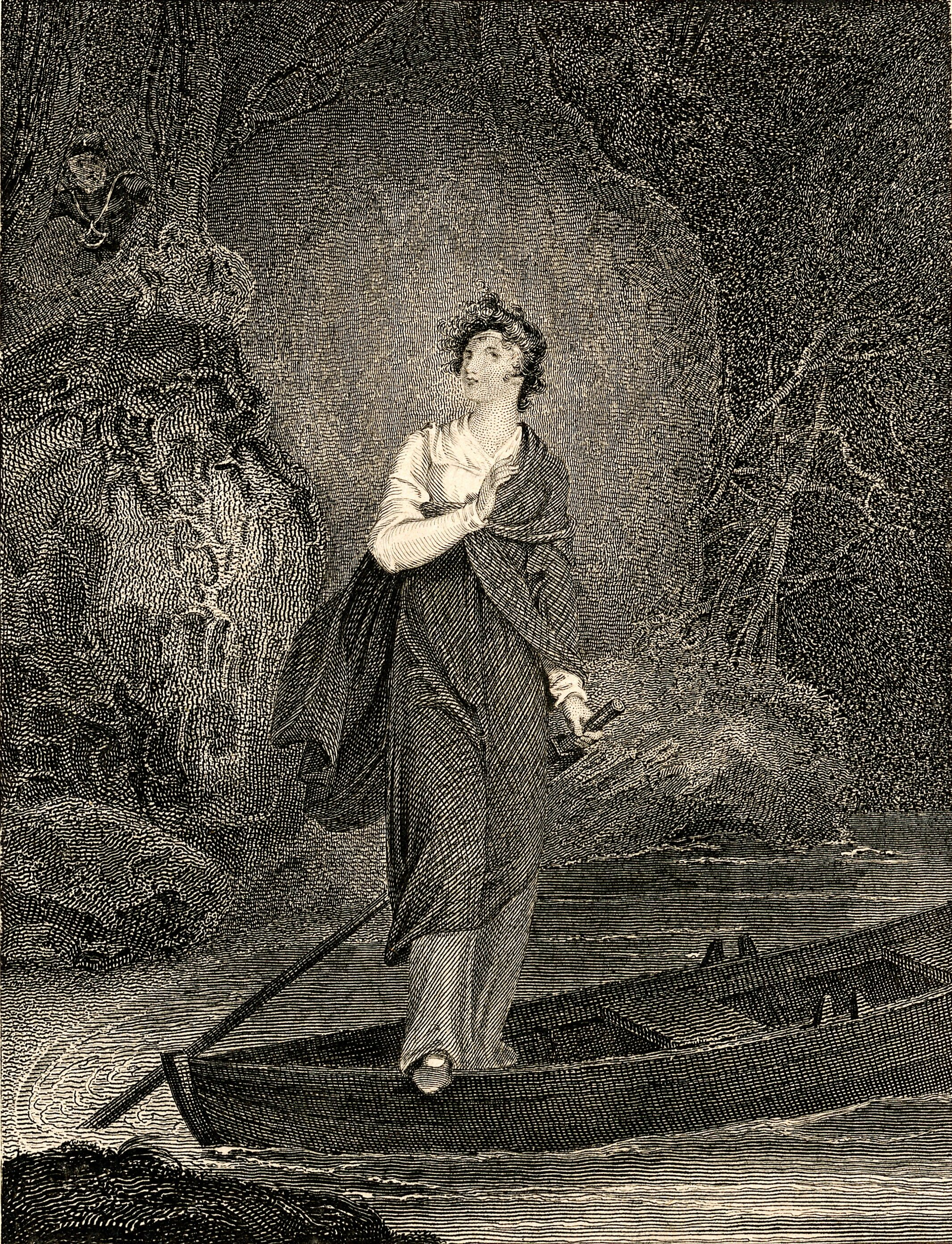
Ellen Douglas – Lady of the Lake. 'In listening mood, she seemed to stand, / The guardian Naiad of the strand.' (Canto I, stanza 17)

- James V of Scotland travelling incognito as James Fitz-James, the Knight of Snowdoun
- Ellen Douglas, daughter of James Douglas
- James Douglas, once the Earl of Morton, the mentor of the youthful King James, now exiled as an enemy
- Allan-Bane, a bard
- Roderick Dhu, the chief of Clan Alpine, outlawed after committing a cold-blooded homicide at the Scottish court
- Lady Margaret, the mother of Roderick Dhu
- Malcolm Graeme, a young highland chief and former courtier of King James, loved by Ellen
- Brian the Hermit, a pagan prophet in the druid tradition
- Duncan, a leading member of Clan Alpine who has just died
- Angus, the son of Duncan
- Norman, a bridegroom and member of Clan Alpine
- Mary, Norman's bride
- Blanche of Devan, a lowland Scottish woman, whose bridegroom was murdered on her wedding day by the men of Clan Alpine, causing Blanche to lose her reason

== Narrative ==
=== Canto I: The Chase ===
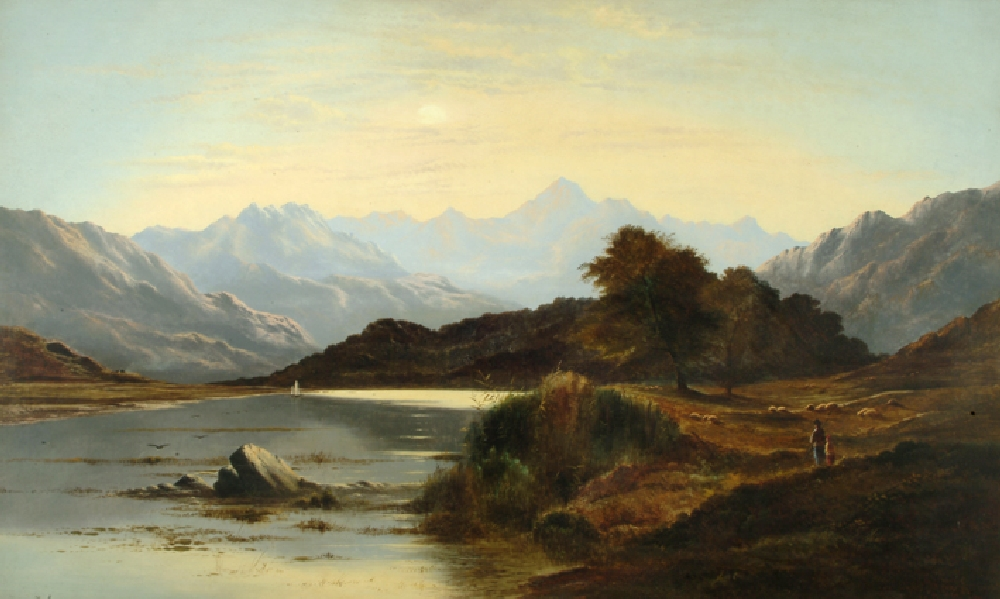
1879 painting of Ellen's Isle

The poem begins with a rapid-moving hunt, chasing a stag in the forests of the Trossachs. The stag outruns the hunt, exhausting all its members until only one huntsman – who, we later learn, is James Fitz-James – follows it until his horse falls down dead of exhaustion.

The huntsman blows his horn to try to contact someone, and wanders to the shore of Loch Katrine where a young woman, Ellen Douglas, rows across and picks him up in a skiff. He is then taken to a lodge, which he suspects is a concealed hide-out of a highland chief. There he is given dinner by Ellen, the bard Allan-Bane, and Lady Margaret, and a bed for the night.

That night he dreams of Ellen, only to see her face suddenly change to that of his exiled enemy, James Douglas – leading him to suspect that Ellen and Douglas are related.

=== Canto II: The Island ===
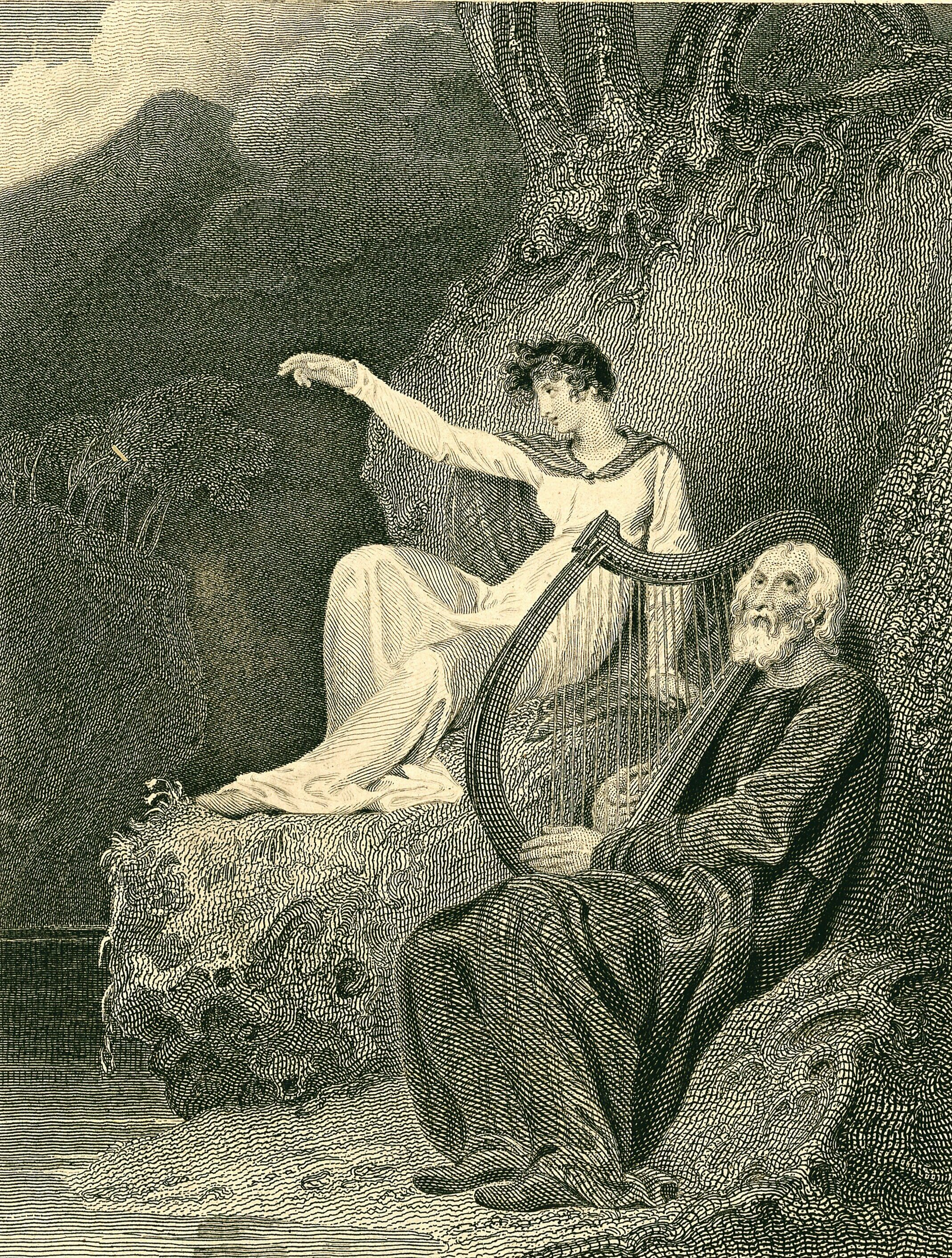
'But when he turned him to the glade, / One courteous parting sign she made.' (Canto II, stanza 6)

Fitz-James leaves the island first thing in the morning. Ellen and Allan Bane discuss Roderick Dhu, Malcolm Graeme, and Fitz-James, agreeing that the first is bloodthirsty and homicidal, but the only person who would defend Douglas, and that Fitz-James is an attractive person, but may be a secret foe of their kinsfolk.

Oarsmen of Clan Alpine escort Roderick Dhu to the island, singing the boat song, 'Hail to the Chief'. Roderick asks Douglas for Ellen's hand in marriage, to conclude an alliance between Douglas and Clan Alpine, which can be the basis of an uprising against King James. Douglas refuses, partly because he will not force Ellen into a loveless marriage, partly also because he remains, despite all the injuries he has suffered, loyal to King James.

Roderick and Malcolm quarrel over Ellen, and are about to draw their swords against each other, but Douglas declares that the first to draw will be his foe. Douglas also says that it is an insult for an exile for his daughter to be the spoil of a battle between two chiefs. Roderick tells Malcolm to leave his territory, which he does, refusing even to borrow a boat, swimming across the loch to the shore.

=== Canto III: The Gathering ===
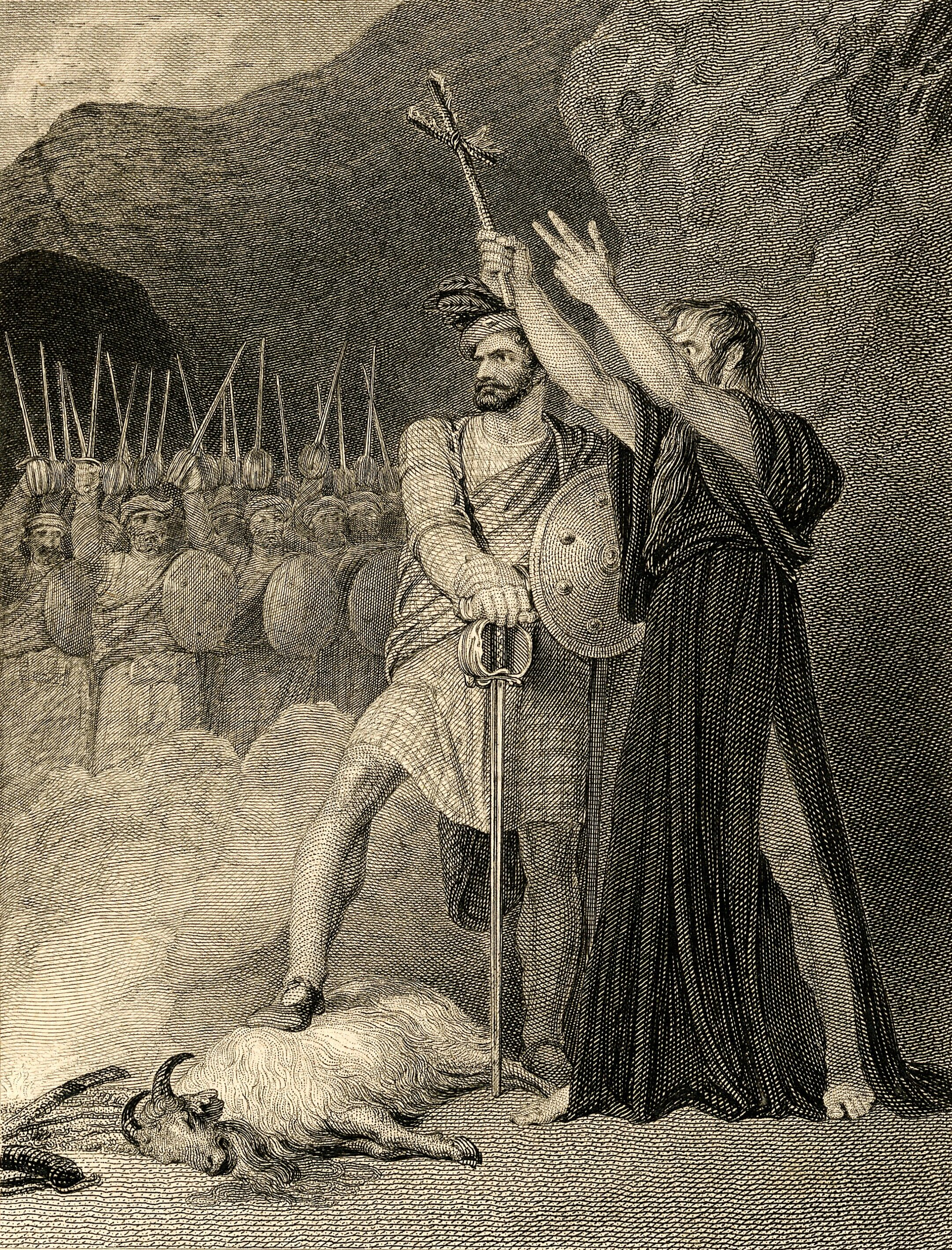
'Woe to the wretch who fails to rear / At this dread sign the ready spear!' (Canto III, stanza 10)

Despite Douglas' refusal to participate in the uprising, Roderick decides to commence the rebellion anyway. With a pagan prophet, Brian the Hermit, he fashions and sets alight the fiery cross, and hands it to his henchman, Malise, to summon the members of the clan to war.

The members of the clan drop everything they are doing to respond to the summons of their chief. Malise runs around the countryside, finally passing the burning cross on to Angus, the son of Duncan, a leading member of the clan who has just died; and Angus, in his turn, passes the summons on to Norman, a bridegroom, interrupting Norman's wedding.

Douglas flees the island for a hermit's cave so that he will not be associated with the Clan Alpine uprising. As Roderick is about to leave the island, he overhears Ellen singing a hymn to the Virgin. He sadly realizes that this is the last time he will ever hear Ellen's voice, and then prepares to go off to battle.

=== Canto IV: The Prophecy ===
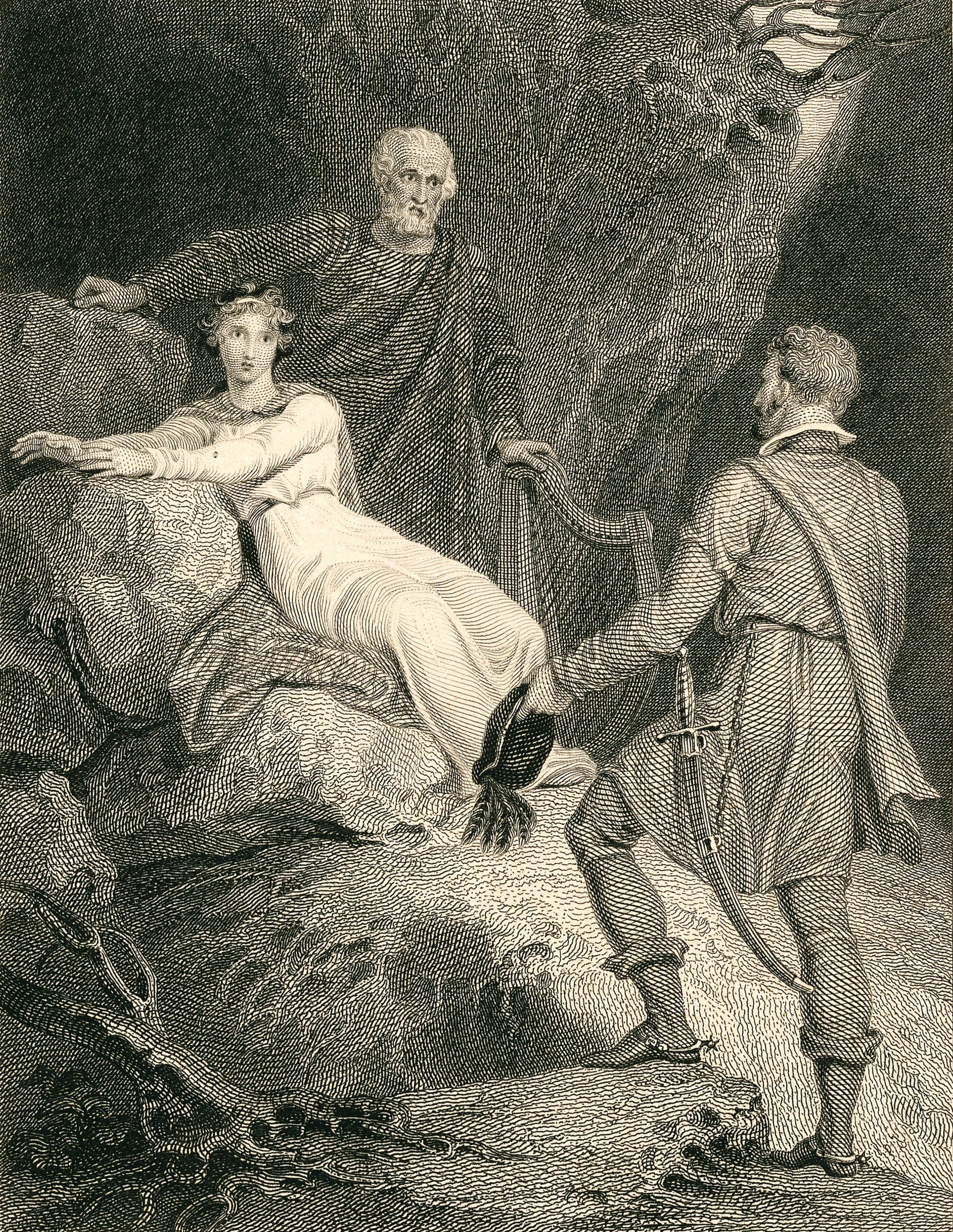
'Ellen beheld as in a dream, / Then, starting, scarce suppressed a scream.' (Canto IV, stanza 16)

Malise and Norman discuss the upcoming battle. Roderick has decided that the women and old men should take shelter on the island in the middle of Loch Katrine. When Norman asks why Roderick is staying apart from the main body of the troops, Malise says it is the result of a prophecy made by Brian. Roderick Dhu had consulted Brian as to what will be the outcome of the battle. To determine this, they sacrificed one of the finest animals that the clan had received from one of its cattle raids, a milk-white bull. Brian prophesied that: 'Which spills the foremost foeman's life, / That party conquers in the strife' (stanza 6; lines 2524–25).

Roderick asks if any of the local friendly clans will fight on Clan Alpine's side; when he hears that none will, he sheds a tear, but at once masters himself and says that Clan Alpine will fight in Trossachs glen. Ellen, meanwhile, is worrying about the fate of her father, who stated that they would meet in heaven next if they met nowhere else. Allan-Bane seeks to distract her by singing the ballad of Alice Brand.

When the ballad ends, Fitz-James appears. He has asked a guide, Murdoch, to bring him back to Loch Katrine. There he pleads with Ellen to leave the Highlands and elope with him. Ellen says she cannot marry him; first, she is the daughter of an outlaw; second, her heart is promised to another. Fitz-James is disappointed, but before he leaves he gives her a ring, saying that if she needs anything from the King of Scotland, she has but to present the ring and it will bring her to him and he will grant her wish.

Murdoch guides Fitz-James further, when they encounter Blanche of Devan. Blanche's bridegroom was slain by Clan Alpine on her wedding day, whereupon she lost her reason. Blanche sings a song of hunting, to warn Fitz-James that Murdoch and the other Clan Alpine men plan to trap and murder him. Fitz-James then draws his sword; Murdoch shoots off an arrow, which misses Fitz-James, but hits Blanche, fatally wounding her. Fitz-James pursues Murdoch and stabs him to death. He returns to Blanche, who warns him of the ambush. Blanche has been wearing a lock of her bridegroom's hair ever since his murder. Blanche dies. Fitz-James cuts off a lock of Blanche's hair, mingles it amidst the hair of her bridegroom, and imbrues it in her blood, promising to steep the lock in the blood of Roderick.

Fitz-James then plans to make his way out of the trap in the Highlands by walking out by night. He succeeds in doing this until he turns a rock and suddenly comes upon a mountaineer sitting by a fire. The warrior challenges him, and Fitz-James says he is not a friend to Roderick. However, the two men recognize each other as worthy warriors, and the mountaineer promises Fitz-James safe passage to Coilantogle ford. The two share a meal and go to sleep side by side.

=== Canto V: The Combat ===
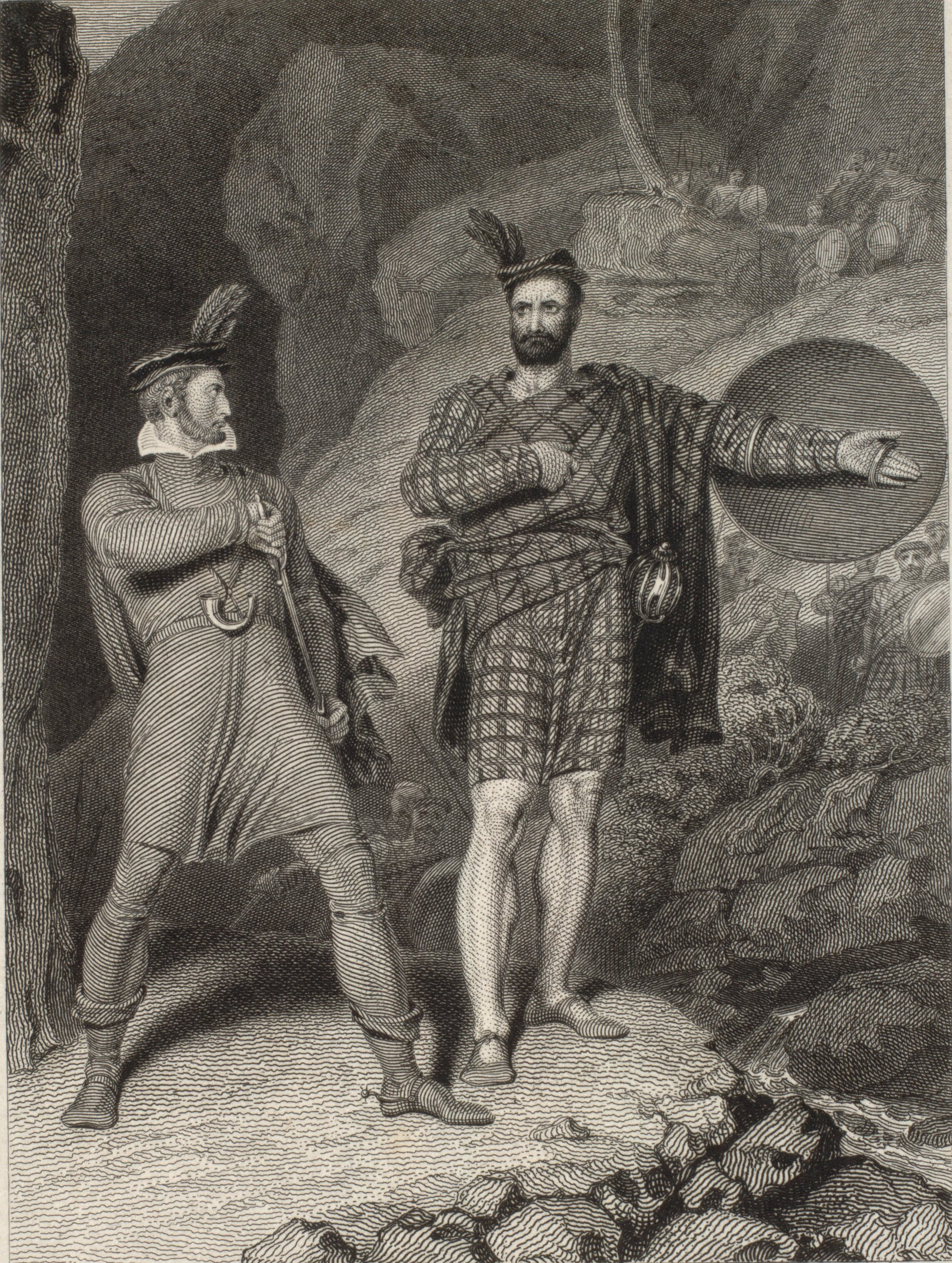
'These are Clan-Alpine's warriors true; / And, Saxon, – I am Roderick Dhu!' (Canto V, stanza 9)

Dawn breaks, and the two men set out. They begin to argue about the relations between Highlanders and Lowlanders; Fitz-James condemns the clans' thefts and feuds, while his guide responds by referring to the many appropriations and legalized crimes of the Lowlanders. Finally, Fitz-James declares that if he ever encounters the chieftain he will revenge himself in full. On this, the mountaineer whistles, and five hundred men stand up from their hiding places; the mountaineer reveals that he is Roderick. Wishing to have this combat all to himself, he dismisses the men who were waiting to ambush.

On arriving at the ford, they begin to fight, the chieftain scorning to settle their differences any other way. Though Roderick is stronger, he is less skillful, and is badly wounded; when Fitz-James stops to address him, the chieftain defiantly seizes him by the throat; but he has lost too much blood, and his strength fails him. Fitz-James wins after a long struggle, and with his bugle summons medical aid for Roderick before setting off for Stirling, where a festival is taking place.

As he approaches the castle, he sees Douglas in the distance. Douglas has come to surrender himself in order to save Roderick and Malcolm; but before doing so, he stops to participate in the games of the festival. He wins so many events that he is brought to meet the king, but the king, giving him the purse of prize-money, will not acknowledge him as an acquaintance. Provoked, Douglas names himself, and is immediately seized.

A messenger rushes up to announce that the Earl of Mar is about to begin battle against Roderick Dhu, and he is ordered to return with the news that both Roderick and Douglas have been captured and that no battle is needed.

=== Canto VI: The Guard-Room ===
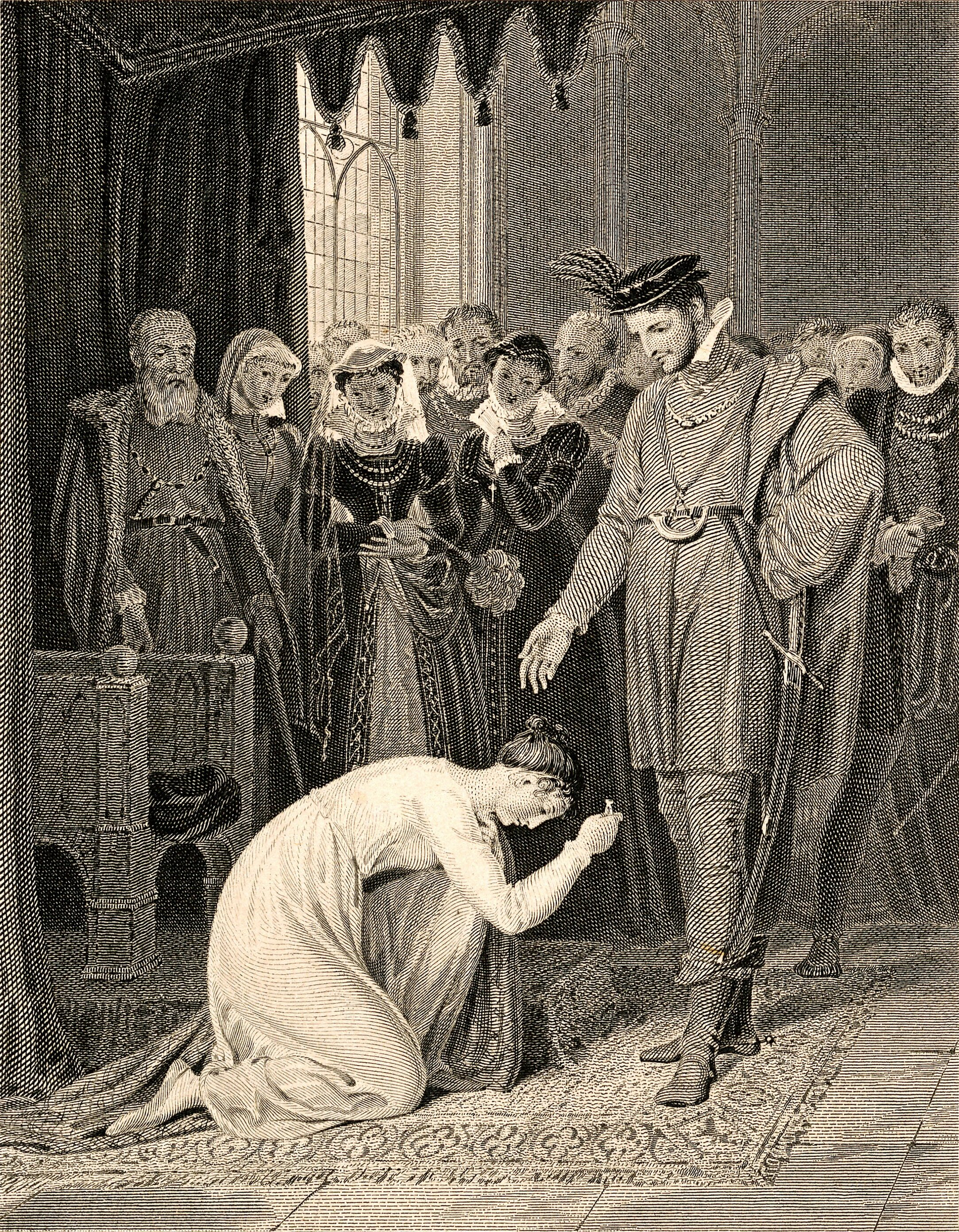
'No word her choaking voice commands, – / She showed the ring, – she clasped her hands.' (Canto VI, stanza 27)

The next morning, Ellen and Allan-Bane enter the guard-room at Stirling Castle, hoping to visit Douglas in prison. Ellen is taken to a furnished room upstairs to wait; Allan-Bane is shown to the cell of the gravely injured Roderick, who dies as Allan sings of the recent battle between Roderick's men and the royalist forces. Meanwhile, leaning out of the window, Ellen is startled and heartbroken to hear the voice of Malcolm, singing in one of the turrets. Soon afterwards Fitz-James arrives to tell her that it is time for her audience with the king.

Ellen enters the room and looks around for King James. To her surprise, every man has doffed his hat except for Fitz-James, and she realises that Fitz-James is the king himself.

Terrified, Ellen collapses, but the king lifts her up and reassures her that her father has been pardoned, and asks whom else she would like released. Her generous first thought is of Roderick, but James tells her that he has died. Ellen is about to ask for Malcolm, but cannot speak; divining her wish, the king jokingly orders that Malcolm be put in fetters, and after putting a gold chain around the man's neck, gives the clasp to Ellen.

== Sources ==
The poem is not based upon specific historic events, but has certain elements that occurred in Scottish history:

- In legend, King James V of Scotland was reputed to travel anonymously among his subjects.
- Several kings of Scotland quarrelled with Clan Douglas.
- Clan Alpine is a very old Highland clan in re-establishment, whom many clans claim descendant from, e.g. the MacGregors. They represent the Highland people and their power-struggle with the Scots monarchy.

== Reception ==
The Lady of the Lake in general received a very positive critical reception, some considering it Scott's best poem to date. Several reviewers considered that defects perceived in Marmion had been eliminated, George Ellis speaking for many when he wrote in The Quarterly Review: 'The plot is not laid in the marvellous concurrence of improbable accidents; it is not obscurely and laboriously unravelled; there is no petty intricacy or entanglement; the principal actors are not contaminated by such vices as destroy our interest in their fate; there is no inattention to Scotish feelings or Scotish character; no allusions to English black letter books; and not one word about servants' liveries'. The smoothness of the style was appreciated, but there were doubts about the number of songs introduced, and their variable quality.

== Influences ==
The Lady of the Lake continued to be a standard reading in elementary schools until the early twentieth century. Its influences are both extensive and diverse, given that both the last name taken by the leading African-American abolitionist, Frederick Douglass, and the Ku Klux Klan custom of cross burning derive from the influence of the poem (through the film The Birth of a Nation.) But, the Fiery cross or Crann Tara was a device for rallying people in Scotland and did not carry racist connotations.

=== Rossini's La Donna del Lago ===
Gioachino Rossini composed an opera, La Donna del Lago, based on the poem. The opera downplays the other plots in favor of the love story. In the opera, James Douglas tells Ellen that she must marry Roderick Dhu. Some of the characters' names are changed slightly: Roderick Dhu becomes Rodrigo, Ellen becomes Elena, and James Fitz-James becomes Uberto.

=== Schubert's Sieben Gesänge aus Walter Scotts "Fräulein am See" ===
Walter Scott's poem, in the German translation by Adam Storck, was set to music by Franz Schubert in his work entitled Sieben Gesänge aus Walter Scotts "Fräulein am See" (Seven songs from Walter Scott's Lady of the Lake). This includes the three "Ellen songs": "Ellens Gesang I", "Ellens Gesang II", and "Ellens Gesang III." Owing to its opening words, "Ave Maria", Ellens Gesang III is sometimes also referred to as "Schubert's Ave Maria". However, the music has become more famous in a later adaptation that replaced the Scott/Storck text with the Latin text of the Catholic "Ave Maria" ("Hail Mary") prayer.

Other songs from the poem set by Schubert are "The Boat-Song" beginning with the famous lines "Hail to the Chief", a mourning song sung for Duncan, "Coronach", "Normans Gesang", sung by Norman to Mary when he learns that he must join the Clan-Alpine muster, and finally "Lied des gefangenen Jägers" (Song of the imprisoned huntsman), sung by Malcolm Graeme, the betrothed of Ellen Douglas, while captive in Stirling Castle. "Boot Gesang" and "Coronach" are choral pieces, and as the other songs in the cycle are for solo voice, complete performances of the cycle are thus very rare.

=== Frederick Douglass ===
Frederick Douglass took his last name from the poem. When Douglass escaped from slavery, he changed his last name to Johnson to hide from his former master. A friend, Nathan Johnson of New Bedford, Massachusetts, proposed a new one:

I gave Mr. Johnson the privilege of choosing me a name, but told him he must not take from me the name of "Frederick." I must hold on to that, to preserve a sense of my identity. Mr. Johnson had just been reading the Lady of the Lake, and at once suggested that my name be "Douglass."

=== Ellen Douglas Birdseye Wheaton ===
Ellen Douglas Birdseye Wheaton (1816–1858), author of The Diary of Ellen Birdseye Wheaton (1923, privately printed, Boston), wife of the abolitionist Charles Augustus Wheaton (1809–1882), was named for the Scott heroine by her parents.

=== Cross burning ===
In the third canto of the poem, a burnt cross is used to summon Clan Alpine to rise against King James. This method of rallying supporters and publicizing their attacks was adapted by the second Ku Klux Klan in 1915 after the film, The Birth of a Nation.

Walter Scott notes when seeking assistance from neighboring villages, Scottish highland chieftains killed a goat, made a cross of light wood, lit the four ends on fire, and extinguished the flames with the sacrifice of the goat's blood. The cross was carried to the first village by a messenger who spoke one word; the place to meet. The village would send a messenger with the cross to the next village and relay the same message.

Any man between the ages of 16 and 60 able to bear arms who failed to arrive at the appointed tryst in full battle gear met the same fate as the goat and cross – himself slain and his chattels burnt.

=== Classics Illustrated edition ===
In September 1950, the comic-book publisher, Gilberton Company, Inc., of New York City, issued Classics Illustrated number 75, "The Lady of the Lake". It was illustrated by Henry C. Kiefer, one of Gilberton's best graphic artists for the comic-book genre. The editor was Helene Lecar, who transformed the cantos into a concise narrative that would be interesting to school-age children. It has 44 pages devoted to the story by Sir Walter Scott, plus one page of biography of Sir Walter. Classics Illustrated number 75 originally sold for 10 cents, and tens of thousands of copies were printed on cheap newsprint. It remains a collector's item more than six decades later, and is widely sold in used comic-book stores.

=== Dramatisations ===
Henry Siddons' produced Edmund John Eyre's adaptation of the poem for the stage at the Theatre Royal, Edinburgh, in 1811 and the Theatre Royal, Dundee, in 1812. A lavish production of the drama was staged at the Lyceum Theatre, Edinburgh, in 1887, with spectacular scenery depicting scenes in the Trossachs, James Howard playing Roderick Dhu and Fred Wyndham in the role of Marmaduke.

Andrew Halliday's adaptation of the poem was produced at the Theatre Royal, Drury Lane, London, in 1872.

=== Film adaptation ===
In 1928 the poem served as the basis for a silent film The Lady of the Lake directed by James A. FitzPatrick and starring Percy Marmont and Benita Hume. It was made at Islington Studios by Gainsborough Pictures.
