= Mary Hodgson =

English soprano (1673–1719)

- Born: baptised 1673
- Died: 1719?
- Occupation: singer
- Spouse: John Hodgson

Mary Hodgson (baptised December 26, 1673 – 1719?) was an English soprano.

== Life ==
She was baptised on Boxing Day in 1673. Her mother is not known but her father is thought to be the dancing teacher Benjamin Dyer. She was known as Mrs Dyer when she first appeared on stage in the premier of Purcell’s semi-opera The Fairy-Queen at London's Dorset Garden Theatre. After two weeks she married a fellow actor named John Hodgson at St Dunstan's, Stepney and this confused the press as some reported her as Mrs Dyer and others as Mary Hudson.

She was a member of the United Theatre Company and she was appearing in plays. In 1693 Henry Purcell's Diocletian was revived and Hodgson was one of the singers.

In 1695 some top actors started a new group and they had Thomas Betterton as their leader at the Lincoln's Inn Fields Theatre. They had left the United Theatre Company.

In 1697 she first sang at court for a Royal birthday and during the first part of the 18th century she was frequently singing at Yorks Buildings. In 1701 an English Opera, The Judgment of Paris with a libretto by William Congreve was staged. Different composers supplied the music, and the audience declared a winner. Hodgson's performance in the role of Juno singing to John Eccles' music was praised by Congreve. In 1704 she sang songs in "The Biter" as Nicholas Rowe turned his hand to comedy for a debut at the Lincoln's Inn Theatre. She sang again for Royal birthdays that year and again in 1706. In that year her company moved to Queen's Theatre. She received a benefit performance in 1710 and 1718. Mary Hodgson had her last benefit in 1719 and that is thought to be the year of her death. A Mary Hudson of Holborn was buried there.
