= Ulysses (play) =

- Original language: English
- Written by: Nicholas Rowe
- Genre: Tragedy

Premiere
- Date: 23 November 1705
- Place: Queen's Theatre

Ulysses is a 1705 tragedy by the British writer Nicholas Rowe. Rowe turned back to writing tragedies following his unsuccessful comedy The Biter of the previous year. The cast included Thomas Betterton as Ulysses, Barton Booth as Telemachus, Elizabeth Barry as Penelope and Anne Bracegirdle as Semanthe. Many of the actors also appeared in Rowe's following work The Royal Convert.

It is set during the reign of Ulysses. Focusing on a succession dispute at the Greek court, the Whig Rowe shows his support for both the proposed Act of Union between England and Scotland and the coming Hanoverian Succession in preference to the Jacobite claimants.

SUMMARY

The play begins at the time of Ulysses' return to Ithaca; for the preceding twenty years, he has been away from Ithaca and his Queen, Penelope. In his absence a mob of aspiring consorts to Penelope have gradually taken over the Ithacan Court. These rival suitors, increasingly emboldened by Ulysses' absence, cause riot and tumult in the Court and threaten the sovereignty of Ithaca. Chief among the suitors are Eurymachus, King of Samos and Antinous, an Ithacan nobleman and false friend of Penelope and Ulysses' son, Telemachus.

Telemachus, meanwhile, is in love with the daughter of the Samian king, Semanthe, who ardently loves him in return, notwithstanding a foreboding dream she has in which Telemachus is replaced with the dead body of her father. Eurymachus attempts to win the Queen's affections, but when he realizes that she isn't to be swayed by routine appeals to love and tenderness, threatens to have his soldiers kill her son, Telemachus. She relents and promises herself to him later that night, not without a great deal of anguish and self-mortification; she even goes so far as to attempt to stab herself, but Aethon (who appears to her to be an agent of Eurymachus, but who is actually Ulysses in disguise) prevents her from accomplishing the deed. By contrast, in the Homeric epic, Ulysses is disguised as a beggar.

Shortly afterwards, Ulysses reveals himself to her, and then to Telemachus, who knows him only as Aethon. Once introduced, Ulysses concocts a plan to descend upon and kill the rival suitors -- "send their guilty Souls to howl below"—and asks that Telemachus meanwhile stand guard in Penelope's chambers and slay anyone who dares pass into it. Act three, in which these introductions and plotting take place, closes with a powerful, albeit short speech by Ulysses in which he proclaims his confidence in his scheme. Eventually, Eurymachus comes to the Queen’s chambers, to consummate his desires, but Telemachus is there, guarding his mother. Eurymachus insists that he be permitted to enter, Telemachus refuses, the two draw swords, and Eurymachus is killed. Shortly after this, Telemachus runs for help and in that time away Semanthe arrives and sees her dying father on the floor; Eurymachus tells Semanthe that Telemachus was the one who has mortally wounded him, and, upon his return to the chambers, the two lovers exchange anguished words and part ways.

Antinous arrives with help and manages to kidnap the Queen from her chamber and announces plans to turn the town against Ulysses (or possibly discredit his identity as Ulysses). He appears to be gaining success in turning the Ithacans against Ulysses, as well as Mentor, Telemachus, and the small band of faithful, original followers of Ulysses. Meanwhile, the body of Eurymachus is taken into the street; Semanthe is proclaimed Queen of the Samians and the soldiers vow to follow her command.

In the closing scenes of the play, Antinous and the Ithacan army (and mob) confront Ulysses and his diminished band of followers. On the verge of victory, Arcas arrives to announce that Telemachus has been fighting the supporters of Antinous because they were told by Semanthe that it was Antinous who killed the Samian king, Eurymachus. Invigorated by the support of the Samian army, Ulysses and his men fight the shocked and unsteady Ithacans, led by Antinous, and defeat him. The play closes with a speech by Ulysses on the inevitability of pain in the life of a man, illustrated best by his twenty year voyage preceding the start of the play.

== Bibliography ==
- Burling, William J. A Checklist of New Plays and Entertainments on the London Stage, 1700-1737. Fairleigh Dickinson Univ Press, 1992.
- Caines, Michael in The Plays and Poems of Nicholas Rowe, Volume I: The Early Plays. Taylor & Francis, 2016.
