= Thomas Miller (bookseller) =

English bookseller (1731–1804)

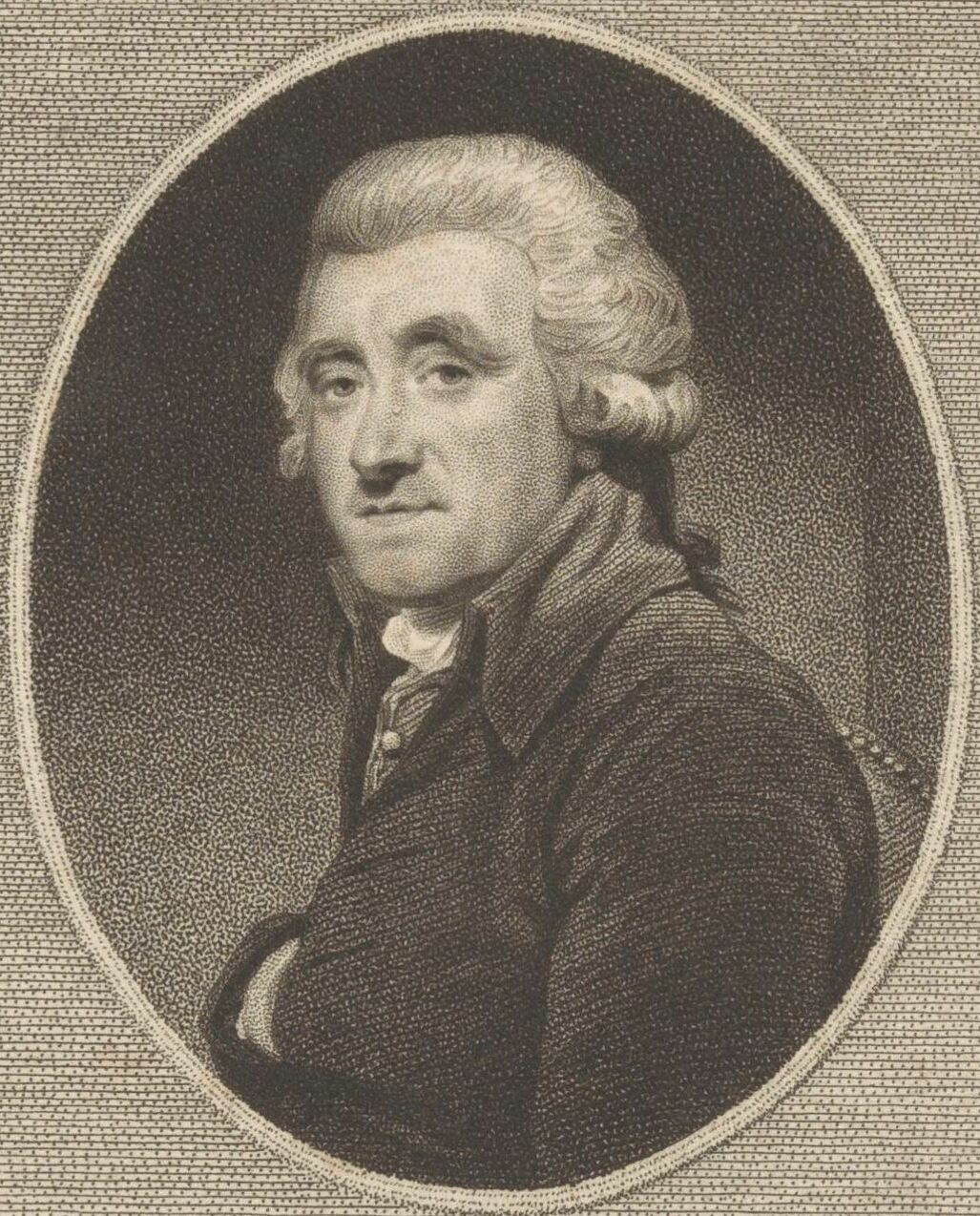
Thomas Miller

Thomas Miller (14 August 1731 – 25 July 1804) was a leading English bookseller.

== Origins and early life ==
Miller was born in Norwich on 14 August 1731, the son of Thomas Miller, a pavior. He was apprenticed to a grocer, but when he commenced business for himself in 1755 his fondness for reading induced him to combine bookselling with his other trade.

== Bookseller and antiquary ==
Miller later settled in Bungay, Suffolk, where the demand for books was small. Moreover, his sturdy independence lost him to the custom of many of the local magnates. As his son William recorded in a memoir:

Thomas Miller was little suited by nature to the quiet, unambitious life of a country shopkeeper. He possessed a strong & vigorous understanding, with great energy & industry. His mind, which he had improved by much reading, was adapted to a larger sphere - his cramped locality marred his fortune...He had a spirit too independent for the petty aristocracy that surrounds most country towns - his politics never varied or were adapted to his local interests....He had a talent for light poetry but was too fond of lampooning his neighbours when the vein was upon him & he saw a fair opportunity.

Miller's stock of books was very valuable, and he had an extensive collection of engraved portraits, and nearly a complete series of Roman and English silver and brass coins. He published catalogues of his collections in 1782 and 1790. In 1795, when the fashion was very general for tradesmen to circulate provincial halfpennies, he had a die-cast, but an accident happened to one of the blocks when only twenty-three pieces had been struck off, Miller declined having a fresh one made. This coin, finely engraved, with a strong profile likeness of Miller, is known to collectors by the name of the "Miller halfpenny".

== Family, death and posterity ==
On 12 July 1756, Miller married Ann Scarlett at Swaffham (daughter of Edward Scarlett); they had no children, and she died in 1763. In 1764 he married Sarah (Sally), the daughter of William Kingsbury, a maltster. Their son, William Richard Beckford Miller (1769–1844), became a leading publisher. They also had three daughters.

In 1799 Miller became quite blind, but continued in business until his death, at Bungay on 25 July 1804. Miller's portrait was engraved by E. Scriven from a miniature by Henry Edridge.
