= A Poem Upon the Late Glorious Successes =

1707 poem by Nicholas Rowe

- by Nicholas Rowe
- Language: English

A Poem Upon the Late Glorious Successes of Her Majesty's Arms is a 1707 pamphlet poem by the British writer Nicholas Rowe, later poet laureate. It was composed as a panegyric to commemorate the campaigns of the British general the Duke of Marlborough during the War of the Spanish Succession. It was one of a group of celebratory works that came in the wake of Marlborough's victory at the Battle of Ramillies. Rowe's fellow writer Joseph Addison had produced The Campaign in similar style.

It was inscribed to Lord Godolphin, at time Lord Treasurer and head of government. It has been described as "Rowe's first major statement as a poet" and was part of the developing Whig tradition in writing, that broke with the earlier Toryism of John Dryden. It was published by Jacob Tonson, known for his association with Whig writers through the Kit Cat Club.

The same year Rowe also produced another political work Unio to celebrate the recent Act of Union that created the Kingdom of Great Britain.

== See also ==
- The Battles of Talavera, an 1809 work in similar style commemorating the Battle of Talavera

== Bibliography ==
- Stephen Bernard & Robin Sowerby. The Plays and Poems of Nicholas Rowe, Volume IV: Poems and Lucan’s Pharsalia (Books I-III). Taylor & Francis, 2016.
- Alan Houston & Steve Pincus. A Nation Transformed: England After the Restoration. Cambridge University Press, 2001.
- Annibel Jenkins. Nicholas Rowe. Twayne Publishers, 1977.
