= Marmion (poem) =

Poem by Sir Walter Scott

Marmion: A Tale of Flodden Field
- by Sir Walter Scott
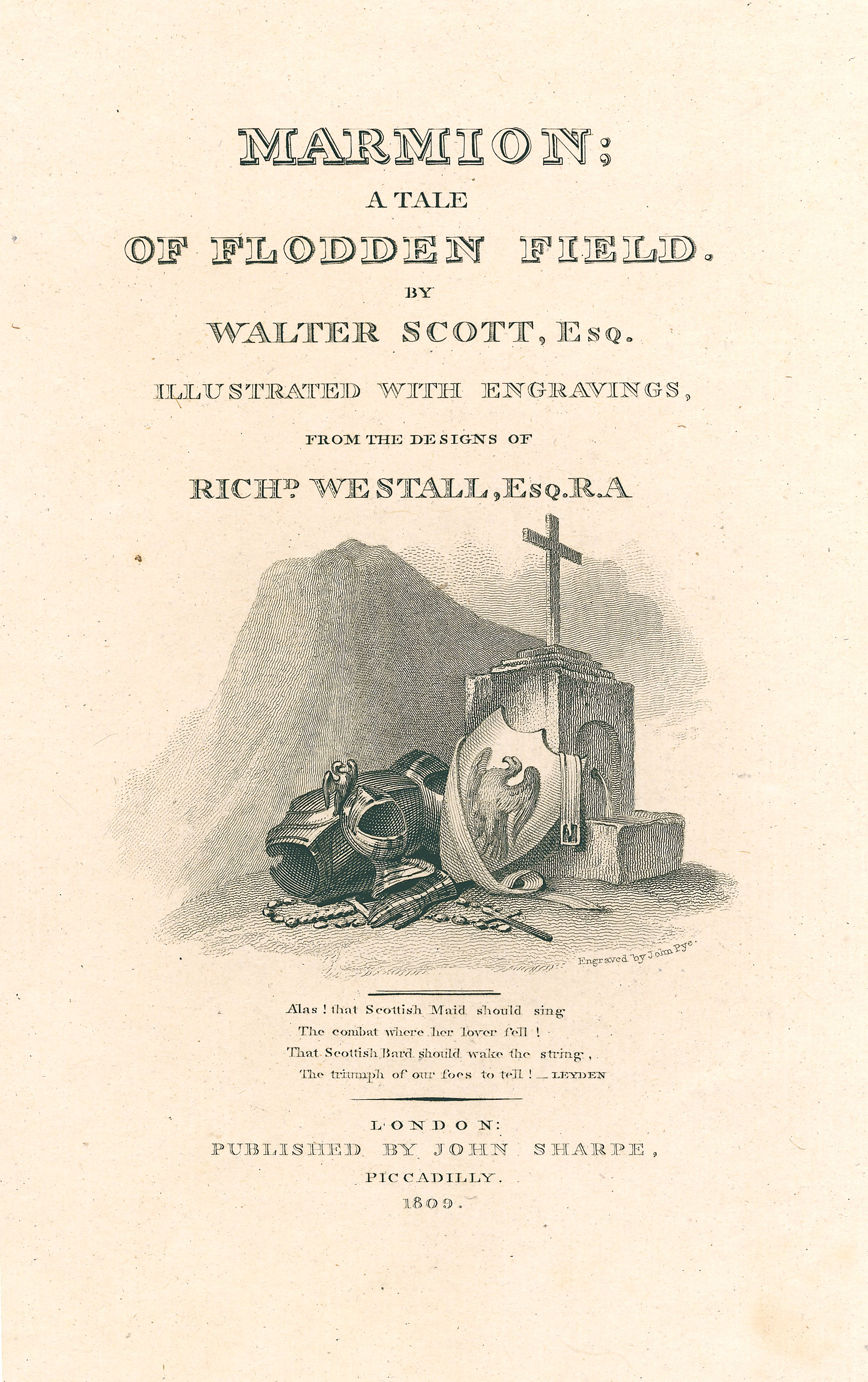
- Title page of 1809 edition
- Written: 1806–1808
- Country: Scotland
- Form: Narrative
- Meter: Iambic tetrameter
- Publisher: Archibald Constable, Edinburgh; William Miller, and John Murray, London
- Publication date: 22 February 1808
- Preceded by: The Lay of the Last Minstrel
- Followed by: The Lady of the Lake

Full text
- Marmion at Wikisource

Marmion: A Tale of Flodden Field is a historical romance in verse set in 16th-century Scotland and England by Sir Walter Scott, published in 1808. Consisting of six cantos, each with an introductory epistle, and copious antiquarian notes, it concludes with the Battle of Flodden in 1513.

== Background ==
The introductory letter to the first canto of Marmion is internally dated November, and there is no reason to doubt that it was written in that month of 1806. At this time Scott was entering into correspondence with the Durham antiquary Robert Surtees, and in December they discussed the account given by Robert Lindsay of Pitscottie of the supernatural summons of James IV and several of his nobles to appear before Pluto, which Scott uses in the fifth canto: Scott refers to his developing poem, so it is clear that the overall shape of the work was clear from the outset. Moreover, Surtees sent Scott two forgeries of his own, an account in Latin of a ghostly combat and a ballad, both of which also appear in the poem.

On 30 January 1807 Archibald Constable concluded an agreement to pay 1,000 guineas (£1,050) for the copyright: the sum may have originated with Scott in previous negotiations with Longman. William Miller and John Murray each agreed to take a 25% share in the project. Murray observed: "We both view it as honourable, profitable, and glorious to be concerned in the publication of a new poem by Walter Scott." Scott said that he thoroughly enjoyed writing the work. He told his son-in-law, Lockhart: "Oh, man, I had many a grand gallop among these braes when I was thinking of Marmion." The poem took much longer to compose than Scott had hoped: he was held up by personal and family difficulties and other occupations, and it was probably January 1808 before it was finished.

== Editions ==
Marmion was published in Edinburgh by Archibald Constable on 22 February 1808, and in London by William Miller and John Murray on 8 March. It cost one and a half guineas (£1 11s 6d), and 2,000 copies were printed. Scott produced small refinements for the text of the verse and larger updatings for the notes in the second edition and third editions (3,000 copies each) published later in the year. Many further editions followed, both individual and collected, and in 1830 Scott provided the poem with a new introduction.

In 2018 Ainsley McIntosh produced a critical edition of Marmion: A Tale of Flodden Field as the second volume (the first to appear) of The Edinburgh Edition of Walter Scott's Poetry, published by Edinburgh University Press. This takes the third edition as its copy-text and corrects it mainly from the manuscript and the first edition.

According to the University of Delaware Arsenical Books Database, the 1855 edition of this book contains arsenic, particularly in the green cover, and ought to be handled with care using nitrile gloves. This book should be stored in a plastic bag to keep arsenic from spreading.

== Plot ==
The poem tells how Lord Marmion, a favourite of Henry VIII of England, lusts after Clara de Clare, a rich woman. He and his mistress, Constance de Beverley, forge a letter implicating Clara's fiancé, Sir Ralph de Wilton, in treason. Constance, a dishonest nun, hopes that her aid will restore her to favour with Marmion. When de Wilton loses the duel he claims in order to defend his honour against Marmion, he is obliged to go into exile. Clara retires to a convent rather than risk Marmion's attentions.

Constance's hopes of a reconciliation with Marmion are dashed when he abandons her; she ends up being walled up alive in the Lindisfarne convent for breaking her vows. She takes her revenge by giving the Abbess, who is one of her three judges, documents that prove de Wilton's innocence. De Wilton, having returned disguised as a pilgrim, follows Marmion to Edinburgh where he meets the Abbess, who gives him the exonerating documents. When Marmion's host, the Earl of Angus (Archibald Douglas), is shown the documents, he arms de Wilton and accepts him as a knight again. De Wilton's plans for revenge are overturned by the Battle of Flodden. Marmion dies on the battlefield, while de Wilton displays heroism, regains his honour, retrieves his lands, and marries Clara.

== Canto summary ==
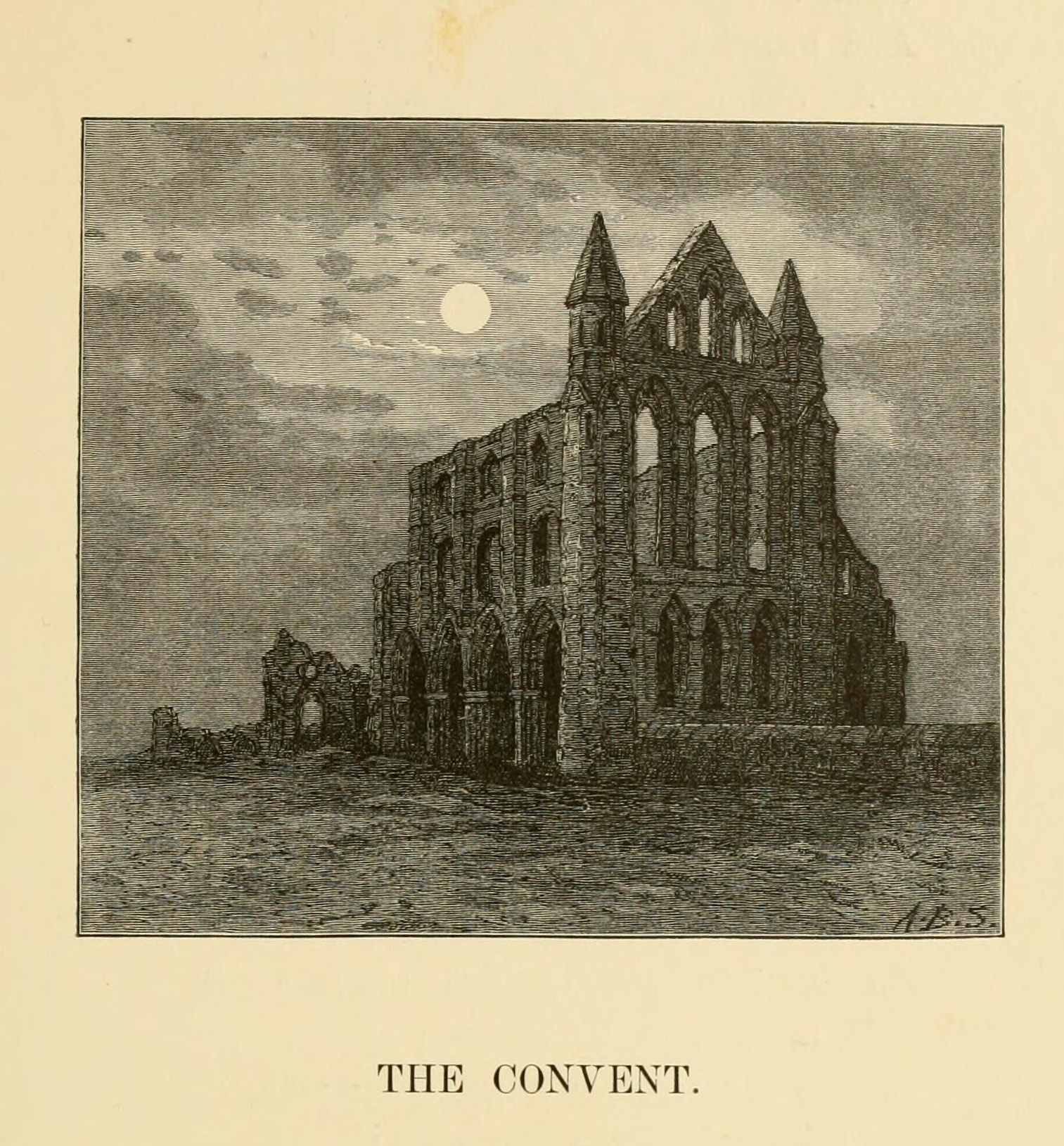
Canto 2 illustration, from an 1885 edition

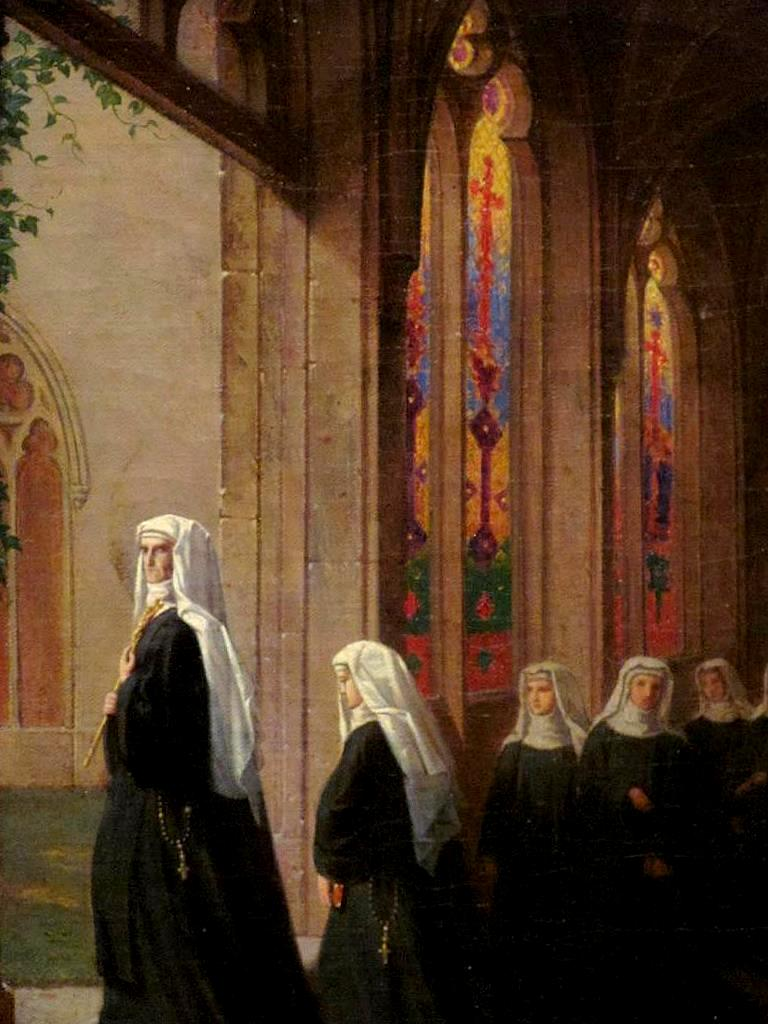
Detail of the painting Lady Clara de Clare, inspired by original poem Marmion (William D. Washington).

Introduction to Canto 1 (To William Stewart Rose, Esq.): Writing in November, Scott considers possible remedies for the destructive effect of time in the natural world, in public affairs (he elegises Nelson, Pitt, and Fox), and in literature: namely spring, the apocalypse, and the revival of medieval romance.

Canto 1 (The Castle): The English knight Marmion and his train are received by Sir Hugh the Heron at Norham Castle who arranges for a palmer to guide him on his embassy from Henry VIII to James IV, King of Scots in Edinburgh.

Introduction to Canto 2 (To the Rev. John Mariot): Scott considers remedies for historical decline and personal loneliness, namely the joy Mariot and he have found in humble enjoyments, and the purity of solitary meditation.

Canto 2 (The Convent): The Abbess of Whitby, with a party of nuns including a novice Sister Clare, journeys by sea to Lindisfarne, where she forms one of a tribunal in sentencing Constance de Beverly to be immured alive together with an accomplice in the planned murder of Clare. In her final speech Constance tells how she had escaped from a convent to join Marmion who had then abandoned her for the wealthy Clare, charging Clare's fiancé with treason and defeating him in armed combat.

Introduction to Canto 3 (To William Erskine): Scott defends his intuitive, ever-varying poetry, taking its inspiration from his experience of the Borders as a young child, against Erskine's advocacy of elevated classical elegy and tragedy.

Canto 3 (The Hostel, or Inn): Staying overnight at the inn at Gifford, Marmion is disconcerted when his squire Fitz-Eustace sings a favourite song of Constant (Constance's name when she had accompanied him disguised as a page), and also by the stern looks of the palmer. The host tells of a local elfin spirit who offers combat to all comers. Fitz-Eustace observes Marmion leave to encounter the spirit and return at speed with tell-tale signs of combat.

Introduction to Canto 4 (To James Skene): Writing again in November, a year having passed since the first introduction, Scott laments the passing of the youthful companionship enjoyed by Skene and himself, but takes comfort from their more mature acceptance of the variety of experience allotted by Heaven.

Canto 4 (The Camp): Sir David Lindsay meets Marmion on the road and arranges for the delegation to receive supervised accommodation at Crichton Castle till James is ready to receive him. Lindsay tells Marmion that a supernatural figure resembling St John has (unavailingly) urged the king against war with England. In response Marmion tells of his supernatural combat at Gifford. Approaching Edinburgh, Marmion surveys from Blackford Hill the assembled Scottish forces as Lindsay deplores the move towards war.

Introduction to Canto 5 (To George Ellis): Writing in December from Edinburgh, Scott asserts that the city is more liberal than in medieval times, but just as secure. Ellis is an example to Scott of how medieval literature can be restored and rendered relevant to the modern world.

Canto 5 (The Court): Passing through the Scottish forces, Marmion is received by James (in thrall to his mistress Lady Heron and the Queen of France) who commits him to the keeping of the pacific Archibald Douglas at Tantallon Castle and asks him to take charge of the group of English nuns from Canto 2 captured by a Scottish galley. The abbess meets the palmer at night and entrusts him with papers deriving from Constance proving Marmion's part in the false accusation of De Wilton which she had abetted in order to gain influence over him. At Tantallon Marmion, who has been entrusted with returning Clare to her kinsman Lord Fitz-Clare, hears with impatience of the build-up towards battle.

Introduction to Canto 6 (To Richard Heber): Writing from Mertoun at Christmas, Scott celebrates the festive occasion maintaining ancient family traditions, and asserts the imaginative power of the superstitions recorded in the old books amassed by the bibliophile Heber.

Canto 6 (The Battle): De Wilton appears to Clara at Tantallon and tells how he disguised himself as the palmer. He is knighted by Douglas. Marmion joins Surrey's forces at Flodden and dies of wounds received in the battle, tended by Clare, who is then united with Lord Fitz-Clare. Marmion's body is confused with that of a peasant and buried in an unmarked grave. Clare and De Wilton marry.

== Reception ==
Many of the reviewers judged Marmion equal in merit to The Lay of the Last Minstrel, though displaying different qualities: one critic for example thought that it 'is less sprightly, and less fanciful, but it is more heroic and more stately' But the tone of the comments tended to be more severe than before: thus, although Francis Jeffrey in The Edinburgh Review carefully balanced virtues and defects, his overall verdict tended to the negative. Several reviewers felt that faults evident in the earlier poem were less tolerable on a second appearance, especially a tendency to antiquarian pedantry. Marmion was also criticised for its style, the obscurity and improbability of the plot, the immorality of its main character, and the lack of connection between the introductory epistles and the narrative.

Marmion was a success with the public and remained popular for over a century. The stanzas telling the story of "young Lochinvar" from Canto 5 particularly caught the public imagination and were widely published in anthologies and learned as a recitation piece. "Lochinvar is a brave knight who arrives unannounced at the bridal feast of Ellen, his beloved, who is about to be married to 'a laggard in love and a dastard in war'. Lochinvar claims one dance with the bride and dances her out the door, swooping her up onto his horse, and they ride off together into the unknown." The Brontë sisters were also admirers of Marmion. It is mentioned in Jane Eyre when St. John Rivers gives the poem to Jane. Similarly, in Anne Brontë's The Tenant of Wildfell Hall (1848), Gilbert Markham, the narrator, gives a copy of Marmion to the central character, Helen Graham. The Irish politician and writer John Wilson Croker took it as the inspiration for his own 1809 work The Battles of Talavera.

One of the most quoted excerpts from Scottish poetry is derived from Canto 6, stanza 17 (although it is often erroneously attributed to Shakespeare): "Oh, what a tangled web we weave,/ When first we practise to deceive!"
