= The Ambitious Stepmother =

1700 tragedy by Nicholas Rowe

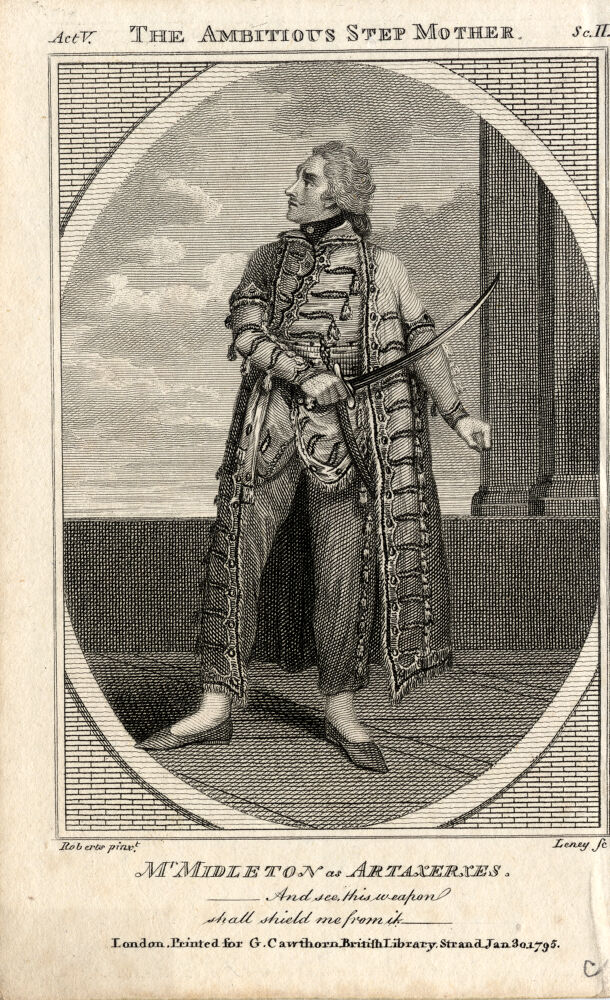
- James Middleton as Artaxerxes, 1795
- Original language: English
- Written by: Nicholas Rowe
- Genre: Tragedy

Premiere
- Date: December 1700
- Place: Lincoln's Inn Fields Theatre

The Ambitious Stepmother is a 1700 tragedy by the British writer Nicholas Rowe. It was his debut play. Rowe set his play in Biblical times, but it had strong subtexts of the contemporary questions about the British succession that led to the Act of Settlement in 1701. At the court of Persia, Artemisa schemes against her stepson Artaxerses.

The original cast included John Verbruggen as Artaxerses, Barton Booth as Artaban, Thomas Betterton as Memnon, John Bowman as Magas, George Pack as Cleanthes, Elizabeth Barry as Artemisa, Elizabeth Bowman as Cleone and Anne Bracegirdle as Amestris.

The play was dedicated to Edward Villiers, the Right Honourable Earl of Jersey, Lord Chamberlain of His Majesty's Household.

== List of characters ==
- Artaxerses - Prince of Persia, elder son to the King Arsaces by a former Queen.
- Artaban - Son to Arsaces, by Artemisa.
- Memnon - Formerly General to Arsaces, now disgrac'd, a friend to Artaxerses.
- Mirza - First Minister of State, in the interest of Artemisa and Artaban.
- Magas - Priest of the Sun, Friend to Mirza and the Queen.
- Cleanthes - Friend to Artaban
- Artemisa - Formerly the wife of Tiribatus, a Persian lord; now married to the King; and Queen of Persia.
- Cleone - Daughter to Mirza, in love with Artaxerses, and belov'd by Artaban.
- Amestris - Daughter to Memnon, in love with and belov'd by Artaxerses.
- Orchanes - Captain of the Guards to the Queen
- Beliza - Confident to Cleone

== Bibliography ==
- Burling, William J. A Checklist of New Plays and Entertainments on the London Stage, 1700-1737. Fairleigh Dickinson Univ Press, 1992.
- Francus, Marilyn. Monstrous Motherhood: Eighteenth-Century Culture and the Ideology of Domesticity. JHU Press, 2012.
- Engel, Laura & McGirr, Elaine M. Stage Mothers: Women, Work, and the Theater, 1660–1830. Bucknell University Press, 2014.
