= The Royal Convert =

1707 play

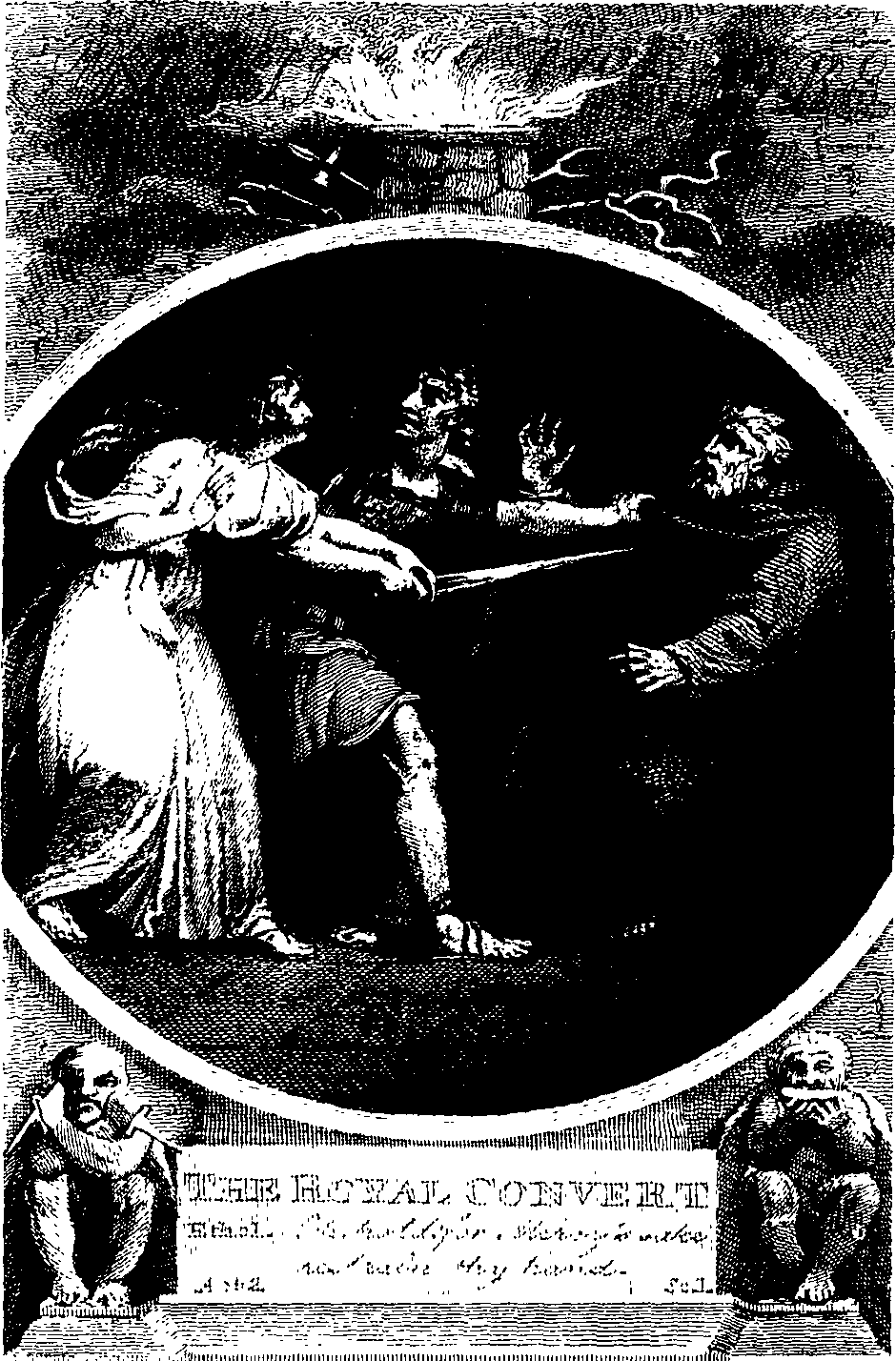
- Original language: English
- Written by: Nicholas Rowe
- Genre: Tragedy

Premiere
- Date: 25 November 1707
- Place: Queen's Theatre

The Royal Convert is a 1707 tragedy by the British writer Nicholas Rowe. The play is set in England during the Saxon era featuring two brothers in a love triangle with a young Christian woman.

It was staged at the Queen's Theatre in the Haymarket enjoying a compartiviely successful run for the era of five consecutive nights, followed later by two request performances. Barton Booth played the role of Hengist, King of Kent with Robert Wilks as his brother Aribert. John Mills was Seofrid, Benjamin Husband was Offa, Theophilus Keene was Rodogune, Elizabeth Barry appeared as Rodogune and Anne Oldfield as Ethelinda. Many of the actors in the play had appeared in Rowe's previous tragedy Ulysses.

Rowe dedicated the play to the Whig Junto member Lord Halifax. As with many of his works, the plot was in line with his Whig views and supported the prospect of a Hanoverian Succession rather than their rival Jacobites.

== Bibliography ==
- Burling, William J. A Checklist of New Plays and Entertainments on the London Stage, 1700-1737. Fairleigh Dickinson Univ Press, 1992.
- Caines, Michael in The Plays and Poems of Nicholas Rowe, Volume I: The Early Plays. Taylor & Francis, 2016.
