= Laurence Eusden =

English poet (1688–1730)

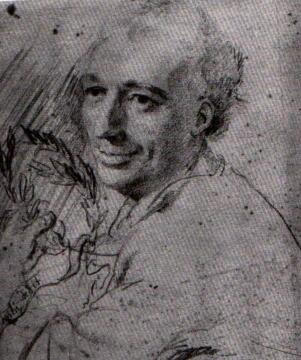

Poet Laureate of the United Kingdom
- In office 10 December 1718 – 27 September 1730
- Monarch: George I
- Preceded by: Nicholas Rowe
- Succeeded by: Colley Cibber

Personal details
- Born: 1688 (baptized 6 September) Spofforth, West Riding of Yorkshire, England
- Died: 27 September 1730 (aged 41-42) Coningsby, England

Laurence Eusden (bapt. 6 September 1688 – 27 September 1730) was an English poet who became Britain's youngest Poet Laureate in 1718.

== Life ==
Laurence Eusden was born in Spofforth in the West Riding of Yorkshire in 1688 (date unknown) to the Rev. Laurence Eusden, rector of Spofforth, Yorkshire. Eusden was baptized on 6 September 1688. He received his education at St Peter's School, York, and at Trinity College, Cambridge. He became a minor fellow of his college in 1711, and in the next year was admitted to a full fellowship.

Early on, Eusden had decided upon building a career through influence. For someone like him, well-educated, with a fellowship at Trinity, but without family money and without well-placed relations, there was no other way to advance in the world. He began to write, with the intention of using his ability to attract notice to himself. With a flattering poem on the Duke of Newcastle's marriage he succeeded – he was made Poet Laureate in 1718 by Newcastle, the Lord Chamberlain.

Eusden, who was 30 years old at the time of his appointment, was also the youngest Poet Laureate. Eusden secured this post due to the death of the previous Poet Laureate, Nicholas Rowe, and the recommendation of Joseph Addison. Upon his appointment, Eusden produced Birthday and New Year Odes for 12 years.

The last few years of his life were unhappy. He was ordained as a cleric in the 1720s, and assumed the office of rector of Coningsby, Lincolnshire, but his elevation to Poet Laureate brought him derision from his social and literary peers. Eusden died at Coningsby on 27 September 1730. He was buried at his church, St Michael and All Angels, in Coningsby.

== Poetry and criticism ==
Eusden's work is difficult to find. However, his The Origin Of The Knights Of The Bath, dedicated to the young William Augustus, later Duke of Cumberland, is available online. Its first 12 lines are reproduced below as an instance of Eusden's laudatory style:

The Origin Of The Knights Of The Bath

HAIL glorious Off-spring of a glorious Race!
Britannia's other Hope, and blooming Grace!
Thou smil'st already on the burnished Shield,
And thy weak Hand the little Sword can wield:
Already, clad in Arms, Thou mov'st along,
The Love and Wonder of each ravish'd Throng!
A-while vouchsafe, young Hero, to retire
'Mid Streams, and Grottos, and th'Aonian Choir:
Apollo, God of Fore-sight, who with Ease
Thy distant, ripen'd Years, as present, sees,
Bids all the Muses Thee receive with Pride,
To all the Muses by all Arts ally'd.

Though he produced many translations and gratulatory poems, Eusden's literary reputation is dominated by the satirical allusions of Alexander Pope's satire The Dunciad: e.g., "Know, Eusden thirsts no more for sack or praise; He sleeps among the dull of ancient days."

In addition to Pope's skewering of Eusden's abilities, Thomas Gray, author of "Elegy Written in a Country Churchyard", said that "Eusden set out well in life, but afterward turned out a drunkard and besotted his faculties".

== Notes ==
Court offices
Preceded by Nicholas Rowe	British Poet Laureate; 1718–1730	Succeeded by Colley Cibber
