= The Biter =

Play by Nicholas Rowe

- Original language: English
- Written by: Nicholas Rowe
- Genre: Comedy
- Setting: County fair, Croydon, early 1700s

Premiere
- Date: November 1704
- Place: Lincoln's Inn Fields Theatre

The Biter is a 1704 play by the English writer Nicholas Rowe. Rowe was better known for his tragedies but chose to try his hand at comedy. Performed at the Lincoln's Inn Fields Theatre, it was not a great success and lasted for about six performances. It was overshadowed by the more popular The Careless Husband by Colley Cibber, which appeared at the Drury Lane Theatre. It was Rowe's only play in a contemporary setting, and he rapidly turned back to historical tragedies beginning with Ulysses (1705). Some sources reported Rowe defiantly and loudly laughing at the jokes during a performance, even while nobody else did.

The original cast included Thomas Betterton as Sir Timothy Tallapoy, George Pack as Pinch, John Verbruggen as Clerimon and Mary Hodgson sang some of the songs. Barton Booth appeared as Friendly, Francis Leigh as Scribblescrabble, Francis Knapp as Bandileer, William Fieldhouse as Trick, John Freeman as Bohee, Elinor Leigh as Lady Stale, Susanna Mountfort as Angelica, Abigail Lawson as Mrs Scribblescrabble and Elizabeth Barry as Mrs. Clever. The epilogue was spoken by Anne Bracegirdle.

== Synopsis ==
At a country fair taking place near Croydon, the wealthy merchant Sir Timothy Tallapoy has arranged marriages for both himself and his daughter Angelica. However Angelica is really in love with another man, who also arrives at the fair pursued by Lady Stale an amorous, older widow.

== Bibliography ==
- Caines, Michael. The Plays and Poems of Nicholas Rowe, Volume II: The Middle Period Plays. Taylor & Francis, 2016.
- Van Lennep, W. The London Stage, 1660-1800: Volume Two, 1700-1729. Southern Illinois University Press, 1960.
