= Nicholas Rowe (writer) =

English poet and writer (1674–1718)

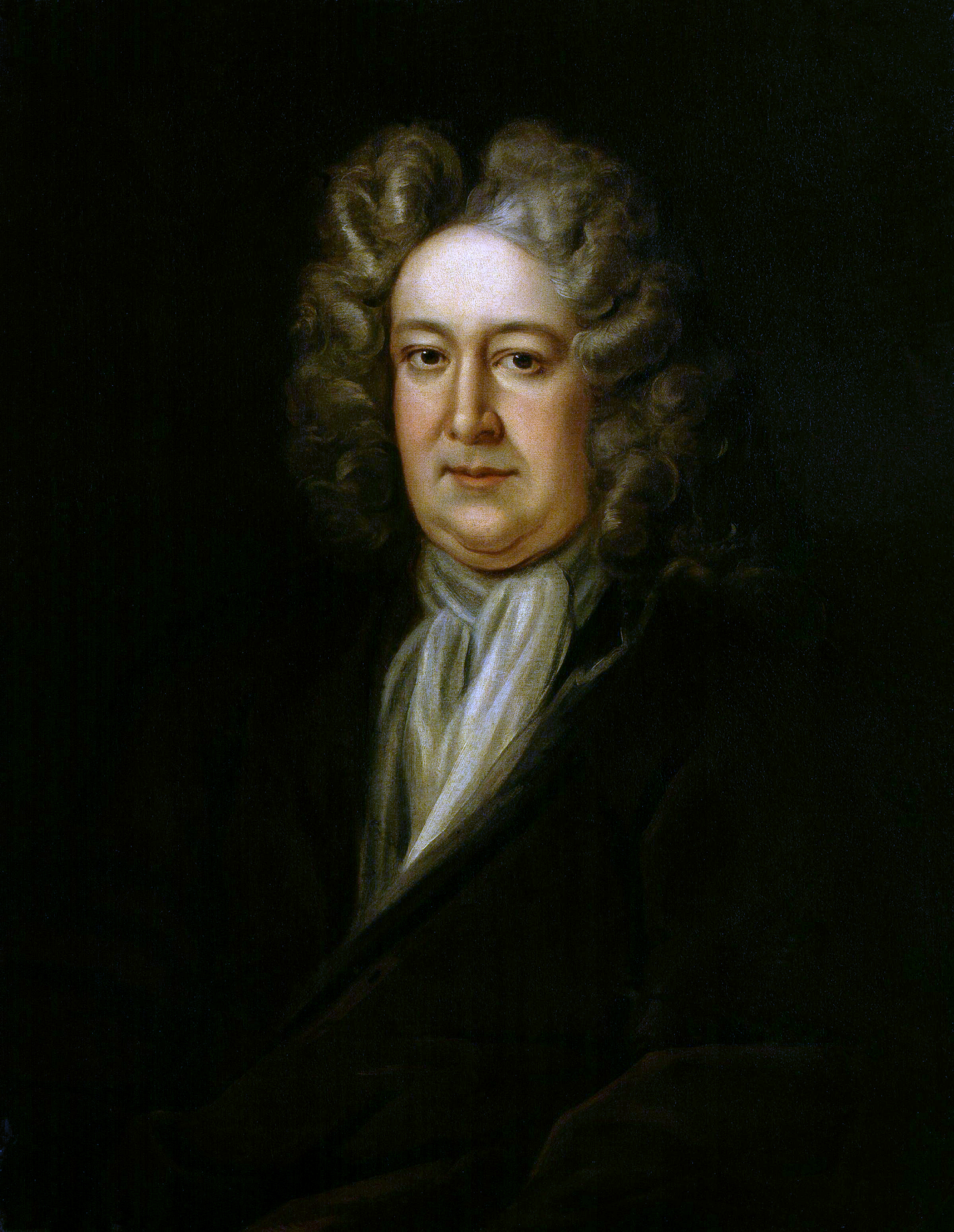
- Portrait possibly of Rowe

Poet Laureate of the United Kingdom
- In office 1 August 1715 – 6 December 1718
- Monarch: George I
- Preceded by: Nahum Tate
- Succeeded by: Laurence Eusden

Personal details
- Born: 20 June 1674 Little Barford, Bedfordshire, England
- Died: 6 December 1718 (aged 44) City of Westminster, London, England
- Resting place: Westminster Abbey
- Spouse: Anne Devenish (2nd wife)
- Children: John Rowe (from first wife); Charlotte Rowe (from second wife)
- Education: Westminster School

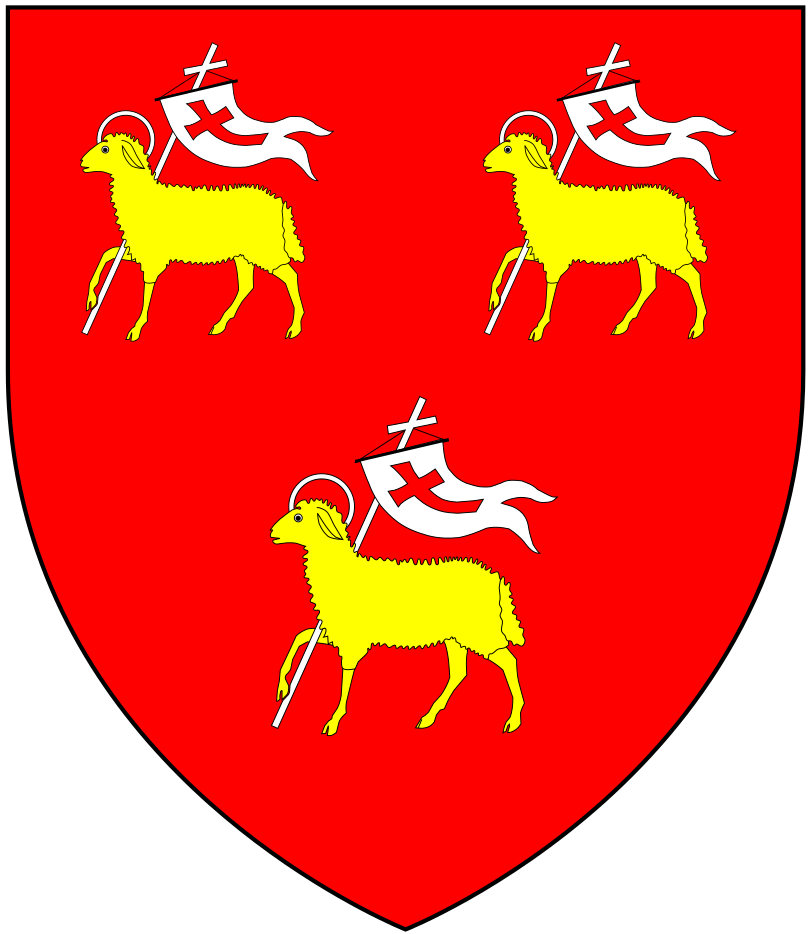
Arms of Rowe of Lamerton, Devon: Gules, three paschal lambs or staff cross and banners argent

Nicholas Rowe (/roʊ/; 20 June 1674 – 6 December 1718) was an English dramatist, poet and miscellaneous writer who was appointed Poet Laureate in 1715. His plays and poems were well-received during his lifetime, with one of his translations described as one of the greatest productions in English poetry. He was also considered the first editor of the works of William Shakespeare.

== Life ==
Nicholas Rowe was born in Little Barford, Bedfordshire, England, son of John Rowe (d. 1692), barrister and sergeant-at-law, and Elizabeth, daughter of Jasper Edwards, on 20 June 1674. His family possessed a considerable estate at Lamerton in Devonshire. His father practised law and published Benlow's and Dallison's Reports during the reign of King James II.

The future Poet Laureate was educated first at Highgate School, and then at Westminster School under the guidance of Richard Busby. In 1688, Rowe became a King's Scholar, which was followed by his entrance into Middle Temple in 1691. His entrance into Middle Temple was decided upon by his father, who felt that Rowe had made sufficient progress to qualify him to study law. While at Middle Temple, he read statutes and reports with proficiency proportionate to the force of his mind, which was already such that he endeavoured to comprehend law, not as a series of precedents, or collection of positive precepts, but as a system of rational government and impartial justice.

On his father's death, when he was nineteen, he became the master of an independent fortune. He was left to his own direction, and from that time ignored law to try his hand first at poetry, and then later at writing plays.

Rowe acted as under-secretary (1709–1711) to the Duke of Queensberry when he was principal secretary of state for Scotland. On the accession of George I, Rowe was made a surveyor of customs, and in 1715 he succeeded Nahum Tate as poet laureate.

He was also appointed clerk of the council to the Prince of Wales, and in 1718 was nominated by Lord Chancellor Parker as clerk of the presentations in Chancery. He died on 6 December 1718, and was buried in Westminster Abbey. A monument was erected to his memory in the Abbey by John Michael Rysbrack c. 1722.

The inscription on his tomb reads as follows:

To the Memory of NICHOLAS ROWE Esq: who died in 1718 Aged 45, And of Charlotte his only daughter the wife of Henry Fane Esq; who, inheriting her Father's Spirit, and Amiable in her own Innocence & Beauty, died in the 22nd year of her age 1739.

Thy Reliques, Rowe, to this sad Shrine we trust, and near thy Shakespear place thy honour'd Bust, Oh next him skill'ed to draw the tender Tear, For never Heart felt Passion more sincere: To nobler sentiment to fire the Brave. For never Briton more disdain'd a Slave: Peace to the gentle Shade, and endless Rest, Blest in thy Genius, in thy love too blest; And blest, that timely from Our Scene remov'd Thy Soul enjoys that Liberty it lov'd.

To these, so mourn'd in Death, so lov'd in Life! The childless Parent & the widow'd wife With tears inscribes this monument Stone, That holds their Ashes & expects her own.

Upon his death his widow received a pension from George I in 1719 in recognition of her husband's translation of Lucan. This verse translation, or rather paraphrase of the Pharsalia, was called by Samuel Johnson one of the greatest productions in English poetry, and was widely read, running through eight editions between 1718 and 1807.

== Family ==
Rowe was first married to Antonia Parsons in 1695 with whom he had a son John, born in 1699. John married Mary Hambly Rowe, with whom he had eight children. Antonia died in 1706. Rowe married again in 1717. His second wife was Anne Devenish, and they had a daughter named Charlotte. Charlotte died in 1739, leaving two children.

== Works ==
The Ambitious Stepmother, Rowe's first play, produced in 1700 at Lincoln's Inn Fields by Thomas Betterton and set in Persepolis, was well received. This was followed in 1701 by Tamerlane. In this play the conqueror Timur represented William III, and Louis XIV is denounced as Bajazet. It was for many years regularly acted on the anniversary of William's landing at Torbay. In Dublin in 1712, at a time when political passions were running high, the performance provoked a serious riot.

The Fair Penitent (1702, published 1703), an adaptation of Massinger and Field's The Fatal Dowry, was pronounced by Samuel Johnson as one of the most pleasing tragedies ever written in English. It featured the character of Lothario, whose name, as a result of this play, became synonymous with a rake (womaniser). Calista is said to have suggested to Samuel Richardson the character of Clarissa Harlowe, as Lothario suggested Lovelace. Samuel Johnson noted of The Fair Penitent, "The story is domestic, and therefore easily received by the imagination, and assimilated to common life; the diction is exquisitely harmonious, and soft or spritely as occasion requires."

In 1704, Rowe tried his hand at comedy, producing The Biter at Lincoln's Inn Fields, which was unsuccessful, and Rowe returned to tragedy in Ulysses (1705). According to Johnson, this play was to share the fate of many such plays based on mythological heroes, as, "We have been too early acquainted with the poetical heroes to expect any pleasure from their revival."

The Royal Convert (1707) was a story about a love triangle between two brothers, Hengist and Aribert, and a Christian woman named Ethelinda, who is martyred.

Jane Shore, professedly an imitation of Shakespeare's style, was played at Drury Lane with Anne Oldfield in the title role in 1714. It ran for nineteen nights, and kept the stage longer than any other of Rowe's works. In the play, which consists chiefly of domestic scenes and private distress, the wife is forgiven because she repents, and the husband is honoured because he forgives.

The Tragedy of Lady Jane Grey followed in 1715, and as this play was not successful, it was his last foray into the medium.

Rowe published the first 18th-century edition of William Shakespeare in seven volumes (six volumes of plays and a seventh of poems) in 1709–10 (printed by Tonson) and is also considered the first editor of Shakespeare. His practical knowledge of the stage helped him divide the plays into scenes (and sometime acts), with the entrances and exits of the players noted. He also normalised the spelling of names and prefixed each play with a list of the dramatis personae. This 1709–10 edition was also the first to be illustrated, a frontispiece engraving being provided for each play. Unfortunately, Rowe based his text on the corrupt Fourth Folio, a course which was followed by many later 18th-century editors who followed in his editorial footsteps. Rowe also wrote a short biography of Shakespeare, entitled, Some Account of the Life &c. of Mr. William Shakespear.

Rowe wrote occasional verses addressed to Godolphin and Halifax, adapted some of the odes of Horace to fit contemporary events, and translated the Caractères of Jean de La Bruyère and the Callipaedia of Claude Quillet. He also wrote a memoir of Boileau prefixed to a translation of the Lutrin. He also wrote a version of Lucan's Pharsalia.

== List of major works ==
Source: Nicholas Rowe in libraries (WorldCat catalog)

=== Poems ===
- A Poem upon the Late Glorious Successes of Her Majesty's Arms (1707)
- Unio (1707)
- Poems on Several Occasions (1714)
- Maecenas. Verses occasion'd by the honours conferr'd on the Right Honourable Earl of Halifax (1714)
- Ode for the New Year MDCCXVI (1716)

=== Original plays ===
- The Ambitious Stepmother (1700), a verse drama largely in blank verse
- Tamerlane (1701), a verse drama largely in blank verse
- The Biter (1704), a comedy in prose
- Ulysses (1705), a verse drama largely in blank verse
- The Royal Convert (1707), a verse drama largely in blank verse
- The Tragedy of Jane Shore (1714), a verse drama in imitation of Shakespeare's style
- Lady Jane Grey (1715), a verse drama largely in blank verse

=== Adaptations and translations ===
- The Fair Penitent (1702/3), an adaptation of Massinger and Field's The Fatal Dowry, a verse drama largely in blank verse, with some prose and song lyrics
- Lucan (1718), a paraphrase of the Pharsalia
- Callipaedia (1710), translation of Claude Quillet

=== Edited works ===
- The Works of William Shakespear (London: Jacob Tonson, 1709–10), first modern edition of the plays and poems

=== Miscellaneous works ===
- Memoir of Boileau (date unknown), prefixed to translation of Lutrin
- Some Account of the Life &c. of Mr. William Shakespear

== See also ==
- Shakespeare's editors

Court offices
Preceded by Nahum Tate	British Poet Laureate; 1715–1718	Succeeded by Laurence Eusden
