= William Miller (British publisher) =

English publisher (1769–1844)

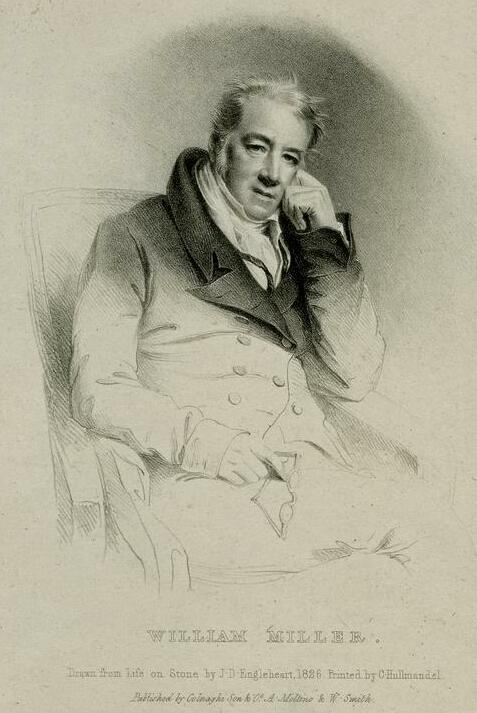
- Lithograph of William Miller, 1826
- Born: William Richard Beckford Miller; March 25, 1769; Bungay, Suffolk, UK
- Died: October 25, 1844 (aged 75); Dennington, Suffolk, UK
- Occupation: Publisher
- Years active: 1787–1812
- Father: Thomas Miller

William Richard Beckford Miller (25 March 1769 – 25 October 1844) was one of the leading English publishers of the late 18th and early 19th centuries, known for his popular and expensive titles. He began publishing on his own in 1790 at Bond Street in London. In 1812 he retired, aged 42, selling his business and 50 Albemarle Street, his London home, to John Murray, the second publisher of that name.

== Origins and early life ==
William Miller was born at Bungay, Suffolk, on 25 March 1769, the only son of Thomas Miller (1731–1804), a local bookseller and antiquarian, and Sally Kingsbury (1741–1773) of Waveney House, Bungay, daughter of a maltster. As William Miller tells in an unpublished memoir, his paternal grandfather was "a respectable Paviour", who completely repaved the streets of Norwich and Bury St. Edmund's.

When a youth William showed a talent and a taste for drawing, and Sir Joshua Reynolds advised that he enter the Royal Academy as a student. His stay at the academy proved short. In 1787 he was placed in Hookham's publishing house.

== Career as a publisher, 1790-1812 ==
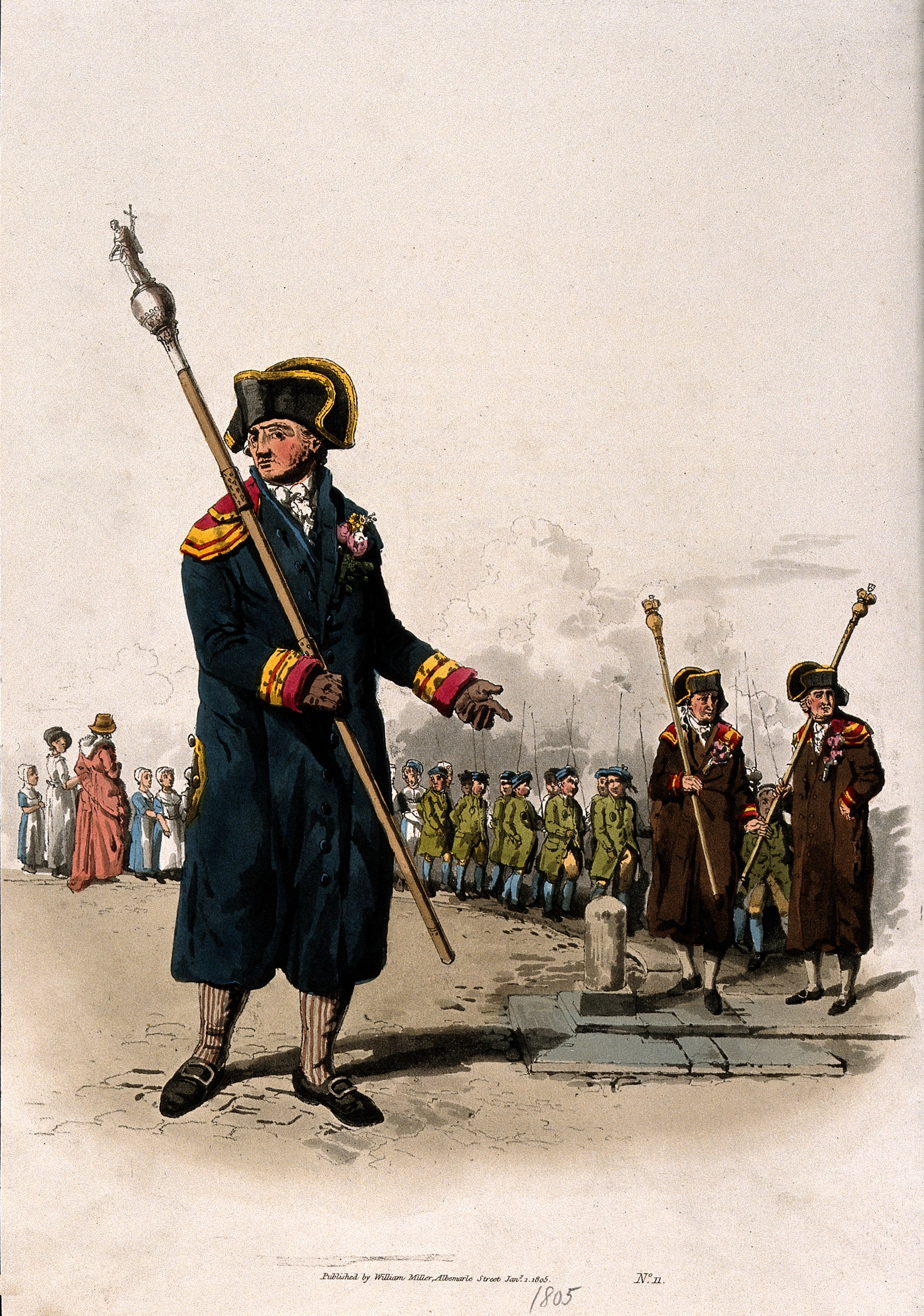
A beadle, carrying his staff, published by William Miller, Albemarle Street, 1 January 1805

In 1790 William Miller commenced business on his own account in Bond Street, London. The first book he issued was his uncle Dr. Edward Miller's Select Portions of the New Version of the Psalms of David, with Music.

A series of publications followed in large quarto, illustrating the costumes of various countries. Furnished with descriptions in English and French, they brought Miller considerable profit. Among his other successful ventures were Hewlett's Views of Lincolnshire, John Stoddart's Remarks upon Scotland and Forster's edition of the Arabian Nights Entertainments, illustrated by Robert Smirke. In 1804 Miller removed to a larger house in Albemarle Street, where he continued until his retirement from the publishing business. In 1812 Miller sold the premises, copyrights and business to John Murray for the considerable sum of £3,822, 12 shillings and sixpence.

During his last twelve years in business Miller issued some of "the most popular as well as expensive and splendid works" then published. The author of a 2005 collection of biographical notes about Miller and his family comments that while researching his life she came across numerous of William Miller's books "for sale at huge prices on the websites of antiquarian booksellers and auction houses". The British Library and the New York Public Library, she adds, both have "numerous illustrations from his books displayed on their sites".

=== Some of Miller's titles ===
Miller took a fourth share in certain popular poems by Sir Walter Scott ("Marmion", "The Lady of the Lake"), and was sole publisher of Scott's edition of The entire works of Dryden in 18 volumes octavo. He printed, in royal Quarto, The Costumes in coloured plates of China, Russia, Turkey, Austria and England, which he sold the rights of to Thomas McLean and John Murray after his retirement in 1812. At the other end of the scale, Miller issued The Miseries of Human Life by the Reverend J. Beresford, which he described as the "most popular little work of the day", passing through several editions in a few months.

He published The Antient Drama and The British Drama: Shakespeare in 7 volumes. He issued the antiquarian Francis Blomefield's History of Norfolk in a new edition of 10 volumes, Royal octavo, and Samuel Richardson's works in nineteen small octavo volumes. The Travels of Viscount Valentia, Sir Richard Colt Hoare's Giraldus Cambrensis and the same author's Ancient History of South Wiltshire, Vol. 1, were among his most splendid undertakings. His British Gallery was notable for the excellence of the engravings from "pictures of the Italian, French, Flemish, Dutch and English Schools now in the possession of the King and the Noblemen and Gentlemen of the United Kingdom".

After 14 years of retirement Miller published two quarto volumes of Biographical Sketches of British Characters recently deceased, commencing with the Accession of George the Fourth, with a list of their Engraved Portraits. He announced, but did not print, a continuation.

=== A less successful venture and an unfortunate decision ===
For the copyright of Charles James Fox's Historical Fragments (A History of the Reign of James II) Miller paid £4,500, hitherto the largest sum ever given for a literary property. Five thousand copies were printed in demy quarto, selling at £1.16s.0d. each; 250 copies on royal quarto, at £2.12s.6d. each; and fifty were printed upon elephant size quarto, selling at £5.0s.0d. a copy. Miller barely cleared his expenses by the speculation. It was, Miller wrote in 1841, "a lofty sum for a work of such scanty size & scanty merit".

More seriously, perhaps, in 1810 Miller turned down the chance to publish the young Lord Byron's epic poem "Childe Harold". This decision was supposedly taken because the poem attacked Miller's patron, Lord Elgin, as a "plunderer" (an opinion not a few Greeks would agree with). As a business decision it was unfortunate as John Murray II published it the following year with great success.

Byron, then 23 years old, wrote to William Miller (30 July 1811) from Reddish's Hotel, saying that he regretted that "you decline the publication, on my account, as I think the book would have done better in your hands". At the same time the author assured Miller that he could "perfectly conceive, and indeed approve your reasons, and assure you my sensations are not Archiepiscopal enough as yet to regret the rejection of my Homilies."

== Retirement and later life, 1812-1844 ==
In Beloe's Sexagenarian (vol. ii, pp. 270–271), William Miller is described as "the splendid bookseller", who "was enabled to retire to tranquillity and independence long before the decline of life, or infirmities of age, rendering it necessary to do so". In his private memoir written in 1841, however, Miller states (writing in the third person) that

"various circumstances connected with his extensive concerns, but which it is unnecessary to swell this memoir by detailing, induced him after long & mature deliberation to retire from business in 1812 when he was succeeded by the present Mr. John Murray."

Rather than having attained riches as his peers had been led to believe, Miller states that his "retirement from business was a bold & irretrievable act at the age of forty-two when he was thrown upon his own resources with a very scanty realized property and a young family to bring up, educate & send into the world." Miller took a farm in Hertfordshire, but after a brief experience of country life and five years on the continent, he removed to Duchess Street, Portland Place, in London.

He died on 25 October 1844, at Dennington (Suffolk), where his elder son, the Reverend Stanley Miller was the village priest.

== Family and descendants ==
In 1790, Miller married his cousin Mary, second daughter of his uncle Dr. Edward Miller, organist of Doncaster and composer of hymns ("When I survey the Wondrous Cross"). Sadly, Mary died the following year.

In 1799, Miller married again, choosing Susannah, daughter of the Reverend Richard Chapman of Bakewell in Derbyshire, as his bride. They had five children, of whom four—two sons and two daughters—survived into adulthood. There is a good portrait of Miller, engraved by E. Scriven, after a painting by Thomas Phillips R. A. Phillips also painted the Miller daughters, Ellen and Mary Anne, before they married.

Through Ellen, who married William Edward Crowfoot of Beccles, one of Edward Miller's descendants is the British Nobel Prize-winning Chemist, Dorothy Crowfoot Hodgkin (1910–1994).

The famous American author Ernest Hemingway (whose full name was Ernest Miller Hemingway) was descended from William Miller's granddaughter Mary, who emigrated to the US in the 1840s.

One of Miller's granddaughters, Ellen Clementina Carter, married the London bookseller and publisher David Nutt.
