= Lacy Ryan =

18th-century English actor (died 1760)

Lacy Ryan (c. 1694–1760) was an English actor who appeared at the Haymarket Theatre circa 1709.

== Life ==
By 1718 he had joined the company at Lincoln's Inn Fields, where he shared the lead with his friend James Quin. He took leading roles in Richard III and Hamlet with Anna Maria Seymour. In 1719 he appeared in the comedy Kensington Gardens by John Leigh.

In 1732 he followed the company to Covent Garden, and there, he remained until his death. Iago, Cassius, Edgar (in King Lear) and Macduff were among his best parts. Another signature part was the title role in Nathaniel Lee's tragedy Theodosius.

== Selected roles ==
- Valentine in The Wife's Relief by Charles Johnson (1711)
- Young Gentleman in The City Ramble by Elkanah Settle (1711)
- Marcus in Cato by Joseph Addison (1713)
- Astrolabe in The Wife of Bath by John Gay (1713)
- Arcas in The Victim by Charles Johnson (1714)
- Earl of Sussex in Lady Jane Grey by Nicholas Rowe (1715)
- Learchus in The Cruel Gift by Susanna Centlivre (1716)
- Sir Charles Briton in The Cobbler of Preston by Charles Johnson (1716)
- Osmyn in The Sultaness by Charles Johnson (1717)
- Vortimer in Lucius by Delarivier Manley (1717)
- Bellamy in The Coquet by Charles Molloy (1718)
- Sciarrah in The Traitor by Christopher Bullock (1718)
- Colonel Lovely in Kensington Gardens by John Leigh (1719)
- Charles in 'Tis Well if it Takes by William Taverner (1719)
- Howard in Sir Walter Raleigh by George Sewell (1719)
- Prince of Conde in Henry IV of France by Charles Beckingham (1719)
- Bellayr in The Half-Pay Officers by Charles Molloy (1720)
- Reynard in Whig and Tory by Benjamin Griffin (1720)
- Thrasimond in The Imperial Captives by John Mottley (1720)
- Antiochus in Antiochus by John Mottley (1721)
- Alphonso in The Fair Captive by Eliza Haywood (1721)
- O'Neill in Hibernia Freed by William Phillips (1722)
- Flaminius in Mariamne by Elijah Fenton (1723)
- Polynices in The Fatal Legacy by Jane Robe (1723)
- Leolin in Edwin by George Jeffreys (1724)
- Justinian in Belisarius by William Phillips (1724)
- Sprightly in The Bath Unmasked by Gabriel Odingsells (1725)
- Galliard in The Capricious Lovers by Gabriel Odingsells (1725)
- Colonel Severne in The Dissembled Wanton by Leonard Welsted (1726)
- Mourville in Money the Mistress by Thomas Southerne (1726)
- Ringwood in The Female Fortune Teller by Charles Johnson (1726)
- Fabius in The Fall of Saguntum by Philip Frowde (1727)
- Demetrius in Philip of Macedon by David Lewis (1727)
- Sesostris in Sesostris by John Sturmy (1728)
- Pallantus in The Virgin Queen by Richard Barford (1728)
- Aristides in Themistocles by Samuel Madden (1729)
- Duke of Wirtemberg in Frederick, Duke of Brunswick-Lunenburgh by Eliza Haywood (1729)
- Procles in Periander by John Tracy (1731)
- Philotas in Philotas by Philip Frowde (1731)
- Orestes in Orestes by Lewis Theobald (1731)
- Egistus in Merope by George Jeffreys (1731)
- Sir Harry Sprightly in The Married Philosopher by John Kelly (1732)
- Ferdinand in The Fatal Secret by Lewis Theobald (1733)
- Sir Harry Lovejoy in The Lady's Revenge by William Popple (1734)
- Freelove in The Rival Widows by Elizabeth Cooper (1735)
- Bellair in The Double Deceit by William Popple (1735)
- Gomez in The Happy Constancy by Hildebrand Jacob (1738)
- Belair in The Trial of Conjugal Love by Hildebrand Jacob (1738)
- Frankly in The Suspicious Husband by Benjamin Hoadly (1747)
