= Anne Parker (actress) =

British stage actress

Anne Parker (1696–1740) was a British stage actress of the eighteenth century. She is also known by her married names Anne Berriman and Anne Hallam.

She first appeared at the Lincoln's Inn Fields Theatre in 1720 as Regan in King Lear and Melinda in The Recruiting Officer and from 1723 she was a regular part of John Rich's company there. In 1726 she married a fellow Lincoln's Inn actor Joseph Berriman. Following his death in 1730 she remarried to another actor William Hallam and was known as Mrs Hallam for the remainder of her career.

From 1732 she moved with the rest of Rich's company to the newly-built Covent Garden Theatre. She became particularly known for her performances as Lady Macbeth. She died on 5 June 1740 and was buried in Mitcham.

== Selected roles ==
- Adeliza in Edwin by George Jeffreys (1724)
- Valeria in Belisarius by William Phillips (1724)
- Camilla in The Roman Maid by Robert Hurst (1724)
- Cleora in The Bath Unmasked by Gabriel Odingsells (1725)
- Mrs Fading in The Capricious Lovers by Gabriel Odingsells (1725)
- Astrea in The Female Fortune Teller by Charles Johnson (1726)
- Candace in The Fall of Saguntum by Philip Frowde (1727)
- Isteria in Philip of Macedon by David Lewis (1727)
- Nitocris in Sesostris by John Sturmy (1728)
- Adelaid in Frederick, Duke of Brunswick-Lunenburgh by Eliza Haywood (1729)
- Artemisia in Themistocles by Samuel Madden (1729)
- Antigona in Philotas by Philip Frowde (1731)
- Circe in Orestes by Lewis Theobald (1731)
- Merope in Merope by George Jeffreys (1731)
- Melissa in The Married Philosopher by John Kelly (1732)
- Duchess of Malfy in The Fatal Secret by Lewis Theobald (1733)
- Lady Traffick in The Lady's Revenge by William Popple (1734)
- Lady Lurcher in The Rival Widows by Elizabeth Cooper (1735)

== Bibliography ==
- Highfill, Philip H, Burnim, Kalman A. & Langhans, Edward A. A Biographical Dictionary of Actors, Actresses, Musicians, Dancers, Managers, and Other Stage Personnel in London, 1660–1800: Garrick to Gyngell. SIU Press, 1978.
