= Richard Diggs =

British actor

Richard Diggs (died 1727) was a British stage actor.

He was a member of the Dury Lane company before 1718, when he switched to join John Rich's company at the Lincoln's Inn Fields Theatre and remained there until his death.

== Selected roles ==
- Leander in The Coquet by Charles Molloy (1718)
- Rosny in Henry IV of France by Charles Beckingham (1719)
- Narbal in The Imperial Captives by John Mottley (1720)
- Truelove in Hob's Wedding by John Leigh (1720)
- Cleartes in Antiochus by John Mottley (1721)
- Arcas in Love and Duty by John Sturmy (1722)
- Galloper in The Compromise by John Sturmy (1722)
- Morvid in Edwin by George Jeffreys (1724)
- Vitiges in Belisarius by William Phillips (1724)
- Sharper in The Bath Unmasked by Gabriel Odingsells (1725)
- Governor of Tangier in Money the Mistress by Thomas Southerne (1726)
- Lychormas in The Fall of Saguntum by Philip Frowde (1727)

== Bibliography ==
- Highfill, Philip H, Burnim, Kalman A. & Langhans, Edward A. A Biographical Dictionary of Actors, Actresses, Musicians, Dancers, Managers, and Other Stage Personnel in London, 1660-1800: Volume VIII. SIU Press, 1978.
- Johanson, Kristine. Shakespeare Adaptations from the Early Eighteenth Century: Five Plays. Rowman & Littlefield, 2013.
