= Thomas Chapman (actor) =

British actor

Thomas Chapman (1683-1747) was a British stage actor.

A long-standing member of John Rich's Lincoln's Inn Fields Theatre company, he was popular for his comedy roles. Although he also played in tragic plays, his reception for them were less acclaimed.

== Selected roles ==
- Meanwell in The Impertinent Lovers by Francis Hawling (1723)
- Beggar in The Beggar's Opera by John Gay (1728)
- Dion in Sesostris by John Sturmy (1728)
- Mirza in The Virgin Queen by Richard Barford (1728)
- Ridolpho in Frederick, Duke of Brunswick-Lunenburgh by Eliza Haywood (1729)
- Artaban in Themistocles by Samuel Madden (1729)
- Dogrel in The Wife of Bath by John Gay (1730)
- Constant in The Coffee House Politician by Henry Fielding (1730)
- Alcander in Periander by John Tracy (1731)
- Lysimachus in Philotas by Philip Frowde (1731)
- Nicanor in Merope by George Jeffreys (1731)
- Barzanes in Orestes by Lewis Theobald (1731)
- Brush in The Married Philosopher by John Kelly (1732)
- Marquise of Pescara in The Fatal Secret by Lewis Theobald (1733)
- Sir Lively Brainless in The Lady's Revenge by William Popple (1734)
- Young Modern in The Rival Widows by Elizabeth Cooper (1735)
- Jerry in The Double Deceit by William Popple (1735)
- Tatterdemalion in The Prodigal Reform’d by Hildebrand Jacob (1738)
- Lopez in The Happy Constancy by Hildebrand Jacob (1738)
- Touchstone in As You Like It by William Shakespeare (1740)

== Bibliography ==
- Highfill, Philip H, Burnim, Kalman A. & Langhans, Edward A. A Biographical Dictionary of Actors, Actresses, Musicians, Dancers, Managers, and Other Stage Personnel in London, 1660-1800: Garrick to Gyngell. SIU Press, 1978.
- Straub, Kristina, G. Anderson, Misty and O'Quinn, Daniel . The Routledge Anthology of Restoration and Eighteenth-Century Drama. Taylor & Francis, 2017.
