= John Egleton =

British actor

John Egleton (1698-1727) was a British stage actor.

He was a member of the Lincoln's Inn Fields company between 1717 and 1726, and also routinely performed at the summer fairs in London. In 1721 he married the actress Jane Giffard.

== Selected roles ==
- Florio in The Traitor by Christopher Bullock (1718)
- Ranger in The Coquet by Charles Molloy (1718)
- Varnish in Kensington Gardens by John Leigh (1719)
- Ravillac in Henry IV of France by Charles Beckingham (1719)
- Carew in Sir Walter Raleigh by George Sewell (1719)
- Honoric in The Imperial Captives by John Mottley (1720)
- Woodville in Hob's Wedding by John Leigh (1720)
- Arsaces in Antiochus by John Mottley (1721)
- Achmat in The Fair Captive by Eliza Haywood (1721)
- Jerry in Hanging and Marriage by Henry Carey (1722)
- Idas in Love and Duty by John Sturmy (1722)
- O'Connor in Hibernia Freed by William Phillips (1722)
- Attalus in The Fatal Legacy by Jane Robe (1723)
- Macro in Belisarius by William Phillips (1724)
- Pander in The Bath Unmasked by Gabriel Odingsells (1725)

== Bibliography ==
- Highfill, Philip H, Burnim, Kalman A. & Langhans, Edward A. A Biographical Dictionary of Actors, Actresses, Musicians, Dancers, Managers, and Other Stage Personnel in London, 1660-1800: Garrick to Gyngell. SIU Press, 1978.
- Johanson, Kristine. Shakespeare Adaptations from the Early Eighteenth Century: Five Plays. Rowman & Littlefield, 2013.
