= Charles Hulett =

British actor

Charles Hulett (c.1700-1735) was a British stage actor. His name is sometimes written as Charles Hulet.

Hulett was the son of John Hulett, a Yeomen of the Guard and Steward to the Earl of Northampton. Born in Bloomsbury, he acted as an apprentice to the bookseller Edmund Curll for two years before turning to acting. It is possible he may have first acted in Dublin, but his first known role was as Lennox in Macbeth at the Lincoln's Inn Fields Theatre on 26 October 1721. Possibly under the guidance of James Quin, he became an established member of the Lincoln's Inn Fields company. His long standing association ended in 1732 just as John Rich took the company to the new Covent Garden Theatre.

Hulett then joined Henry Giffard at the Goodman's Fields Theatre in Whitechapel where he acted until his death, with occasional appearances at other theatres.

== Selected roles ==
- Tudor in Edwin by George Jeffreys (1724)
- Carus in The Roman Maid by Robert Hurst (1724)
- Philip in Philip of Macedon by David Lewis (1727)
- Theron in The Fall of Saguntum by Philip Frowde (1727)
- Chaunter in The Beggar's Wedding by Charles Coffey (1729)
- Welford in Sylvia by George Lillo (1730)
- Spigot in The Wife of Bath by John Gay (1730)
- Craterus in Philotas by Philip Frowde (1731)
- Argaleon in Merope by George Jeffreys (1731)
- Magician in Orestes by Lewis Theobald (1731)
- Odway in The Married Philosopher by John Kelly (1732)
- Hali-Vizem in Scanderbeg by William Havard (1733)

== Bibliography ==
- Highfill, Philip H, Burnim, Kalman A. & Langhans, Edward A. A Biographical Dictionary of Actors, Actresses, Musicians, Dancers, Managers, and Other Stage Personnel in London, 1660-1800: Garrick to Gyngell. SIU Press, 1978.
