= Hibernia Freed =

1722 play

- Written by: William Phillips
- Original language: English
- Genre: Tragedy

Premiere
- Date premiered: 13 February 1722
- Place premiered: Lincoln's Inn Fields Theatre

Hibernia Freed is a 1722 tragedy by the writer William Phillips. It is set during the ninth century during the Viking Invasion of Ireland. It was part of a growing Anglo-Irish interest in traditional Irish history, and part of a tendency to switch tragedy from Ancient Rome or Greece to more native settings.

It has similarities with Charles Shadwell's Rotherick O'Connor, King of Connaught (1719) but whereas that was a Whig-supporting play, Phillips was a Tory with Jacobite leanings. Shadwell portrayed the Norman Invasion of Ireland in a positive light, drawing parallels to William III's more recent victory there while Phillips portrays the Irish justly defending their country against Viking tyranny. He dedicated the play to Henry O'Brien, Earl of Thomond an Irish aristocrat of Gaelic background.

The original Lincoln Inn's Field cast consisted of Anthony Boheme as O'Brien, Lacy Ryan as O'Neill, Charles Hulet as Herimon, John Egleton as O'Connor, Thomas Rogers as Eugenius, James Quin as Tergesius, Thomas Walker as Erric, Anna Maria Seymour as Sabina, Jane Rogers as Agnes.

== Plot ==
Besieged on the Hill of Tara by the invading Viking king Tergesius, the King of Ireland O'Brien waits for help from the Ulster leader O'Neill.

== Bibliography ==
- Burling, William J. A Checklist of New Plays and Entertainments on the London Stage, 1700-1737. Fairleigh Dickinson Univ Press, 1992.
- Morash, Christopher. A History of Irish Theatre 1601-2000. Cambridge University Press, 2002.
- Nicoll, Allardyce. A History of Early Eighteenth Century Drama: 1700-1750. CUP Archive, 1927.
