= William Milward =

British actor

William Milward (1702–1742) was a British stage actor.

He began his career with John Rich's company at the Lincoln's Inn Fields Theatre and also appeared at the Haymarket. From 1734 he became part of the company at Drury Lane where he remained for the rest of his career.

== Selected roles ==
- Wingrave in Money the Mistress by Thomas Southerne (1726)
- Curtius in The Fall of Saguntum by Philip Frowde (1727)
- Antigonus in Philip of Macedon by David Lewis (1727)
- Eumenes in The Virgin Queen by Richard Barford (1728)
- Pahnes in Sesostris by John Sturmy (1728)
- Anspach in Frederick, Duke of Brunswick-Lunenburgh by Eliza Haywood (1729)
- Mardonius in Themistocles by Samuel Madden (1729)
- Merit in The Wife of Bath by John Gay (1730)
- Araxes in Orestes by Lewis Theobald (1731)
- Aristedes in Periander by John Tracy (1731)
- Arsaces in Philotas by Philip Frowde (1731)
- Polydorus in Merope by George Jeffreys (1731)
- Young Bellefleur in The Married Philosopher by John Kelly (1732)
- Antonio in The Fatal Secret by Lewis Theobald (1733)
- Titus in Junius Brutus by William Duncombe (1734)
- Scandenberg in The Christian Hero by George Lillo (1735)
- Valentine in The Man of Taste by James Miller (1735)
- Lusignan in Zara by Aaron Hill (1736)
- Gratiano in The Universal Passion by James Miller (1737)
- First brother in Comus by Thomas Arne (1738)
- Egistus in Agamemnon by James Thomson (1738)
- Lanertes in The Fatal Retirement by Anthony Brown (1739)
- Mustapha in Mustapha by David Mallet (1739)
- Conrade in Elmerick by George Lillo (1740)

== Bibliography ==
- Highfill, Philip H, Burnim, Kalman A. & Langhans, Edward A. A Biographical Dictionary of Actors, Actresses, Musicians, Dancers, Managers, and Other Stage Personnel in London, 1660-1800: Garrick to Gyngell. SIU Press, 1978.
- Straub, Kristina, G. Anderson, Misty and O'Quinn, Daniel . The Routledge Anthology of Restoration and Eighteenth-Century Drama. Taylor & Francis, 2017.
