= Jane Rogers (actress, died 1739) =

British actress

Jane Rogers (died 1739) was a British stage actress.

She was the illegitimate daughter of the actor Robert Wilks and Jane Rogers an actress. To distinguish her from her mother she was sometimes known as Jane Rogers the Younger.

In 1717 she married Christopher Bullock, an actor-manager at the Lincoln's Inn Fields Theatre. He died in 1722 from consumption, after they had three children together. She continued to be a popular actress at Lincoln's Inn, and in 1732 moved with the rest of the company to the new Covent Garden Theatre. In 1736 as her career drew to a close she received a benefit performance at Covent Garden, and the following year another benefit was held at the Smock Alley Theatre in Dublin. She died in Ireland two years later and was buried at Glasnevin.

== Selected roles ==
- Louisa in The Northern Heiress (1716)
- Selinda in The Perfidious Brother (1716)
- Mrs Winwife in The Artful Husband (1717)
- Amidea in The Traitor (1718)
- Semanthe in Scipio Africanus (1718)
- Mrs Lovely in A Bold Stroke for a Wife (1718)
- Corinna in 'Tis Well if it Takes (1719)
- Olympia in Sir Walter Raleigh (1719)
- Charlotta in Henry IV of France (1719)
- Sophronia in The Imperial Captives (1720)
- Mary in Hob's Wedding (1720)
- Agnes in Hibernia Freed (1722)
- Harriet in The Compromise (1722)
- Antigona in The Fatal Legacy (1723)
- Arsinoe in Mariamne (1723)
- Liberia in The Bath Unmasked (1725)
- Frizle in The Capricious Lovers (1725)
- Harriet in Money the Mistress (1726)
- Emilia in The Dissembled Wanton (1726)
- Timandra in The Fall of Saguntum (1727)
- Valeria in The Tuscan Treaty (1733)
- Laetitia Lovejoy in The Lady's Revenge by William Popple (1734)

== Bibliography ==
- Highfill, Philip H, Burnim, Kalman A. & Langhans, Edward A. A Biographical Dictionary of Actors, Actresses, Musicians, Dancers, Managers, and Other Stage Personnel in London, 1660-1800: Garrick to Gyngell. SIU Press, 1978.
