= The Fair Captive =

Play by Eliza Haywood

- Original language: English
- Written by: Eliza Haywood
- Genre: Tragedy

Premiere
- Date: 4 March 1721
- Place: Lincoln's Inn Fields Theatre

The Fair Captive is a 1721 tragedy by the British writer Eliza Haywood.

Performed at the Lincoln's Inn Fields Theatre the cast featured James Quin as Mustapha, John Leigh as Ozmin, Anthony Boheme as Haly, Lacy Ryan as Alphonso, John Egleton as Achmat and Anna Maria Seymour as Isabella. The epilogue, comic in contrast to the play's tragedy, was written by Aaron Hill.

== Bibliography ==
- Burling, William J. A Checklist of New Plays and Entertainments on the London Stage, 1700-1737. Fairleigh Dickinson Univ Press, 1992.
- Gerrard, Christine. Aaron Hill: The Muses' Projector, 1685-1750. Oxford University Press, 2003.
- King, Kathryn R. A Political Biography of Eliza Haywood. Routledge, 2015.
