= Sylvia (opera) =

1730 ballad opera

- Original language: English
- Written by: George Lillo
- Genre: Comedy

Premiere
- Date: 10 November 1730
- Place: Lincoln's Inn Fields Theatre, London

Sylvia is a 1730 ballad opera by the British writer George Lillo, written as part of a boom in ballad operas in the wake of John Gay's 1728 hit The Beggar's Opera.

The original cast included Thomas Walker as Sir John Freeman, Charles Hulett as Welford, John Hippisley as Jonathon and Jane Egleton as Betty.

== Bibliography ==
- Burling, William J. A Checklist of New Plays and Entertainments on the London Stage, 1700-1737. Fairleigh Dickinson Univ Press, 1992.
- Nicoll, Allardyce. A History of Early Eighteenth Century Drama: 1700-1750. CUP Archive, 1927.
