= Mariamne (Fenton play) =

1723 play

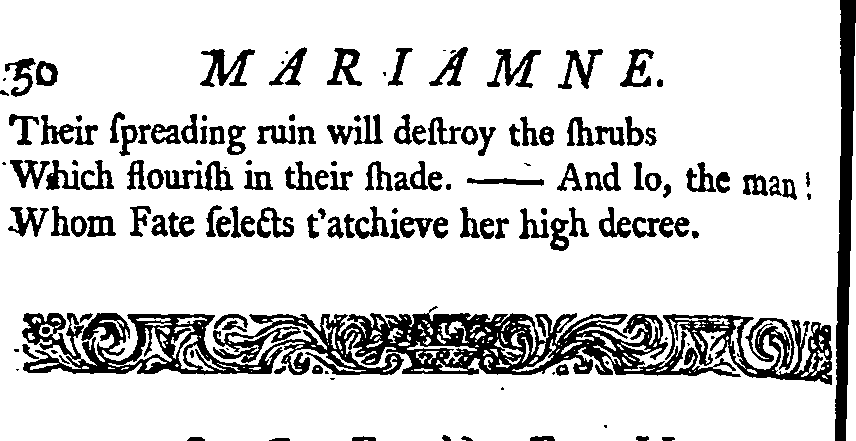
- Written by: Elijah Fenton
- Original language: English
- Genre: Tragedy

Premiere
- Date premiered: 22 February 1723
- Place premiered: Lincoln's Inn Fields Theatre

Mariamne is a 1723 tragedy play by the British writer Elijah Fenton. It is based on the biblical Mariamne, wife of Herod the Great of Judea. The following year Voltaire produced a French play of the same title.

Staged at the Lincoln's Inn Fields Theatre the original cast included Anna Maria Seymour as Mariamne, Anthony Boheme as Herod, Jane Egleton as Salome, Thomas Walker as Pheroras, Jane Rogers as Arsinoe, James Quin as Sohemus, Lacy Ryan as Flaminius and John Leigh as the High Priest.

== Bibliography ==
- Burling, William J. A Checklist of New Plays and Entertainments on the London Stage, 1700-1737. Fairleigh Dickinson Univ Press, 1992.
