= The Dissembled Wanton =

1726 play

- Original language: English
- Written by: Leonard Welsted
- Genre: Comedy

Premiere
- Date: 14 December 1726
- Place: Lincoln's Inn Fields Theatre

The Dissembled Wanton is a 1726 comedy play by the British writer Leonard Welsted.

The original Lincoln's Inn Fields cast included James Quin as Lord Severne, Lacy Ryan as Colonel Severne, Thomas Walker as Beaufort, William Bullock as Toby, John Hippisley as Wormwood, Jane Rogers as Emilia, Elizabeth Younger as Sir Harry Truelove and Jane Egleton as Lettice.

== Bibliography ==
- Burling, William J. A Checklist of New Plays and Entertainments on the London Stage, 1700-1737. Fairleigh Dickinson Univ Press, 1992.
- Nicoll, Allardyce. History of English Drama, 1660-1900, Volume 2. Cambridge University Press, 2009.
