= James Quin =

18th-century Anglo-Irish actor (1693–1766)

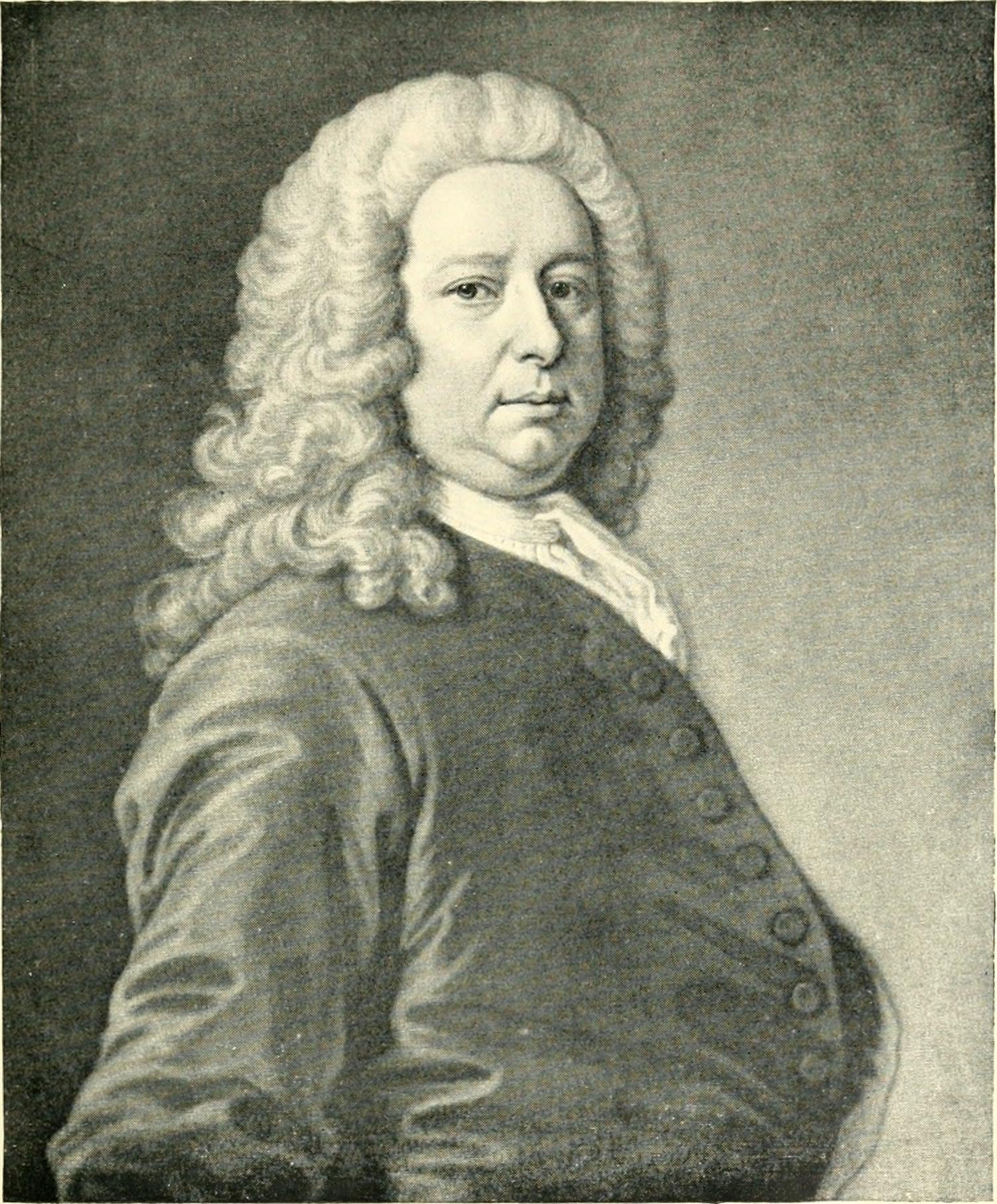
- James Quin (From an engraving by John Faber after Thomas Hudson)
- Born: 24 February 1693; London, England
- Died: 21 January 1766 (aged 72)
- Criminal charges: Manslaughter of William Bowen
- Parent: Henry Baker

James Quin (24 February 1693 – 21 January 1766) was an English actor of Irish descent.

== Life ==
Quin was born in King Street, Covent Garden, London, an illegitimate son of James Quin, an Irish-born barrister, and his partner (whom he apparently never lawfully married) Mrs. Grinsell. He was the grandson of Mark Quin, Lord Mayor of Dublin in 1667–8. William Whitshed, Lord Chief Justice of Ireland, was his first cousin. He was educated in Dublin, and probably spent some time at Trinity College, Dublin. His grandfather, the Lord Mayor of Dublin, who caused a sensation by committing suicide in Christ Church Cathedral, Dublin, in 1674, supposedly because of his wife's infidelity, was one of the richest men in Dublin. James unsuccessfully claimed a share of the family fortune, but he could not prove that his parents had been lawfully married, since his mother had a previous husband who was still alive.

Soon after his father's death in 1710, he made his first appearance on the stage at Abel in Sir Robert Howard's The Committee at the Smock Alley Theatre. Quin's first London engagement was in small parts at Drury Lane, and he secured his first triumph at Bajazet in Nicholas Rowe's Tamerlane, on 8 November 1715. The next year he appeared as Hotspur at Lincoln's Inn Fields Theatre, where he remained for fourteen years.

On 10 July 1718, he was convicted of manslaughter for having killed William Bowen, another actor, in a duel which the victim had himself provoked. Quin was not severely punished, the affair being regarded as more of an accident than a crime. The public took a similar view of another episode in which Quin, on being attacked by a young actor who had been angered by the sarcastic criticism of his superior, drew his sword upon him and killed him.

He took leading roles in Othello and Macbeth with Anna Maria Seymour as leading actress.

But if he was eager in his own defence he was no less so in that of others. In 1721 a drunken nobleman reeled onto the stage of the theatre and assaulted the manager, Rich, whose life was saved by Quin's prompt armed interference. This resulted in a riot, and thereafter a guard was stationed in all theatres. In 1732 Quin appeared at Covent Garden, returning to Drury Lane from 1734 to 1741, and in 1742 was again at Covent Garden, where he remained until the close of his career. On 14 November 1746 Quin played Horatio and Garrick Lothario to the Calista of Mrs Cibber in The Fair Penitent. The applause of the audience was so great as to disconcert if not actually to alarm the two actors.

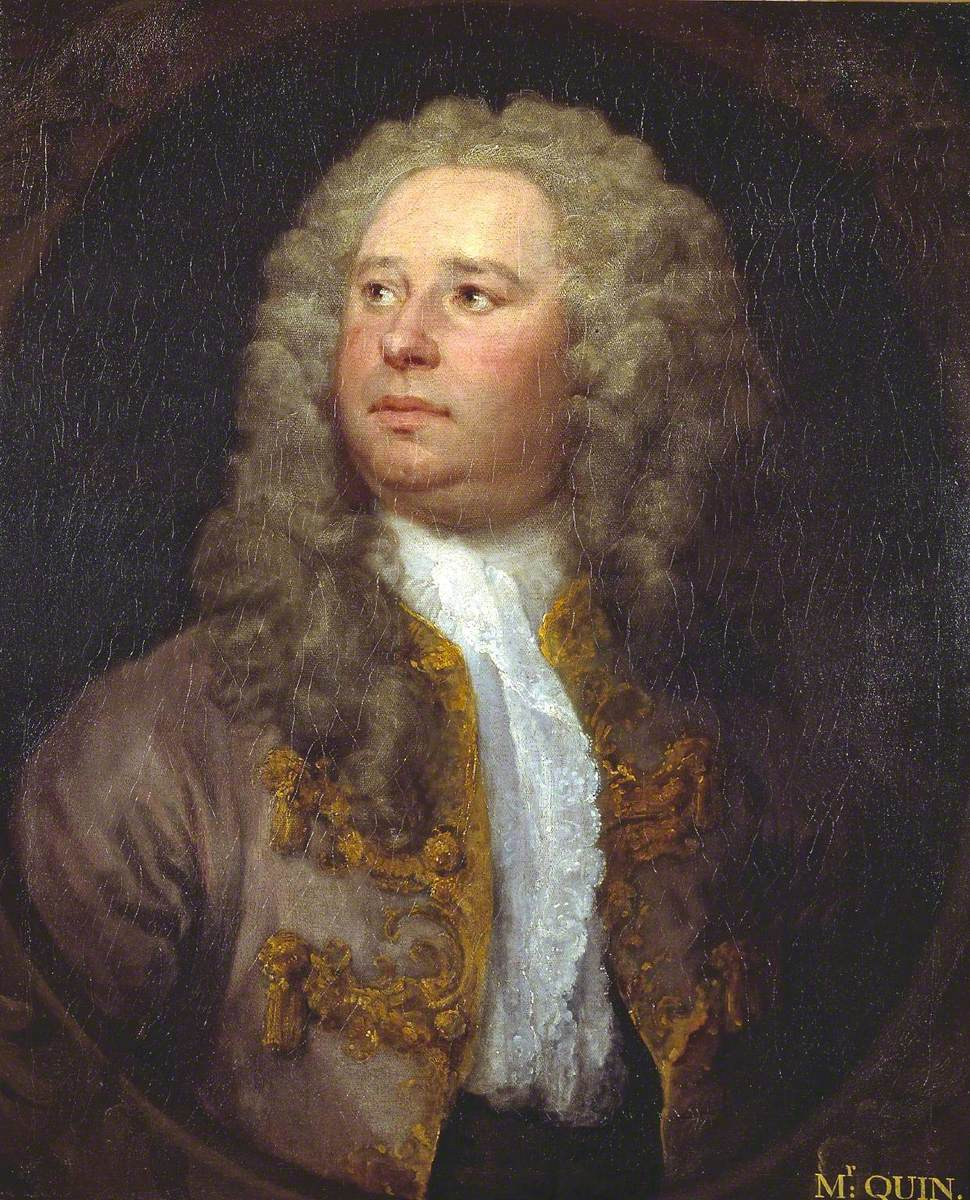
Portrait by William Hogarth, 1739

Public interest was yet more keenly stimulated in comparing Garrick's and Quin's impersonations of Richard III, the popular verdict being loudly in favour of Garrick. But Quin's Falstaff in King Henry IV was emphatically preferred to the Hotspur of his rival. In consequence of an attempt made by Garrick in 1750–51 to draw him away from Covent Garden, Quin was enabled to extort from his manager a salary of £1000 a year, the highest figure then reached in the profession. Quin's last regular appearance was on 15 May 1757, as Horatio in the Fair Penitent, though in the following year he twice played Falstaff for the benefit of friends. He had retired to Bath, where he lived a happy life, with late hours and much eating and drinking, until his death on 21 January 1766. He was buried in the abbey church at Bath.

Some coolness which had arisen between Quin and Garrick before the former's retirement was dissipated on their subsequent meeting at Chatsworth at the duke of Devonshire's, and Quin paid many a visit to Garrick's villa at Hampton in the latter part of his life. The epitaph in verse on his tomb was written by Garrick. Quin's will displayed a generous nature, and among numerous bequests was one of fifty pounds to "Mr Thomas Gainsborough, limner."

In the Garrick Club in London are two portraits of the actor ascribed to Hogarth, and a portrait by Gainsborough is in Buckingham Palace. His personality was not gracious. His jokes were coarse; his temper irascible; his love of food, his important airs, and his capacity for deep drinking do not command respect; on the other hand, a few of his jokes were excellent, and there was no rancour in him. On many occasions, he showed his willingness to help persons in distress. His character is summarised by Smollett in Humphry Clinker. As an actor his manner was charged with an excess of gravity and deliberation; his pauses were so portentous as in some situations to appear even ludicrous, but he was well fitted for the delivery of Milton's poetry, and for the portrayal of the graver roles in his repertory.

== Selected roles ==
- Lieutenant of the Tower in Lady Jane Grey by Nicholas Rowe (1715)
- Vulture in The Country Lasses by Charles Johnson (1715)
- Rovewell in The Contrivances by Henry Carey (1715)
- Antenor in The Cruel Gift by Susanna Centlivre (1716)
- Scipio in Scipio Africanus by Charles Beckingham (1718)
- Lorenzo in The Traitor by Christopher Bullock (1718)
- Careful in 'Tis Well if it Takes by William Taverner (1719)
- Henry in Henry IV of France by Charles Beckingham (1719)
- Walter Raleigh in Sir Walter Raleigh by George Sewell (1719)
- Genseric in The Imperial Captives by John Mottley (1720)
- Selecus in Antiochus by John Mottley (1721)
- Bellmour in Fatal Extravagance by Aaron Hill (1721)
- Mustapha in The Fair Captive by Eliza Haywood (1721)
- Tergesius in Hibernia Freed by William Phillips (1722)
- Creon in The Fatal Legacy by Jane Robe (1723)
- Sohemus in Mariamne by Elijah Fenton (1723)
- Gomel in Edwin by George Jeffreys (1724)
- Hermogenes in Belisarius by William Phillips (1724)
- Lord Severne in The Dissembled Wanton by Leonard Welsted (1726)
- Spring in The Female Fortune Teller by Charles Johnson (1726)
- Warcourt in Money the Mistress by Thomas Southerne (1726)
- Didas in Philip of Macedon by David Lewis (1727)
- Eurydamas in The Fall of Saguntum by Philip Frowde (1727)
- Artaxerses in The Virgin Queen by Richard Barford (1728)
- Themistocles in Themistocles by Samuel Madden (1729)
- Cound Waldec in Frederick, Duke of Brunswick-Lunenburgh by Eliza Haywood (1729)
- Clitus in Philotas by Philip Frowde (1731)
- Periander in Periander by John Tracy (1731)
- Glycon in Merope by George Jeffreys (1731)
- Thoas in Orestes by Lewis Theobald (1731)
- Old Bellefleur in The Married Philosopher by John Kelly (1732)
- Bosola in The Fatal Secret by Lewis Theobald (1733)
- Lycomedes, King of Scyros in Achilles by John Gay (1733)
- Amurath in The Christian Hero by George Lillo (1735)
- Mondish in The Universal Gallant by Henry Fielding (1735)
- Protheus in The Universal Passion by James Miller (1737)
- Outside in Art and Nature by James Miller (1738)
- Agamemnon in Agamemnon by James Thomson (1738)
- Solyman in Mustapha by David Mallet (1739)
- Elmerick in Elmerick by George Lillo (1740)

== Sources ==
- Lee, Sidney, ed. (1896). "Quin, James" . Dictionary of National Biography. Vol. 47. London: Smith, Elder & Co.
