= The Lady's Revenge =

1734 play

- Original language: English
- Written by: William Popple
- Genre: Comedy

Premiere
- Date: 9 January 1734
- Place: Covent Garden Theatre

The Lady's Revenge, or the Rover Reclaim'd is a 1734 comedy play by the British writer William Popple.

The original Covent Garden cast included Lacy Ryan as Sir Harry Lovejoy, Thomas Walker as Heartly, Thomas Chapman as Sir Lively Brainless, Jane Rogers as Laetitia Lovejoy, Anne Hallam as Lady Traffick and Elizabeth Younger as Betty. The prologue and epilogue were written by Aaron Hill. The play was dedicated to Frederick, Prince of Wales and according to Popple this led to criticism of the work by those opposed to the government.

== Bibliography ==
- Burling, William J. A Checklist of New Plays and Entertainments on the London Stage, 1700-1737. Fairleigh Dickinson Univ Press, 1992.
- Nicoll, Allardyce. A History of Early Eighteenth Century Drama: 1700-1750. CUP Archive, 1927.
- Rumbold, Valerie. The Dunciad in Four Books. Routledge, 2014.
