= A City Ramble =

Play by Charles Knipe

- Written by: Charles Knipe
- Original language: English
- Genre: Comedy

Premiere
- Date premiered: 2 June 1715
- Place premiered: Lincoln's Inn Fields Theatre, London

A City Ramble: or, the humours of the compter (sometimes The City Ramble) is a 1715 dramatic comedy play by the British writer Charles Knipe. It was first performed at Lincoln's-Inn Fields Theatre, London in 1715. It was performed as an afterpiece at times. It was revived at Covent Garden in 1736. Whincop says that it was "received with applause".

== Writer ==
Charles Knipe of Haughley, Suffolk, was educated at Trinity College, Cambridge. He married Ann Powel on April 30, 1719, at Selattyn, Shropshire. He was a justice of the peace in Bury St Edmunds, Suffolk.

== Plot ==
=== Act I ===
Scene I: A soliloquy from Twang, the turn-key who discusses honesty and conscience. There is a knock at the door and Strip, Skin'em and Bounce, his servants enter.

Scene II: The Constable and watchmen arrive at the compter (prison) having arrested two gentlemen for the murder of One-Eyed Dick. Toby Twang, the turn-key greets them and tells them they will have good lodgings.

Scene III: The Constable, the watchmen arrive at the compter with Justice Hardhead and a woman. Hardhead is drunk and begins to sing a song. Twang tells him to stop his noise to which Hardhead replies: "Sir, I have Eight Hundred pounds per annum, and will make a noise when I please."

Scene IV: The Constable and watchmen arrive with Ezekiel Prim who is drunk and a woman in a wheelbarrow. Twang exclaims: "What the devil have we here! a wheel barrow full of iniquity and a cloak full of Spiritual Pride; a pretty Couple Faith!" Prim pleads his innocence.

Scene V: The Constable and watchmen arrive with a Quaker and a woman who have been found in a Bawdy House.

Scene VI: Twang questions the woman who arrived with the Quaker and says: "What, come to a prison without money in your pocket? Pray how do you design to pay your fees and give me Half-a-Piece for your Civility?" She offers him her scarf and he says it's not worth much and that she'll have to pay with her petticoat and her hoop, but she objects saying: "I shan't be able to get six-pence if I loose my Hoop."

Scene VII: The constable and three watchmen arrive with Mordecai the Jew and his lady. Mordecai admits to 'whoring'. Twang is antisemitic in his views.

=== Act II ===
Scene I: The scene begins with a soliloquy given by Mordecai. Twang enters.

Scene II: Mordecai and Twang haggle over the costs of his imprisonment. Twang asks Mordecai to pay him ten shillings for tearing his black coat and six and eight pence for damaging his neck cloth.

Scene III: The two gentlemen discuss their accommodation. One of them says: "Rot their Lodgings, I was drunk enough to sleep anywhere, but I think the bed I lay in had no curtains." The watchmen accuse them of breaking their lanthorn. The gentlemen ask what happened to the dead man and one of the watchmen replies: "I am the man - and to be sure I thought I was dead, till my wife satisfyed me I had never a hole through my Body." Twang discusses his opinions on Physick and the Law and also how the previous night he had favoured a retailer of Penny-Custards over a Poet by giving him better accommodation because the retailer had more potential to become an influential man and be of use to him. The prisoners are all brought before Sir Humphry Halfwit, apart from Mordecai.

Scene IV: The scene changes to a room in Sir Humphry Halfwit's house. There is a table covered with sandwiches and a great chair for Sir Humphry. Justice Hardhead, Ezekiel Prim, Abraham (the Quaker), the four watchmen, and two men, their friends, Strip, Bounce and others are in attendance. Strip and Mordecai enter.

Scene V: Sir Humphry has not arrived as he is still eating his breakfast. Twang and the gentlemen discuss the other prisoners.

Scene VI: Sir Humphry Halfwit, his clerk and other attendants arrive. The two gentlemen pay their costs and are discharged. Justice Hardhead is next before Sir Humphry and belligerently complains that as someone who makes the laws he should be entitled to break them. Sir Humphry thinks he must still be drunk to say such things and tells Twang to take him away and let him sleep it off. The woman is discharged and told to pay her fees. The Quaker's wife, Rachel, arrives and says that her husband cannot have been taking comfort in the whorehouse as he "is a weak Friend and cannot as he ought, administer the comforts of Wedlock" even to his wife. She admits that she once found him "trespassing" with her hand maid but he had waxed "cool" since. Mordecai is brought before Sir Humphry for drunkenness and Sir Humphry assumes that he is guilty because he is a Jew and makes little effort to hear his plea. Prim is next, and Sir Humphry dismisses the evidence against the holy man. He asks the woman to pay her fees and be discharged.

The play reveals the anti-semitic and mysogenistic views of the period and how class influences the treatment of the prisoners regardless of their crimes.

== List of characters ==
- Sir Humphrey Halfwit
- Justice Hardhead
- Ezekiel Prim, a Presbyterian parson
- Abraham, a Quaker
- Mordecai, a French Jew
- Two Gentlemen, Constable and other attendants.
- Rachael, Abraham's Wife
- Twang, the Turn-Key
- Strip
- Skin'em
- Bounce

== Actors ==
The original Lincoln's-Inn Fields cast included:

- William Bullock. (Twang)
- Benjamin Griffin. (Ezekiel Prim)
- George Pack. (Abraham)
- Thomas Walker.
- Mr. Leigh.
- Mr. Churchman.
- Mr. Walker.
- Mrs. Stockdale.
- Mr Schoolding (Sir Humphry Halfwit)
- Mr Hall (Justice Hardhead)
- Mr Knap (Mordecai)
- Mrs Hunt (Rachael)

The revived cast at Covent Garden included:

- John Hippisley. (Justice Hardhead)
- Roger Bridgewater. (Ezekiel Prim)
- William Hallam
- Mr William Mullart (Sir Humphry Halfwit)
- Mr Neale (Abraham)
- Mr James (Mordecai)
- Mr Aston (first gentleman)
- Mr Ryan (second gentleman)
- Mr Charles Stoppelaer (Constable)
- Mrs Mullart (Rachael)
- Mr Bencroft (first woman of the town)
- Mr Hallam (second woman of the town)
- Mrs Browne (third woman of the town)
- Mr Smith (news woman)
- Mr Chapman (Toby Twang)
- Mr Clark (Strip)
- Mr Littleton (Skin'em)
- Mr Jones (Bounce)

== Bibliography ==
- Burling, William J. A Checklist of New Plays and Entertainments on the London Stage, 1700-1737. Fairleigh Dickinson Univ Press, 1992.
- Curll, E. Books printed for E.Curll.
- Dodsley, R. and J. Theatrical Records: or An Account of English Dramatic Authors, and their works page 105. 1756.
- Egerton, T. and J. The Theatrical Remembrancer page 150. 1788.
- Knipe, Charles. A City Ramble, or the Humours of the Compter. 1715.
- Nicoll, Allardyce. History of English Drama, 1660-1900, Volume 2. Cambridge University Press, 2009.
- Pemberton, J. A City Ramble, or the Humours of the Compter. As it is acted at the Theatre in Lincoln's-Inn Field. By Mr. Charles Knipe. 1715.
