= Philip of Macedon (play) =

1727 play

- Written by: David Lewis
- Original language: English
- Genre: Tragedy

Premiere
- Date premiered: 2 May 1727
- Place premiered: Lincoln's Inn Fields Theatre

Philip of Macedon is a 1727 tragedy by the British writer David Lewis. It is set during the reign of Philip of Macedon.

The original Lincoln's Inn Fields cast included Thomas Walker as Perses, Charles Hulett as Philip, Lacy Ryan as Demetrius, William Milward as Antigonus, John Ogden as Lysimachus, James Quin as Didas, James Lacy as Herodorus, John Berriman as Philocles, Robert Morgan as Xychus, Elizabeth Younger as Olympias and Anne Berriman as Isteria.

== Bibliography ==
- Burling, William J. A Checklist of New Plays and Entertainments on the London Stage, 1700-1737. Fairleigh Dickinson Univ Press, 1992.
- Nicoll, Allardyce. A History of Early Eighteenth Century Drama: 1700-1750. CUP Archive, 1927.
