= Frowde =

Frowde is a surname. Notable people with the surname include:

- Philip Frowde (died 1738), English poet and dramatist
- Henry Frowde
