= Periander (play) =

1731 play

- Original language: English
- Written by: John Tracy
- Genre: Tragedy

Premiere
- Date: 13 January 1731
- Place: Lincoln's Inn Fields Theatre

Periander is a 1731 tragedy by the British writer John Tracy. It is based on the life of Periander, the Ancient Greek ruler of Corinth.

The original cast included James Quin as Periander, Lacy Ryan as Procles, William Milward as Aristides, Thomas Chapman as Alcander, Thomas Walker as Hypsenor and John Ogden as Lycon.

== Bibliography ==
- Burling, William J. A Checklist of New Plays and Entertainments on the London Stage, 1700-1737. Fairleigh Dickinson Univ Press, 1992.
- Nicoll, Allardyce. History of English Drama, 1660-1900, Volume 2. Cambridge University Press, 2009.
