= Sir Walter Raleigh (play) =

1719 play

- Original language: English
- Written by: George Sewell
- Genre: Tragedy

Premiere
- Date: 16 January 1719
- Place: Lincoln's Inn Fields Theatre

Sir Walter Raleigh is a 1719 tragedy by the British writer George Sewell. It is based on the downfall of Walter Raleigh a successful courtier and sailor in the reign of Elizabeth I who was executed in the reign of her successor James I. It was originally staged at the Lincoln's Inn Fields Theatre, one of the two patent theatres operating in London.

The original cast featured James Quin as Walter Raleigh, Lacy Ryan as Howard, John Leigh as Young Raleigh, John Corey as Salisbury, Christopher Bullock as Gundamor, Thomas Smith as Sir Julius Caesar, John Egleton as Carew, John Ogden as Wade, Anna Maria Seymour as Lady Raleigh and Jane Rogers as Olympia.

== Bibliography ==
- Burling, William J. A Checklist of New Plays and Entertainments on the London Stage, 1700-1737. Fairleigh Dickinson Univ Press, 1992.
