= The Cobbler of Preston =

1716 play

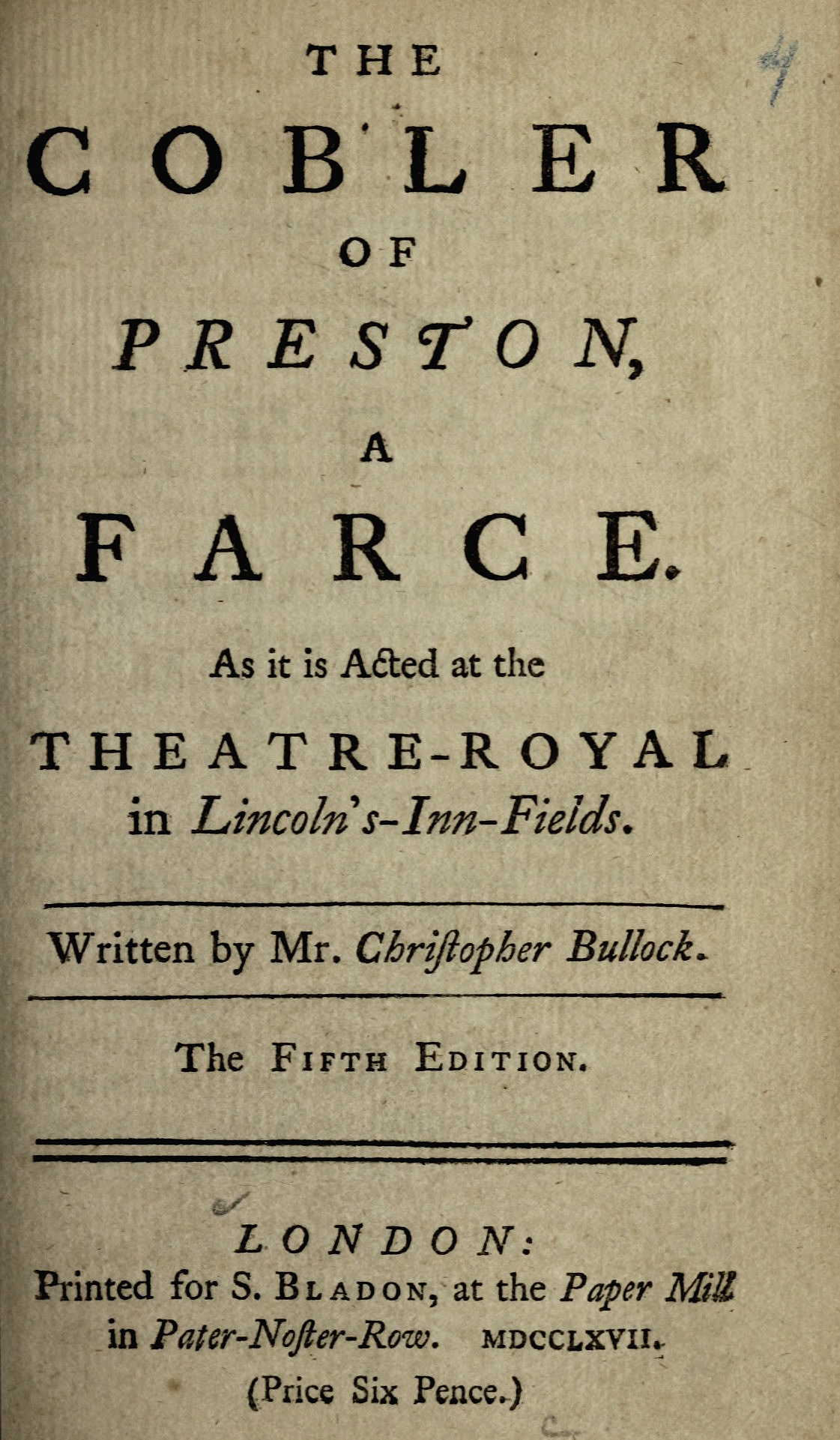
- Title page of the 5th edition (1767)
- Original language: English
- Written by: Christopher Bullock
- Genre: Comedy

Premiere
- Date: 24 January 1716
- Place: Lincoln's Inn Fields Theatre

The Cobbler of Preston (first published as The Cobler of Preston) is a 1716 comedy play by Christopher Bullock, although a separate play of the same title was written by Charles Johnson the same year. A one-act afterpiece is the origin of the phrase "Tis impossible to be sure of anything but Death and Taxes". In the preface to the published version Bullock suggested that he had begun writing the play just four days before its premiere. It takes inspiration from The Taming of the Shrew by William Shakespeare and is set in Preston, Lancashire. The town had recently been scene of fighting during the 1715 Jacobite Rebellion at the Battle of Preston. Bullock's play does not overtly reference the rebellion, but has undertones supportive of the Hanoverian Dynasty.

It first appeared at the Lincoln's Inn Fields Theatre as the afterpiece to a revival of The Confederacy by John Vanbrugh. The cast included John Ogden as Sir Jasper Manly, James Spiller as Toby Guzzle, Christopher Bullock as Snuffle and William Bullock as Grist and Benjamin Griffin as Dorcas Guzzle.

== Alternative version ==
On 3 February 1716 a separate version premiered at the rival Drury Lane Theatre, managed by Robert Wilks. A two act farcical afterpiece written by Charles Johnson it was more overtly political than Bullock's play and ultimately less successful. Johnson's piece is likely to have been written first, with Bullock hearing of its production and deciding to steal a march to get his own version performed first. The cast included Lacy Ryan as Sir Charles Briton, Thomas Walker as Captain Jolly, William Pinkethman as Sir Kit Sly, Elizabeth Willis as Joan and Mary Willis as Betty.

== Bibliography ==
- Burling, William J. A Checklist of New Plays and Entertainments on the London Stage, 1700-1737. Fairleigh Dickinson Univ Press, 1992.
- Nicoll, Allardyce. History of English Drama, 1660-1900, Volume 2. Cambridge University Press, 2009.
- Van Lennep, W. The London Stage, 1660-1800: Volume Two, 1700-1729. Southern Illinois University Press, 1960.
