= The Fatal Secret =

Play by Lewis Theobald

- Original language: English
- Written by: Lewis Theobald
- Genre: Tragedy

Premiere
- Date: 4 April 1733
- Place: Covent Garden Theatre

The Fatal Secret is a 1733 tragedy by the British writer Lewis Theobald. Its story was adapted from The Duchess of Malfi by John Webster.

The original Covent Garden cast included Lacy Ryan as Ferdinand, Thomas Walker as Cardinal of Aragon, William Milward as Antonio, Thomas Chapman as Marquise of Pescara, William Paget as Flavio, Walter Aston as Urbino James Quin as Bosola, Elizabeth Vincent as the Duke of Amalfi and Anne Hallam as the Duchess of Malfy. The prologue was written by Philip Frowde.

== See also ==
- The Duchess of Malfi

== Bibliography ==
- Burling, William J. A Checklist of New Plays and Entertainments on the London Stage, 1700-1737. Fairleigh Dickinson Univ Press, 1992.
- Nicoll, Allardyce. A History of Early Eighteenth Century Drama: 1700-1750. CUP Archive, 1927.
