= Anthony Boheme =

English actor

Anthony Boheme (died 1731) was a British stage actor of the eighteenth century.

His year of birth is unknown. From 1720 he was a long-standing part of John Rich's company at the Lincoln's Inn Fields Theatre until his death. He was married to the actress Anna Maria Seymour.

== Selected roles ==
- Lord Cobham in Sir Walter Raleigh (1719)
- French Bishop in Henry IV of France (1719)
- Jaspar in The Half-Pay Officers (1720)
- Aspar in The Imperial Captives (1720)
- Nicanor in Antiochus (1721)
- Haly in The Fair Captive (1721)
- Lord Gracebubble in The Chimera (1721)
- Courtney in Fatal Extravagance (1721)
- Weighty in The Compromise (1722)
- O'Brien in Hibernia Freed (1722)
- Danaus in Love and Duty (1722)
- Eteocles in The Fatal Legacy (1723)
- Herod in Mariamne (1723)
- Edwin in Edwin (1724)
- Paulinus in The Roman Maid (1724)
- Belisarius in Belisarius (1724)
- Wiseman in The Bath Unmasked (1725)
- Don Manuel in Money the Mistress (1726)
- Sicoris in The Fall of Saguntum (1727)
- Omar in Sesostris (1728)
- Phraotes in The Virgin Queen (1728)
- Plowdon in The Wife of Bath (1730)

== Bibliography ==
- Highfill, Philip H, Burnim, Kalman A. & Langhans, Edward A. A Biographical Dictionary of Actors, Actresses, Musicians, Dancers, Managers, and Other Stage Personnel in London, 1660–1800: Garrick to Gyngell. SIU Press, 1978.
- Straub, Kristina, G. Anderson, Misty and O'Quinn, Daniel . The Routledge Anthology of Restoration and Eighteenth-Century Drama. Taylor & Francis, 2017.
