= Money the Mistress =

1726 play

- Written by: Thomas Southerne
- Original language: English
- Genre: Comedy

Premiere
- Date premiered: 19 February 1726
- Place premiered: Lincoln's Inn Fields Theatre

Money the Mistress is a 1726 comedy play by the Irish writer Thomas Southerne. It was his final play.

Staged by John Rich at the Lincoln's Inn Fields Theatre, the cast included James Quin as Warcourt, Lacy Ryan as Mourville, Thomas Walker as Marsan, Richard Diggs as Governor of Tangier, William Milward as Wingrave, Anthony Boheme as Don Manuel, John Hippisley as Davila, Jane Rogers as Harriet and Elizabeth Younger as Mariana.

== Bibliography ==
- Burling, William J. A Checklist of New Plays and Entertainments on the London Stage, 1700-1737. Fairleigh Dickinson Univ Press, 1992.
