= The Married Philosopher =

Comedy play by the writer John Kelly

- Original language: English
- Written by: John Kelly
- Genre: Comedy

Premiere
- Date: 25 March 1732
- Place: Lincoln's Inn Fields Theatre

The Married Philosopher is a 1732 comedy play by the writer John Kelly. It was inspired by the 1727 play Le Philosophe Marié by the French writer Philippe Néricault Destouches.

The original Lincoln's Inn Fields cast included Lacy Ryan as Sir Harry Sprightly, Charles Hulett as Odway, James Quin as Old Bellefleur, William Milward as Young Bellefleur, Thomas Walker as Horatio, Thomas Chapman as Brush, Anne Hallam as Melissa and Elizabeth Younger as Violetta.

== Bibliography ==
- Burling, William J. A Checklist of New Plays and Entertainments on the London Stage, 1700-1737. Fairleigh Dickinson Univ Press, 1992.
- Nicoll, Allardyce. A History of Early Eighteenth Century Drama: 1700-1750. CUP Archive, 1927.
