= The Fall of Saguntum =

Play by Philip Frowde

- Original language: English
- Written by: Philip Frowde
- Genre: Tragedy

Premiere
- Date: 16 January 1727
- Place: Lincoln's Inn Fields Theatre

The Fall of Saguntum is a 1727 tragedy by the British writer Philip Frowde. The plot revolves around the Siege of Saguntum in the Second Punic War, and its fall the forces of the Carthaginian general Hannibal. Influenced by the style of John Addison's play Cato it was dedicated to Prime Minister Sir Robert Walpole.

Staged at Lincoln's Inn Fields the original cast included Anthony Boheme as Sicoris, Thomas Walker as Murrus, James Quin as Eurydamas, Charles Hulett as Theron, Richard Diggs as Lychormas, Lacy Ryan as Fabius, William Milward as Curtius, John Ogden as First Saguntium, Anne Berriman as Candace and Jane Rogers as Timandra. The prologue was written by Lewis Theobald.

== Bibliography ==
- Black, Jeremy. Culture in Eighteenth-Century England: A Subject for Taste. A&C Black, 2007.
- Burling, William J. A Checklist of New Plays and Entertainments on the London Stage, 1700-1737. Fairleigh Dickinson Univ Press, 1992.
- Loftis, John Cylde. The Politics of Drama in Augustan England. Clarendon Press, 1963.
