= Fatal Extravagance =

Play by Aaron Hill

- Written by: Aaron Hill
- Original language: English
- Genre: Tragedy

Premiere
- Date premiered: 21 April 1721
- Place premiered: Lincoln's Inn Fields Theatre

Fatal Extravagance is a 1721 tragedy by the British writer Aaron Hill. It was presented by another writer Joseph Mitchell, a friend of Hill, at the Lincoln's Inn Fields Theatre in London. The original cast included James Quin as Bellmour, Anthony Boheme as Courtney, John Ogden as Bargrave and Anna Maria Seymour as Louisa. It was printed with the slightly longer title The Fatal Extravagance.

Hill was inspired by the recent South Sea Bubble where speculative investment had led to a massive crash, ruining backers of the company. In the play this takes the former a out-of-control gambler who ends up killing a creditor and planning to commit suicide.

In 1793 a version of the play retitled The Prodigal by Francis Godolphin Waldron was staged at the Haymarket Theatre, with a happy ending added.

== Bibliography ==
- Burling, William J. A Checklist of New Plays and Entertainments on the London Stage, 1700-1737. Fairleigh Dickinson Univ Press, 1992.
- Gerrard, Christine. Aaron Hill: The Muses' Projector, 1685-1750. Oxford University Press, 2003.
