= The Female Fortune Teller =

Play by Charles Johnson

- Original language: English
- Written by: Charles Johnson
- Genre: Comedy

Premiere
- Date: 7 January 1726
- Place: Lincoln's Inn Fields Theatre

The Female Fortune Teller is a 1726 comedy play by the British writer Charles Johnson. It is a reworking of Edward Ravenscroft's 1683 restoration comedy Dame Dobson.

The original cast featured James Quin as Spring, Lacy Ryan as Ringwood, Thomas Walker as Sir Charles Mirmont, John Hippisley as Owen Apwigeon, Jane Egleton as Mrs Joiner, Henrietta Morgan as Frances, Anne Parker as Astrea and Elizabeth Younger as Scuttle.

== Bibliography ==
- Burling, William J. A Checklist of New Plays and Entertainments on the London Stage, 1700-1737. Fairleigh Dickinson Univ Press, 1992.
- Nicoll, Allardyce. History of English Drama, 1660-1900, Volume 2. Cambridge University Press, 2009.
