= The Capricious Lovers =

Play by Gabriel Odingsells

- Original language: English
- Written by: Gabriel Odingsells
- Genre: Comedy

Premiere
- Date: 8 December 1725
- Place: Lincoln's Inn Fields Theatre

The Capricious Lovers is a 1725 comedy play by the British writer Gabriel Odingsells. The play revolves around a vain militia colonel.

The original cast at Lincoln's Inn Fields included John Hippisley as Colonel Mockyouth, Thomas Walker as Beaumine, Lacy Ryan as Galliard, William Bullock as Roger, James Spiller as Trusty, Elizabeth Younger as Graciana, Anne Parker as Mrs Fading, Jane Rogers as Mrs Mincemode and Jane Egleton as Frizle.

== Bibliography ==
- Burling, William J. A Checklist of New Plays and Entertainments on the London Stage, 1700-1737. Fairleigh Dickinson Univ Press, 1992.
- Freeman, Terence M. Dramatic Representations of British Soldiers and Sailors on the London Stage, 1660-1880: Britons, Strike Home. Mellen Press, 1995.
- Nicoll, Allardyce. A History of Early Eighteenth Century Drama: 1700-1750. CUP Archive, 1927.
