= The Virgin Queen (play) =

1728 play

- Original language: English
- Written by: Richard Barford
- Genre: Tragedy

Premiere
- Date: 7 December 1728
- Place: Lincoln's Inn Fields Theatre

The Virgin Queen is a 1728 tragedy by the British writer Richard Barford.

The original cast featured Lacy Ryan as Pallantus, James Quin as Artaxerses, William Milward as Eumenes, Anthony Boheme as Phraotes, Thomas Chapman as Mirza, Thomas Walker as Arsamnes and Elizabeth Younger as Artesia.

== Bibliography ==
- Burling, William J. A Checklist of New Plays and Entertainments on the London Stage, 1700-1737. Fairleigh Dickinson Univ Press, 1992.
- Nicoll, Allardyce. History of English Drama, 1660-1900, Volume 2. Cambridge University Press, 2009.
