= The City Ramble =

Play by Elkanah Settle

- Original language: English
- Written by: Elkanah Settle
- Genre: Comedy

Premiere
- Date: 17 August 1711
- Place: Theatre Royal, Drury Lane, London

The City Ramble is a 1711 comedy play by the British writer Elkanah Settle. It should not be confused with the 1715 play A City Ramble.

The original Drury Lane cast included Barton Booth as Rinaldo, Henry Norris as Count, John Mills as Carlo, William Bullock as Don Garcia, Benjamin Johnson as Common Councilman, Christopher Bullock as Chevalier, Thomas Elrington as Valerio, George Pack as Antonio, Lacy Ryan as Young Gentleman, Lucretia Bradshaw as Viola, Jane Rogers as Lucia, Elizabeth Willis as Old Woman and Frances Maria Knight as Common Councilman's wife.

== Bibliography ==
- Burling, William J. A Checklist of New Plays and Entertainments on the London Stage, 1700-1737. Fairleigh Dickinson Univ Press, 1992.
- Nicoll, Allardyce. History of English Drama, 1660-1900, Volume 2. Cambridge University Press, 2009.
