= Orestes (Theobald play) =

1731 play

- Original language: English
- Written by: Lewis Theobald
- Genre: Tragedy

Premiere
- Date: 3 April 1731
- Place: Lincoln's Inn Fields Theatre

Orestes is a 1731 tragedy with musical elements by the British writer Lewis Theobald, based on the Ancient Greek story of Orestes.

The original Lincoln's Inn Fields cast included James Quin as Thoas, Lacy Ryan as Orestes, Thomas Walker as Pylades, Thomas Chapman as Barzanes and William Milward as Araxes, Charles Hulett as Magician, William Pinkethman and John Hippisley as sailors, Elizabeth Younger as Hermione, Anne Berriman as Circe, and Elizabeth Mills as Laodice. The epilogue was written by Henry Fielding. It was dedicated to the prime minister Sir Robert Walpole.

== Bibliography ==
- Baines, Paul & Ferarro, Julian & Rogers, Pat. The Wiley-Blackwell Encyclopedia of Eighteenth-Century Writers and Writing, 1660-1789. Wiley-Blackwell, 2011.
- Burling, William J. A Checklist of New Plays and Entertainments on the London Stage, 1700-1737. Fairleigh Dickinson Univ Press, 1992.
- Cleary, Thomas R. Henry Fielding: A Political Writer. Wilfrid Laurier Univ. Press, 2006.
