= Jane Egleton =

British actress

Jane Egleton (died 1734) was a British stage actress of the eighteenth century associated with John Rich's company at the Lincoln's Inn Fields Theatre.

Her origins are not entirely clear, but she acted under the name Jane Giffard or Mrs Giffard until 1721 when she married John Egleton. She may either have been previously married to one of the members of the Giffard acting clan or been born into the family herself. In 1728 she was the original Lucy Lockit in John Gay's The Beggar's Opera. She continued to act with Rich's company at Lincoln's Inn until 1732 and then remained for the first year after the switch to the new Covent Garden Theatre before retiring. In addition, she wrote a ballad-opera, The Maggot, which was produced at Lincoln's Inn Fields on 18 April, 1731.

== Selected roles ==
- Bettrice in The Lady's Triumph (1718)
- Le Jupe in The Coquet (1718)
- Lucy in 'Tis Well if it Takes (1719)
- Lady Raleigh in Sir Walter Raleigh (1720)
- Iris in Love and Duty (1722)
- Mother Stubble in Hanging and Marriage (1722)
- Salome in Mariamne (1723)
- Alice Lovemore in The Devil of a Wife (1724)
- Frizle in The Capricious Lovers (1725)
- Lady Amsbace in The Bath Unmasked (1725)
- Lettice in The Dissembled Wanton (1725)
- Mrs Joiner in The Female Fortune Teller (1726)
- Lucy Lockit in The Beggar's Opera (1728)
- Wife of Bath in The Wife of Bath (1730)

== Bibliography ==
- Highfill, Philip H, Burnim, Kalman A. & Langhans, Edward A. A Biographical Dictionary of Actors, Actresses, Musicians, Dancers, Managers, and Other Stage Personnel in London, 1660–1800: Garrick to Gyngell. SIU Press, 1978.
- Mann, David (1996). Women Playwrights in England, Ireland, and Scotland, 1660–1823. Bloomington: Indiana University Press. ISBN 0-253-33087-4.
- Straub, Kristina, G. Anderson, Misty and O'Quinn, Daniel . The Routledge Anthology of Restoration and Eighteenth-Century Drama. Taylor & Francis, 2017.
