= 'Tis Well if it Takes =

Play by William Taverner

- Original language: English
- Written by: William Taverner
- Genre: Comedy

Premiere
- Date: 28 February 1719
- Place: Lincoln's Inn Fields Theatre

'Tis Well if it Takes is a 1719 comedy play by the British writer William Taverner.

It premiered at Lincoln's Inn Fields on 28 February 1719. The original cast included John Leigh as Loveless, William Bullock as Oldish, Lacy Ryan as Charles, James Quin as Careful, James Spiller as Prate, Robert Pack as Easy, Jane Rogers as Corinna, Frances Maria Knight as Wishit, Mary Willis as Isabella, Elizabeth Spiller as Beatrice and Jane Egleton as Lucy. Lewis Theobald wrote the lyrics for a song performed in the Third Act. It ran for five nights, a reasonable length for a new comedy in the era.

== Bibliography ==
- Burling, William J. A Checklist of New Plays and Entertainments on the London Stage, 1700-1737. Fairleigh Dickinson Univ Press, 1992.
- Nicoll, Allardyce. A History of Early Eighteenth Century Drama: 1700-1750. CUP Archive, 1927.
