= The Wife of Bath (play) =

1713 play

- Original language: English
- Written by: John Gay
- Genre: Comedy

Premiere
- Date: 12 May 1713
- Place: Theatre Royal, Drury Lane

The Wife of Bath is a 1713 comedy play by the British writer John Gay. It was inspired by The Wife of Bath's Tale by Geoffrey Chaucer. The play marked a conscious switch by Gay towards an apolitical and distant past, after his contemporary work The Mohocks had faced controversy and censorship the previous year. Robert Wilks, a celebrated actor and manager of the Drury Lane Theatre, appeared as Chaucer. The title role of the wife was played by Margaret Bicknell with Mary Porter as Myrtilla and the cast rounded out by William Bullock, Lacy Ryan, Christopher Bullock, William Pinkethman, Susanna Mountfort and Henry Norris.

It had been expected to premiere in April 1713, but was delayed by the lengthy run of Joseph Addison's Cato which had been widely acclaimed. When it was finally able to be staged, it lasted for only two nights. However a publisher Bernard Lintot paid £25 for the copyright to the work, while Richard Steele had been enthusiastic after seeing it in rehearsals. The epilogue was likely to have been written by Gay's friend and fellow Tory Alexander Pope.

On 19 January 1730 the play, substantially rewritten by Gay who was now celebrated for his The Beggar's Opera, opened at the Lincoln's Inn Fields Theatre. The cast featured John Hippisley and Jane Egleton, who has both appeared in The Beggar's Opera. Other cast members included Thomas Chapman, Anthony Boheme, William Milward, Charles Hulett and Elizabeth Younger. It ran for three nights and this time Lintot paid £75 for the copyright to print it for sale. However, the play was never revived.

== Bibliography ==
- Burling, William J. A Checklist of New Plays and Entertainments on the London Stage, 1700–1737. Fairleigh Dickinson Univ Press, 1992.
- Winton, Calhoun. John Gay and the London Theatre. University Press of Kentucky, 2014.
