= Sesostris (play) =

1728 play

- Written by: John Sturmy
- Original language: English
- Genre: Tragedy

Premiere
- Date premiered: 17 January 1728
- Place premiered: Lincoln's Inn Fields Theatre

Sesostris is a 1728 tragedy by the British writer John Sturmy. It is based on the life of the Ancient Egyptian ruler Sesostris.

The original Lincoln's Inn Fields cast included Anthony Boheme as Omar, Lacy Ryan as Sesostris, William Milward as Phanes and Thomas Chapman as Dion, John Ogden as Ammon, Anne Berriman as Nitocris and Elizabeth Younger as Ariaspe.

== Bibliography ==
- Burling, William J. A Checklist of New Plays and Entertainments on the London Stage, 1700-1737. Fairleigh Dickinson Univ Press, 1992.
