= The Fatal Legacy =

1723 play by Jane Robe

- Original language: English
- Written by: Jane Robe
- Genre: Tragedy

Premiere
- Date: 23 April 1723
- Place: Lincoln's Inn Fields Theatre

The Fatal Legacy is a 1723 tragedy by the British writer Jane Robe. It was inspired by Jean Racine's 1664 play La Thébaïde. It concerns the children of Oedipus in Ancient Thebes.

The original Lincoln's Inn Fields cast included Anthony Boheme as Eteocles, Lacy Ryan as Polynices, James Quin as Creon, Thomas Walker as Phocias, Thomas Smith as Alcander, John Egleton as Attalus, Anna Maria Seymour as Jocasta and Jane Rogers as Antigona. The prologue was written by Charles Beckingham.

== Bibliography ==
- Burling, William J. A Checklist of New Plays and Entertainments on the London Stage, 1700-1737. Fairleigh Dickinson Univ Press, 1992.
- Nicoll, Allardyce. A History of Early Eighteenth Century Drama: 1700-1750. CUP Archive, 1927.
- Staves, Susan. A Literary History of Women's Writing in Britain, 1660–1789. Cambridge University Press, 2006.
