= Belisarius (play) =

Play by William Phillips

- Written by: William Phillips
- Original language: English
- Genre: Tragedy

Premiere
- Date premiered: 14 April 1724
- Place premiered: Lincoln's Inn Fields Theatre

Belisarius is a 1724 tragedy by the British writer William Phillips. It is based on the life of the Byzantine general Belisarius, sometimes dubbed the "Last of the Romans".

The original Lincoln's Inn Fields cast included Anthony Boheme as Belisarius, Lacy Ryan as Justinian I, Richard Diggs as Vitiges, Thomas Walker as Proclus, James Quin as Hermogenes, John Egleton as Macro, Anne Brett as Almira and Anne Parker as Valeria.

== Bibliography ==
- Burling, William J. A Checklist of New Plays and Entertainments on the London Stage, 1700-1737. Fairleigh Dickinson Univ Press, 1992.
- Nicoll, Allardyce. A History of Early Eighteenth Century Drama: 1700-1750. CUP Archive, 1927.
