= Themistocles (play) =

1729 play

- Original language: English
- Written by: Samuel Madden
- Genre: Tragedy

Premiere
- Date: 10 February 1729
- Place: Lincoln's Inn Fields Theatre

Themistocles, the Lover of His Country is a 1729 tragedy by the Irish writer Samuel Madden. It is based on the life of the Ancient Greek general Themistocles.

The original Lincoln's Inn Fields cast included James Quin as Themistocles, Thomas Walker as Xerxes I, Thomas Chapman as Artaban, William Milward as Mardonius, Lacy Ryan as Aristides, John Ogden as Demaratus, Anne Berriman as Artemisia and Elizabeth Buchanan as Nesiptolema.

== Bibliography ==
- Burling, William J. A Checklist of New Plays and Entertainments on the London Stage, 1700-1737. Fairleigh Dickinson Univ Press, 1992.
- Nicoll, Allardyce. A History of Early Eighteenth Century Drama: 1700-1750. CUP Archive, 1927.
