= The Cruel Gift =

1716 play

The Cruel Gift: A Tragedy is a tragedy (with an unusual happy ending) written by Susanna Centlivre, first performed at Drury Lane in 1716 (and published in 1717). Nicholas Rowe wrote the play's epilogue.

The story of Ghismunda and Guiscardo in The Decameron (retold by John Dryden as the poem Sigismonda and Guiscardo (1700)) was an influence on Centlivre's play.

== Plot ==
The King of Lombardy has a daughter, Leonora, who has secretly married Lorenzo, the King's General. As the King is extremely possessive of his daughter, he is furious when he discovers that she has married below her social station. Lorenzo is imprisoned, but he is popular among the citizens and they start to arm themselves, calling for his freedom.

The King orders that Lorenzo's heart be ripped out and sent to Leonora (the 'cruel gift'). Antenor (the King's Prime Minister) orders his son Learchus to carry out the deed. Leonora takes the initial news of Lorenzo's death calmly, but breaks down when Learchus presents her with the cup supposedly containing his heart. She curses her father, and tries to kill herself.

The King is shocked to learn that Lorenzo was in fact the son of the Duke of Milan, and therefore suitable husband-material for Leonora. He pleads with Leonora to carry on living, but she vows to kill herself. The King bitterly repents his actions.

Near the end of the play, a very much alive Lorenzo is reunited with Leonora. It turns out that Learchus had arranged for a substitute heart to be sent to her, hoping that her grief would soften her father's heart. Learchus is rewarded by being allowed to marry his own love, Antimora. The play closes with news that the rioting citizens laid down their arms after hearing that Lorenzo was in fact alive, but that the villainous Antenor was killed in the fighting.

== Reception ==
The Cruel Gift ran for six nights at Drury Lane in 1716. The cast included John Mills as the King of Lombardy, John Bowman as the Duke of Milan, Anne Oldfield as Leonora, Mary Porter as Antimora, Barton Booth as Lorenzo, James Quin as Antenor, Lacy Ryan as Learchus, Thomas Walker as Cardono and Robert Wilks as Agonistus.

Frederick Locke considers that 'the play contains Mrs. Centlivre's best verse, and is her most successfully sustained attempt at a serious drama'.

Eleni Siatra writes that in The Cruel Gift 'the concept of love is not utterly idealized, but instead invested in reality. Leonora and Lorenzo have to work hard to preserve the sanctity of their union. ... In this regard, Centlivre has a modernist, almost contemporary understanding of the complex interactions and problems faced by married couples. Leonora and Lorenzo are very real characters'.
