= Elmerick =

Play by George Lillo

- Original language: English
- Written by: George Lillo
- Genre: Tragedy

Premiere
- Date: 23 February 1740
- Place: Theatre Royal, Drury Lane

Elmerick, or Justice Triumphant is a 1740 tragedy by the British writer George Lillo. It was performed posthumously following his death the year before. It portrays the assassination of Gertrude of Merania, the consort of Andrew II of Hungary, and the play is part of the so-called Bánk bán tradition.

The original Drury Lane cast included William Mills as Andrew II, William Milward as Conrade, James Quin as Elmerick, Richard Winstone as Belus and Thomas Wright as Bathori. The prologue was written by James Hammond.

== Bibliography ==
- Baines, Paul & Ferarro, Julian & Rogers, Pat. The Wiley-Blackwell Encyclopedia of Eighteenth-Century Writers and Writing, 1660-1789. Wiley-Blackwell, 2011.
- Bevis, Richard W. English Drama: Restoration and Eighteenth Century 1660-1789. Routledge, 2014.
