= Marry, or Do Worse =

- Written by: William Walker
- Original language: English
- Genre: Comedy

Premiere
- Date premiered: October 1703
- Place premiered: Lincoln's Inn Fields Theatre, London

Marry, or Do Worse is a 1703 comedy play by William Walker.

It premiered at the Lincoln's Inn Fields Theatre in London. The original cast is not known.

== Bibliography ==
- Burling, William J. A Checklist of New Plays and Entertainments on the London Stage, 1700-1737. Fairleigh Dickinson Univ Press, 1992.
- Nicoll, Allardyce. History of English Drama, 1660-1900, Volume 2. Cambridge University Press, 2009.
