= Frederick, Duke of Brunswick-Lunenburgh =

Play by Eliza Haywood

- Written by: Eliza Haywood
- Original language: English
- Genre: Tragedy

Premiere
- Date premiered: 14 March 1729
- Place premiered: Lincoln's Inn Fields Theatre

Frederick, Duke of Brunswick-Lunenburgh is a 1729 historical tragedy by the British writer Eliza Haywood. It is based on the life of medieval ruler Frederick I, Duke of Brunswick-Wolfenbüttel.

Haywood, well-known for her novels, had previously written a comedy A Wife to be Lett in 1723, but in the wake of the theatrical boom following the success of The Beggar's Opera, she produced a second play. Haywood wrote the play in roughly four weeks, and dedicated it to Frederick, Prince of Wales who had recently arrived in Britain from the country from Hanover. It was an effort to secure patronage from the royal family, based on the life of their Guelph ancestor, and was intended to coincide with the celebrations of Queen Caroline's birthday. However it was not a success, lasting for only three nights, something Haywood partly attributed to its lack of royal backing.

The original cast included Thomas Walker as Frederick, Lacy Ryan as Duke of Wirtemberg, Thomas Chapman as Ridolpho, James Quin as Count Waldec, William Milward as Anspach, Henrietta Morgan as Sophia, Elizabeth Buchanan as Anna and Anne Berriman as Adelaid.

== Bibliography ==
- Burling, William J. A Checklist of New Plays and Entertainments on the London Stage, 1700-1737. Fairleigh Dickinson Univ Press, 1992.
- King, Kathryn R. A Political Biography of Eliza Haywood. Routledge, 2015.
- Rubik, Margarete. Early Women Dramatists 1550–1801. Macmillan, 2016.
