= Kensington Gardens (play) =

1719 play

- Written by: John Leigh
- Original language: English
- Genre: Comedy

Premiere
- Date premiered: 26 November 1719
- Place premiered: Lincoln's Inn Fields Theatre

Kensington Gardens is a 1719 comedy play by the Irish actor John Leigh. It is also known as Kensington Gardens, or, The Pretenders. It follows the attempts of several suitors to woo a wealthy rich widow, and the serious of complications that ensue.

Leigh himself played the role of Lord George Belmour, with Lacy Ryan as Colonel Lovely, George Pack as Sir Vanity Halfwit, William Bullock as Sir Politick Noodle, James Spiller as Captain Hackit, Christopher Bullock as Bardach, John Harper as Grogram John Egleton as Varnish and Elizabeth Spiller as Melissa.

The production at the Lincoln's Inn Fields Theatre lasted for estimated seven performances. The play is dedicated to Lord Brooke, a patron of the theatre.

== Bibliography ==
- Burling, William J. A Checklist of New Plays and Entertainments on the London Stage, 1700-1737. Fairleigh Dickinson Univ Press, 1992.
- Nicoll, Allardyce. A History of Early Eighteenth Century Drama: 1700-1750. CUP Archive, 1927.
