= Thomas Walker (actor) =

English actor and dramatist

Thomas Walker (1698–1744) was an English actor and dramatist.

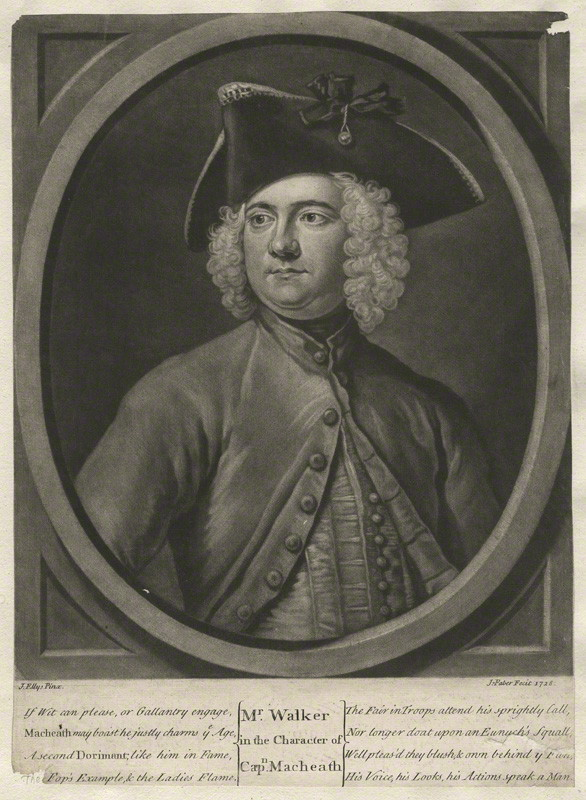
Thomas Walker, 1728 engraving as Captain Macheath

== Early life ==
He was the son of Francis Walker of Soho, London. At around the year 1714, he joined the Shepherd's company (perhaps the Shepherd who was at William Pinkethman's theatre in Greenwich in 1710). Barton Booth saw Walker in a droll, The Siege of Troy, and recommended him to the management of the Drury Lane Theatre.

== Actor ==
In November 1715 Walker seems to have played Tyrrel in Colley Cibber's Richard III; on 12 December 1715 he was Young Fashion in a revival of The Relapse (John Vanburgh). On 23 September 1721 he appeared at Lincoln's Inn Fields as Edmund in King Lear, and he remained there until 1733. On 29 January 1728 Walker took on his major original part, Captain Macheath in the Beggar's Opera, and his reputation was established.

On 10 February 1733, at the new Covent Garden Theatre, Walker was the first Periphas in John Gay's Achilles. The last part in which he is mentioned at Covent Garden is Ambrosio in Don Quixote, which he played on 17 May 1739. In 1739–40 he seems to have been resting, but he played, 17 May 1740, Macheath for his benefit at Drury Lane. In 1740–41 he was seen in many of his major parts at Goodman's Fields Theatre. But after David Garrick's arrival at Goodman's Fields in 1741, Walker's name was taken from the bills and did not reappear until 27 May 1742, when the Beggar's Opera and the Virgin Unmasked (Henry Fielding) were given for his benefit. He seems to have played in Dublin in 1742 as Kite in The Recruiting Officer, with Garrick as Plume.

In the period 1739–42 Thomas was associated with a para-masonic group of male and female theatre folk calling itself the Modern Masons that met at Silvester's Gardens in Clerkenwell. This was one of several groups unsympathetic to the Ministry of Prime Minister Robert Walpole that made works in support of the anti-Walpole Patriot Opposition, a.k.a. the Patriot Party.

Walker's best serious parts were thought to be Bajazet, Hotspur, Edmund, and Falconbridge; in comedy he was best received as Worthy in the Recruiting Officer, Bellmour in the Old Bachelor, and Harcourt in The Country Girl (Garrick, after Wycherley).

== Dramatist ==
Walker's first dramatic effort was to compressing into one play the two parts of Thomas D'Urfey's Massaniello. This work was produced at Lincoln's Inn Fields, 31 July 1724, with Walker as Massaniello. The Quaker's Opera, 1728, an imitation by Walker of the Beggar's Opera, was acted at Lee and Harper's booth in Bartholomew Fair. The Fate of Villainy, 1730, was given at Goodman's Fields Theatre on 24 February 1730 by Henry Giffard and Mrs. Giffard.

== Death ==
In 1744 Walker went to Dublin, taking with him the Fate of Villainy, which was acted there under the title of Love and Loyalty. The second night was to have been for his benefit. Not being able to furnish security for the expenses of the house, he could not induce the managers to reproduce it. He died three days later, 5 June 1744.

== Selected roles ==
- Cardono in The Cruel Gift by Susanna Centlivre (1716)
- Captain Jolly in The Cobbler of Preston by Charles Johnson (1716)
- Charles in The Non-Juror by Colley Cibber (1717)
- Captain Carbine in The Play is the Plot by John Durant Breval (1718)
- Rameses in Busiris, King of Egypt by Edward Young (1719)
- Brutus in The Invader of His Country by John Dennis (1719)
- Daran in The Siege of Damascus by John Hughes (1720)
- Charles Despotick in The Compromise by John Sturmy (1722)
- Pheroras in Mariamne by Elijah Fenton (1723)
- Phocias in The Fatal Legacy by Jane Robe (1723)
- Galerius Caesar in The Roman Maid by Robert Hurst (1724)
- Proclus in Belisarius by William Phillips (1724)
- Albert in Edwin by George Jeffreys (1724)
- Frippou in The Bath Unmasked by Gabriel Odingsells (1725)
- Beaumine in The Capricious Lovers by Gabriel Odingsells (1725)
- Beaufort in The Dissembled Wanton by Leonard Welsted (1726)
- Sir Charles Mirmont in The Female Fortune Teller (1726)
- Marsan in Money the Mistress by Thomas Southerne (1726)
- Murrus in The Fall of Saguntum by Philip Frowde (1727)
- Perses in Philip of Macedon by David Lewis (1727)
- Captain Macheath in The Beggar's Opera by John Gay (1728)
- Arsamnes in The Virgin Queen by Richard Barford (1728)
- Frederick in Frederick, Duke of Brunswick-Lunenburgh by Eliza Haywood (1729)
- Xerses in Themistocles by Samuel Madden (1729)
- Hypsenor in Periander by John Tracy (1731)
- Pylades in Orestes by Lewis Theobald (1731)
- Cassander in Philotas by Philip Frowde (1731)
- Adrastus in Merope by George Jeffreys (1731)
- Horatio in The Married Philosopher by John Kelly (1732)
- Porsenna in The Tuscan Treaty by William Bond (1733)
- Cardinal of Aragon in The Fatal Secret by Lewis Theobald (1733)
- Heartly in The Lady's Revenge by William Popple (1734)
- Young Courtlove in The Double Deceit by William Popple (1735)

== Notes ==
Attribution

This article incorporates text from a publication now in the public domain: Lee, Sidney, ed. (1899). "Walker, Thomas (1698-1744)". Dictionary of National Biography. Vol. 59. London: Smith, Elder & Co.
