= Thomas Murray (artist) =

Scottish painter

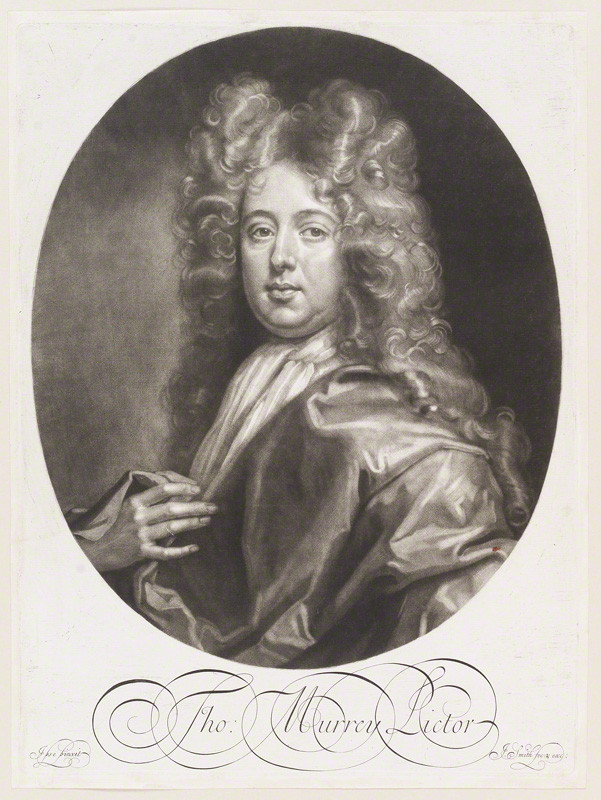
- Engraving by John Smith after a self-portrait by Murray
- Born: 1663
- Died: June 1734 (aged 70–71)

Thomas Murray (1663 – June 1734) was a Scottish painter who specialised in portrait painting.

== Life ==
Thomas Murray received his first lessons in art from one of the De Critz family. Subsequently, he became a pupil of John Riley; like his master, Murray was just a face-painter, leaving the rest of the picture to be completed by others.

Murray was successful financially. He died in June 1734, leaving no children, and bequeathed his money to a nephew, with instructions that his monument, with a bust, should be erected in Westminster Abbey, provided that it did not cost too much. His nephew, however, taking him at his word, buried him in St. Paul's, Covent Garden, and found the monument too expensive to erect.

== Works ==
Murray contributed a self-portrait to the Uffizi Gallery, Florence, on a visit to Italy in 1708. Like many of his portraits, it was engraved.

Among his sitters were:

- King William and Queen Mary (hung in Fishmongers' Hall, London), and Queen Anne (full length, seated, hung in the town hall at Stratford-upon-Avon);
- Prince George of Hesse-Darmstadt;
- Bishops John Buckeridge and Edmund Gibson;
- Christopher Monck, 2nd Duke of Albemarle (an early work) and Henry St John, Viscount Bolingbroke;
- William Dampier, Sir John Pratt, Sir Hans Sloane (hung at the Royal College of Physicians), Edmund Halley (hung at the Royal Society), Philip Frowde, and others.
