= Edwin (play) =

Play by George Jeffreys

- Written by: George Jeffreys
- Original language: English
- Genre: Tragedy

Premiere
- Date premiered: 24 February 1724
- Place premiered: Lincoln's Inn Fields Theatre

Edwin is a 1724 tragedy by the British writer George Jeffreys.

The original cast included Anthony Boheme as Edwin, Lacy Ryan as Leolin, Charles Hulett as Tudor, Thomas Walker as Albert, James Quin as Gomel, Richard Diggs as Morvid and Anne Parker as Adeliza.

== Bibliography ==
- Burling, William J. A Checklist of New Plays and Entertainments on the London Stage, 1700-1737. Fairleigh Dickinson Univ Press, 1992.
- Nicoll, Allardyce. A History of Early Eighteenth Century Drama: 1700-1750. CUP Archive, 1927.
