= The Nobleman =

1736 play

- Original language: English
- Written by: Elizabeth Cooper
- Genre: Comedy

Premiere
- Date: 17 May 1736
- Place: Haymarket Theatre

The Nobleman is a 1736 comedy play by Elizabeth Cooper. It premiered at the Haymarket Theatre, and is also known by the longer title The Nobleman, or, The Family Quarrel.

== Bibliography ==
- Burling, William J. A Checklist of New Plays and Entertainments on the London Stage, 1700-1737. Fairleigh Dickinson Univ Press, 1992.
- Nicoll, Allardyce. A History of Early Eighteenth Century Drama: 1700-1750. CUP Archive, 1927.
