= The Rival Widows =

18th-century comedic play

- Original language: English
- Written by: Elizabeth Cooper
- Genre: Comedy

Premiere
- Date: 22 February 1735
- Place: Covent Garden Theatre

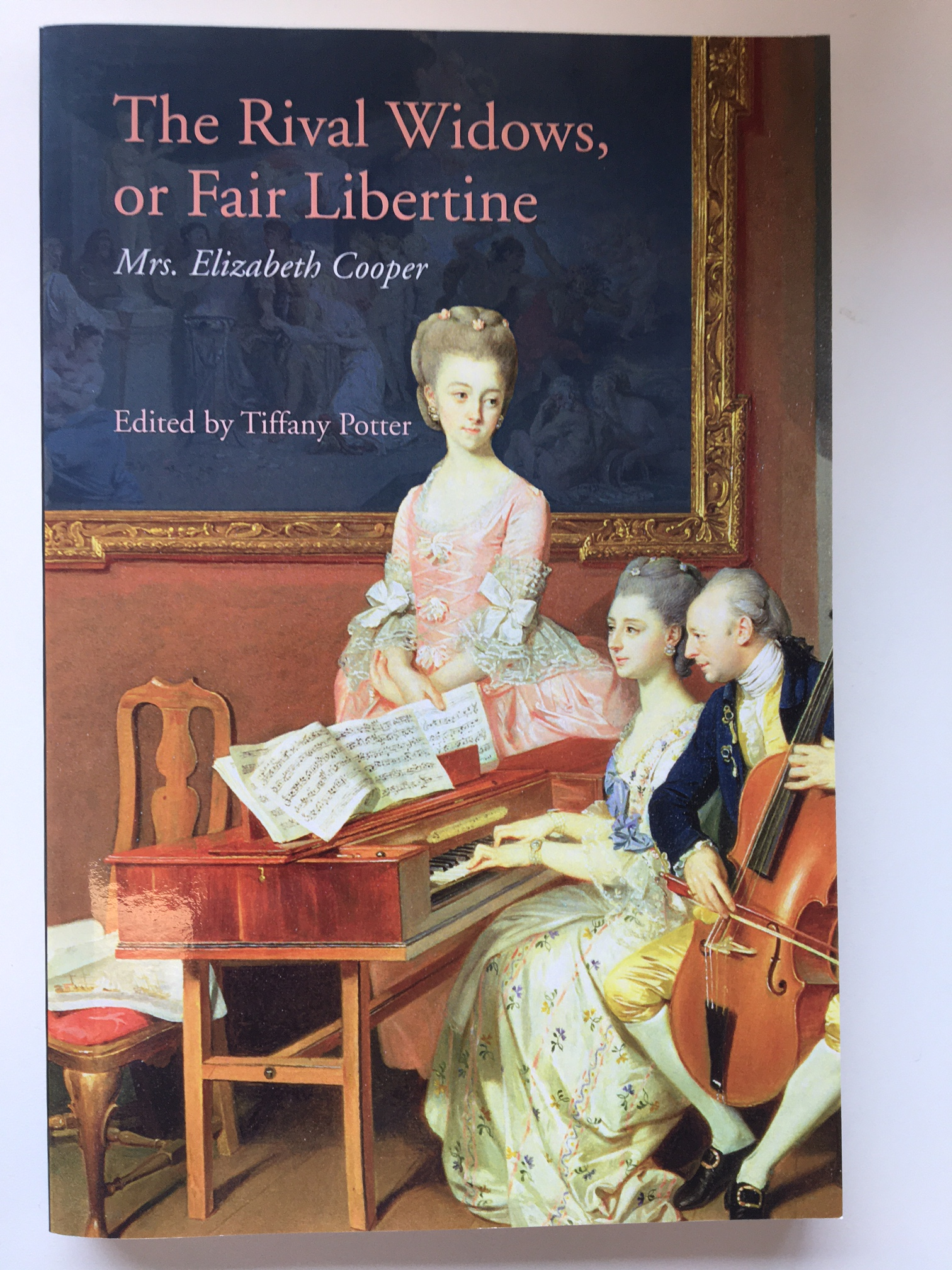
Elizabeth Cooper's The Rival Widows, or Fair Libertine. University of Toronto Press, 2013. Edited by Tiffany Potter.

The Rival Widows, or the Fair Libertine is a 1735 comedy play by the British writer Elizabeth Cooper. The plot is a re-gendered mashup of two popular eighteenth-century genres: the libertine comedy (in the tradition of William Wycherley and George Farquhar) and the comedy of sentiment (man-of-feeling plays in the tradition of Colley Cibber and Sir Richard Steele). The beautiful and brilliant libertine widow Lady Bellair battles the hypocritical friend and rival Lady Lurcher for the attentions of man of feeling Freelove. Bellair loves Freelove, but is exasperated by his rhetoric of feeling and his lack of interest in using witty exchanges or clever plotting to try to seduce her and win her love. In response, she creates various strategems to essentially manipulate him into tricking her into agreeing never to love him, knowing that she will desperately want anything that is forbidden to her. Her character is well summarized early in the play with her own comment that "my pleasures are my principles" and Freelove's summary of her character: "she has wit enough to supply the present dearth of it on the stage, and good nature to make that wit agreeable, even at court. In short, she's gay without levity, libertine without scandal, generous without design, and well-bred without affectation" (1.6). Her comments on marriage convey her recognition that power is at the core of all pleasure for a libertine:

"why would you exchange all these pretty things for a husband? Men only buy their slaves, but women their masters: --and I hate fetters, though of gold ... I had rather have twenty lovers, than be troubled with another [husband] for all that; there's some joy in having the man you doat on for your slave, but none for your Lord; I can now dispose of my frowns and smiles like an absolute Princess, to whom I please; can humble, exalt, undo, create again, to keep my subjects in obedience and exercise my power ... Tis always my way to strip Nature stark naked and view her without the disguise of custom and Hypocrisy--I think freely and speak openly, and the same honest frankness that obliges me to speak what I think, will oblige me to think what is right" (2.2).

Young Modern provides a point of comic ridiculousness as would-be rival for Lady Bellair's affections and victim of her witty performances of power. When Young Modern seeks to seduce Bellair, she replies that she cannot risk her reputation: if she is to agree to sleep with him, he must change the world's opinion of him from extravagant libertine of the old Restoration model to a puritan-style man of religious respectability. While Young Modern believes he is terribly witty and edgy in his role playing, he is rendered ridiculous in his failures, most clearly in his not-quite-correct clothing choices and in the fact that when he purchases the "godly library" that Lady Bellair demands, every book is wrong. At the end of the play, Young Modern is about to be disowned by his uncle Modern for being so ridiculous and failing to live up to his principles, but he is saved by Lady Bellair, who explains her game. The elder Modern so admires her libertine cleverness that he offers her all of Young Modern's inheritance, of which she accepts only the coach, silver, and furniture that the elder Modern ordered for himself at the start of the play.

At the end of the play, Lady Bellair agrees to marry Freelove, reveals Lady Lurcher's moral hypocrisy, and—following the tradition of fifth-act reformations in later libertine comedies—makes a moral statement in the last hundred words of the play, in response to the generosity of Modern's gift: "These are the only actions I can envy, and such as I only would be rich and great to imitate-- Pleasure, I have ever thought to be the chiefest good, but that pleasure is to be found no where, but in obeying reason and virtue" (5.11). She reframes the site of pleasure while remaining committed to its pursuit.

Tiffany Potter summarizes the play's reflections on Bellair's mediation of libertinism, sentiment, and gender: "The relative social liberty of widowhood allows Bellair to recreate herself not as a mere extension of a man, nor just as a woman appropriating the privilege of masculinity, but as a model for a revised eighteenth-century femininity that others might emulate ... Both libertinism and sensibility win in this play, but only when they are genuine, original and passionate, and in this balance Cooper's Rival Widows looks outside rigid binaries to locate a femininity that integrates the competing value systems of eighteenth-century culture without sacrificing the individual woman's good-natured privilege, intelligence, or passion" (20).

In addition to In a parallel plot that runs through the play, Young Modern's uncle Modern and Freelove's father Sir William Freelove debate the relationships among wealth, morality and gentlemanliness, with Modern arguing for intergenerational fiscal generosity and large allowances as long as a man "spends it like a gentleman" including "taverns, horses, gaming, women, any thing in reason ... except avarice, cowardice and hypocrisy, I can forgive him anything" (1.1). Freelove argues for parsimony as a strategy for raising a good man, leaving the younger Freelove unable to marry for love because of financial constraint. These two characters speak in conflicting languages of economy in a way that reflects several contemporary debates, and with the presence in the play of an extended scene among several merchants and creditors, Rival Widows offers a site of useful reflection on the challenge for members of various economic ranks in navigating the evolving relationships among birth, wealth, and status.

The original Covent Garden cast included John Hippisley as Sir William Freelove, Roger Bridgewater as Modern, Lacy Ryan as Freelove, Thomas Chapman as Young Modern, Anne Hallam as Lady Lurcher and Christiana Horton as Lady Bellair.

== Bibliography ==
- Burling, William J. A Checklist of New Plays and Entertainments on the London Stage, 1700-1737. Fairleigh Dickinson Univ Press, 1992.
- Nicoll, Allardyce. A History of Early Eighteenth Century Drama: 1700-1750. CUP Archive, 1927.
