= The Double Deceit =

Play by William Popple

- Original language: English
- Written by: William Popple
- Genre: Comedy

Premiere
- Date: 25 April 1735
- Place: Covent Garden Theatre

The Double Deceit is a 1735 comedy play by the British writer William Popple.

The original Covent Garden cast included John Hippisley as Sir William Courtlove, Thomas Walker as Young Courtlove, Adam Hallam as Gayliffe, Thomas Chapman as Jerry, Lacy Ryan as Bellair, Elizabeth Buchanan as Violetta, Elizabeth Vincent as Fanny and Christiana Horton as Harriet.

== Bibliography ==
- Burling, William J. A Checklist of New Plays and Entertainments on the London Stage, 1700-1737. Fairleigh Dickinson Univ Press, 1992.
- Nicoll, Allardyce. A History of Early Eighteenth Century Drama: 1700-1750. CUP Archive, 1927.
