= Merope (play) =

1731 play

- Original language: English
- Written by: George Jeffreys
- Genre: Tragedy

Premiere
- Date: 27 February 1731
- Place: Lincoln's Inn Fields Theatre

Merope is a 1731 tragedy by the British writer George Jeffreys. It takes place in Ancient Greece, based around the myth of Merope. Voltaire wrote his own play Mérope on the subject in 1743.

The original cast included Anne Berriman as Merope, James Quin as Glycon, Thomas Chapman as Nicanor, Thomas Walker as Adrastus, Lacy Ryan as Egistus, William Milward as Polydorus, Charles Hulett as Argaleon and John Ogden as Arbantes. The prologue was written by Aaron Hill.

== Bibliography ==
- Burling, William J. A Checklist of New Plays and Entertainments on the London Stage, 1700-1737. Fairleigh Dickinson Univ Press, 1992.
- Nicoll, Allardyce. History of English Drama, 1660-1900, Volume 2. Cambridge University Press, 2009.
