= John Ogden (actor) =

British stage actor

John Ogden (died 1732) was a British stage actor of the eighteenth century.

He spent his entire stage career with John Rich's company at the Lincoln's Inn Fields Theatre which he joined in 1715. He was adept at playing both comedy and tragedy. During his time on the stage he had several runs in with the law and was arrested and sent to Newgate Prison for speaking "treasonable words". Presumably an opponent of the Hanoverian Succession, he was charged in January 1723 with resisting arrest, drawing his sword and threatening anybody who didn't support the Jacobite pretender James III. After serving three months he was released and returned to the theatre.

== Selected roles ==
- Sir Jasper Manly in The Cobbler of Preston (1716)
- Butler in Woman Is a Riddle (1716)
- Lucilius in Scipio Africanus (1718)
- Freeman in A Bold Stroke for a Wife (1718)
- Petruchio in The Traitor (1718)
- Wade in Sir Walter Raleigh (1719)
- Duke of Bouillon in Henry IV of France (1719)
- Bargrave in Fatal Extravagance (1721)
- Dioclesian in The Roman Maid (1724)
- Sir Richard in The Devil of a Wife (1724)
- Lysimachus in Philip of Macedon (1727)
- Ammon in Sesostris (1728)
- Demaratus in Themistocles (1729)
- Lycon in Periander (1731)
- Perdiccas in Philotas (1731)
- Arbantes in Merope by (1731)

== Bibliography ==
- Highfill, Philip H, Burnim, Kalman A. & Langhans, Edward A. A Biographical Dictionary of Actors, Actresses, Musicians, Dancers, Managers, and Other Stage Personnel in London, 1660–1800: Garrick to Gyngell. SIU Press, 1978.
- Johanson, Kristine. Shakespeare Adaptations from the Early Eighteenth Century: Five Plays. Rowman & Littlefield, 2013.
- Straub, Kristina, G. Anderson, Misty and O'Quinn, Daniel . The Routledge Anthology of Restoration and Eighteenth-Century Drama. Taylor & Francis, 2017.
