= The Roman Maid =

1724 play

- Original language: English
- Written by: Robert Hurst
- Genre: Tragedy

Premiere
- Date: 11 August 1724
- Place: Lincoln's Inn Fields Theatre

The Roman Maid is a 1724 tragedy by the British writer Robert Hurst. It is set during the reign of the Roman Emperor Diocletian.

The original cast included John Ogden as Dioclesian, Thomas Walker as Galerius Caesar, Charles Hulett as Carus, Anthony Boheme as Paulinus and Anne Parker as Camilla.

== Bibliography ==
- Burling, William J. A Checklist of New Plays and Entertainments on the London Stage, 1700-1737. Fairleigh Dickinson Univ Press, 1992.
- Nicoll, Allardyce. A History of Early Eighteenth Century Drama: 1700-1750. CUP Archive, 1927.
