= William Hallam (theatre manager) =

English actor and theatre manager

William Hallam (born in England about 1712; died there about 1758) was an English actor and theatre manager who organized the company that gave the first professionally produced theatrical performances in the New World in 1752.

== Biography ==
He was the son of the actor Thomas Hallam, a member of the Drury Lane killed by fellow actor Charles Macklin after a dispute.

In 1731 he married the actress Anne Berriman. He became manager of the New Wells Theatre in Goodman's Fields, London. In his competition with David Garrick, who managed Drury Lane Theatre, he became bankrupt in 1750, and in the same year organized a dramatic company that was sent, under the direction of his brother Lewis, to the North American colonies and the British West Indies. The company was called the "Company of Comedians from London" and had 12 actors in the troupe. Before the actors sailed, they studied 24 plays, besides farces and medleys, which in suitable weather were rehearsed aboard ship. They also took with them costumes and scenery. William Hallam sailed for the North American colonies, landing in Yorktown, Virginia, on June 2, 1752. He remained with the comedians about one year, but did not perform. Disposing of his half interest to his brother Lewis, he returned to England in 1755, where he soon afterward died.

== Sources ==
- Davis, Andrew (2010). America's Longest Run: A History of the Walnut Street Theatre. Penn State Press. p. 12. ISBN 9780271030531.
