= Philotas (play) =

1731 play

- Original language: English
- Written by: Philip Frowde
- Genre: Tragedy

Premiere
- Date: 3 January 1731
- Place: Lincoln's Inn Fields Theatre

Philotas is a 1731 tragedy by the British writer Philip Frowde. It is based on the life of the Ancient Greek warrior Philotas who was executed for conspiring against Alexander the Great. The story had previously been written as a 1604 play by Samuel Daniel.

The cast included Lacy Ryan as Philotas, James Quin as Clitus, Anne Berriman as Antigona, John Ogden as Perdiccas, Thomas Chapman as Lysimachus, William Milward as Arsaces and Thomas Walker as Cassander.

== Bibliography ==
- Burling, William J. A Checklist of New Plays and Entertainments on the London Stage, 1700-1737. Fairleigh Dickinson Univ Press, 1992.
- Kearn, Jean B. Dramatic Satire in the Age of Walpole, 1720-1750. Iowa State University Press, 1976.
