= Benjamin Griffin (actor) =

English stage actor

Benjamin Griffin (1680–1740) was an English actor and dramatist. He was the son of the Rev. Benjamin Griffin, rector of Buxton and Oxnead in Norfolk, and chaplain to the Earl of Yarmouth.

== Early life ==
Griffin was born in Yarmouth in 1680, and educated at the free school, North Walsham. He was apprenticed to a glazier at Norwich, where in 1712 he joined a strolling company. In 1714-15 he was one of the company with which Christopher Rich opened the rebuilt theatre in Lincoln's Inn Fields.

== Acting career ==
His name first appears in surviving records, 16 Feb. 1715, as Sterling in The Perplexed Couple. On 2 June he was Ezekiel Prim, a presbyterian parson, in the A City Ramble, and on 14 June Sir Arthur Addlepate in his own farce, Love in a Sack. At this house he remained until 1721, playing many parts, including Don Lopez in his own farce, Humours of Purgatory, 3 April 1716, and 26 Jan. 1720 Sir John Indolent in his own Whig and Tory. He also played the Jew in Lord Lansdowne's Jew of Venice, altered from Shakespeare, Gomez in the Spanish Friar, Sir Hugh Evans, and Foresight in Love for Love, and took probably some part in his own Masquerade, or the Evening's Intrigue, produced for his benefit, with the Jew of Venice, 16 May 1717.

His success in characters of choleric and eccentric old men was such that Drury Lane, though possessing Norris and Johnson, both in his line, engaged him, for the sake of avoiding rivalry. His name was on the bills at Lincoln's Inn Fields in Love's Last Shift, 27 Sept. 1721. Genest assumes that this was by mistake, since Griffin appeared at Drury Lane as Polonius on the 30th of the same month. Here he remained until his death in 1740. The only part of primary importance of which he was the original at Drury Lane was Lovegold in the Miser by Fielding. He was also, at Richmond in 1715, Sapritius in Injured Virtue, his own alteration of the Virgin Martyr of Massinger. This piece was acted by the servants of the Dukes of Southampton and Cleveland. On 12 Feb. 1740 his name is for the last time, apparently, in the bills as Day in the ‘Committee.

== Dramas ==
Griffin's dramas are;

- Injured Virtue, tragedy, 12mo, 1715
- Love in a Sack, farce, 12mo, 1715
- Humours of Purgatory, farce, 12mo, 1716
- Masquerade farce, 12mo, 1717
- Whig and Tory, comedy, 8vo, 1720

The last deals rather dexterously with a political subject. The others add little to Griffin's claims on attention. In conjunction with Theobald he also wrote A Complete Key to The What D'Ye Call It of Gay, 1715, 8vo.

== Reviews ==
The Gentleman's Magazine of March 1740 speaks of him as a worthy man and an excellent actor. He died on 18 February 1740. Victor says he "was a comedian excellent in some characters", noticeably as Sir Hugh Evans and Sir Paul Pliant. The last he made a finished character. "His silly important look always excited laughter. … It was not in nature to resist bursting into laughter at the sight of him, his ridiculous distressful look, followed by a lamentable recital of his misfortunes." Victor adds: "He was a sensible, sober man, and well respected. When he died he left effects very acceptable to his sister and her children, and what is more uncommon, a good character" (Hist. of the Theatres of London and Dublin, ii. 78–80). Davies contrasts his "affected softness" with the "fanatical fury" of Ben Johnson the actor, when they were playing Tribulation and Ananias in the Alchemist (Dramatic Miscellanies, ii. 108). A portrait of the actors in these parts by Vanbleek or Van Bluck [q. v.] of Covent Garden, furnishing striking likenesses of both, was "taken off in mezzotinto, and is now published" (General Advertiser, 5 April 1748).
