= Elizabeth Cooper (dramatist) =

English actress, playwright and editor

- Born: c. 1698
- Died: c. 1761
- Known for: collecting poetry

Elizabeth Cooper or Elizabeth Price (c. 1698 – c. 1761) was an English actress, playwright, and editor. She is known for creating an early collection of poetry.

== Life ==
Elizabeth Price is thought to have been born in the year 1698 or before. She was brought up in Westminster after her father died and her mother was left a pauper. On 25 February 1722, she married John Cooper, a Covent Garden auctioneer specialising in Art and books. After her husband died in 1729, she became an actress and later a playwright. When the theatrical business took a downturn, she turned her hand to other writing.

Cooper created an anthology of poetry The Muses' Library (1737), which gathered together English verse from the 11th to the 16th century, covering Edward the Confessor to Samuel Daniel. She achieved this by contacting the family of artists and due to the goodwill of William Oldys. Despite its readability and the inclusion of relevant biographies, the book was not a commercial success, and it failed to pay for a second volume by Cooper on poetic theory. The book however did make a mark, as the frauds created by Thomas Chatterton are thought to have drawn on Cooper's book and Samuel Johnson is said to have used Cooper's book as a model for his Lives of the Poets.

Price was reported to have died in 1761, but another source says she was alive at a later date.

== Works ==
- The Rival Widows: or, Fair Libertine (1735, Covent Garden)
- The Nobleman (1736, Haymarket)
- The Muses' library [edited Cooper]. 1737.
