= Gabriel Odingsells =

British playwright

Gabriel Odingsells (1690–1734) was a British playwright.

He attended Pembroke College, Oxford. In 1725 he wrote a comedy The Bath Unmasked, set in the city of Bath, which appeared at Lincoln's Inn Fields Theatre. This was followed by The Capricious Lovers also staged at the Lincoln's Inn Fields. His 1730 ballad opera Bayes's Opera was performed at Drury Lane. In 1734 he apparently committed suicide.

== Bibliography ==
- Burling, William J. A Checklist of New Plays and Entertainments on the London Stage, 1700-1737. Fairleigh Dickinson Univ Press, 1992.
- Gagey, Edmond McAdoo. Ballad Opera. Columbia University Press, 1937.
- Highfill, Philip H, Burnim, Kalman A. & Langhans, Edward A. A Biographical Dictionary of Actors, Actresses, Musicians, Dancers, Managers, and Other Stage Personnel in London, 1660-1800: Garrick to Gyngell. SIU Press, 1978.
- Williams, Sarah F. Damnable Practises: Witches, Dangerous Women, and Music in Seventeenth-Century English Broadside Ballads. Routledge, 2016.
