= John Mottley =

English writer

John Mottley (1692–1750) was an English writer, known as a dramatist, biographer, and compiler of jokes.

== Life ==
He was the son of Colonel Thomas Mottley, a Jacobite adherent of James II in his exile, who entered the service of Louis XIV, and was killed at the battle of Turin in 1706; his mother was Dionisia, daughter of John Guise of Ablode Court, Gloucestershire. John was born in London, was educated at Archbishop Thomas Tenison's grammar school in the parish of St Martin-in-the-Fields, and obtained a clerkship in the excise office in 1708. He was compelled to resign his post in 1720, and from that time gained a precarious subsistence by his pen.

He died in 1750, having for some years previously been almost bedridden with gout.

== Works ==
Title page for Joe Miller's Jests (1739), written by Mottley as Elijah Jenkins.

He made his debut as a dramatic author with a tragedy in the pseudo-classic style, entitled The Imperial Captives, the scene of which is laid at Carthage, in the time of Genseric, who with the Empress Eudoxia and her daughter plays a principal part. The play was produced at the Theatre Royal, Lincoln's Inn Fields, in February 1719–20. At the same theatre was produced in April 1721 Mottley's only other effort in tragedy, Antiochus, based on the story of the surrender by Seleucus Nicator of his wife Stratonice to his son Antiochus. Both tragedies were printed on their production.

In comedy Mottley was more successful. In a humorous vein are his dramatic opera, Penelope, in which he was assisted by Thomas Cooke (1703–1756), a satire on Alexander Pope's Odyssey, and his farce The Craftsman, or Weekly Journalist (both performed at the Haymarket, and printed in 1728 and 1729 respectively). His comedy, The Widow Bewitched, produced at Goodman's Fields Theatre in 1730, and printed, was a successful play.

Mottley was joint author with Charles Coffey of the comic opera, The Devil to Pay, or The Wives Metamorphos'd, a ballad opera produced at Drury Lane on 6 August 1731, and frequently revived. Under the pseudonym of Robert Seymour he edited in 1734 (perhaps with the assistance of Thomas Cooke) John Stow's Survey of the Cities of London and Westminster (London, 2 volumes). Under the pseudonym of Elijah Jenkins he published in 1739 the classic jest-book, Joe Miller's Jests, or the Wit's Vade-Mecum (see Joe Miller).

Mottley is also the author of two historical works: The History of the Life of Peter I, Emperor of Russia, London, 1739, 2 vols.; and The History of the Life and Reign of the Empress Catharine, containing a short History of the Russian Empire from its first Foundation to the Time of the Death of that Princess, London, 1744, 2 vols. He is the reputed author of the Compleat List of all the English Dramatic Poets and of all the Plays ever printed in the English Language to the Present Year 1747, appended to Thomas Whincop's Scanderbeg, from internal evidence it being clear he at least wrote the article on himself. A portrait is mentioned by Bromley.
