= William Popple (colonial administrator) =

English dramatist (1701–1764)

William Popple (1701–1764) was an English official, dramatist and Governor of Bermuda.

== Life ==
He was the youngest of three sons of William Popple of the parish of St. Margaret's, Westminster, who died in 1722, and his wife Anne; William Popple was his grandfather. He entered the cofferer's office about 1730, and in June 1737 was promoted solicitor and clerk of the reports to the commissioners of trade and plantations.

Popple was appointed governor of the Bermudas in March 1745, replacing his brother Alured Popple (1699–1744), and held that post until shortly before his death at Hampstead on 8 February 1764. He was buried on 13 February in Hampstead churchyard, where there is an inscribed stone in his memory.

== Works ==
Some of Popple's juvenile poems were included in the Collection of Miscellaneous Poems issued by Richard Savage in 1726.

Aaron Hill encouraged the writing of two comedies, to which Hill wrote prologues:

- The Lady's Revenge, or the Rover reclaim'd (London and Dublin, 1734), was dedicated to Frederick, Prince of Wales, and was produced on four occasions at Covent Garden in January 1734.
- The Double Deceit, or a Cure for Jealousy (London, 1736), dedicated to Edward Walpole, was produced on 25 April 1735, also at Covent Garden.

About this same time (1735) Popple collaborated with Hill in his Prompter, and incurred a share of Alexander Pope's resentment, with a line in the Dunciad. He also published, in 1753, a translation (1753) of the Ars Poetica of Horace, which he dedicated to the Earl of Halifax.
