= John Leigh (18th-century actor) =

John Leigh (1689–1726) was an Irish actor and dramatist.

== Stage career ==
Leigh appeared as Demetrius in Thomas Shadwell's adaptation of Timon of Athens, produced at Dublin's Smock Alley Theatre in 1714. Recruited by John Rich for London's newly erected theatre in Lincoln's Inn Fields, he played there on the opening night, 18 December 1714, as Captain Plume in The Recruiting Officer by George Farquhar. Leigh remained at Lincoln's Inn until his death, and played some original parts. The last part to which Leigh's name appears is Phorbas in Œdipus, 14 April 1726.

On 26 November 1719 Leigh acted Lord George Belmour in his own comedy The Pretenders (published 1720), original title Kensington Garden, or the Pretenders. This was acted about seven times, and is dedicated to Lord Brooke, an original supporter of the theatre. On 11 January 1720 a new farce by Leigh in two acts, Hob's Wedding, (published 1720), was acted for the first time. It was repeated six times, the author having benefits on the third and fifth nights. Leigh's share in this was minor, the piece consisting only of the scenes of the Country Wake, which Thomas Doggett cut when he converted it into Flora, or Hob in the Well, It was, according to John Genest, printed, with songs added by John Hippisley, in 1732 as the Sequel to Flora, and was revived in the same year. William Rufus Chetwood gave in his short life of Leigh a ballad written by him to the tune of Thomas, I cannot, a humorous song about other actors.

Leigh died in 1726. Nicknamed Handsome Leigh, he was initially popular, but did not sustain his position. After Lacy Ryan and Thomas Walker joined the company, he fell into the background.

== Notes ==
Attribution

This article incorporates text from a publication now in the public domain: Lee, Sidney, ed. (1892). "Leigh, John". Dictionary of National Biography. Vol. 32. London: Smith, Elder & Co.
