= Anna Maria Seymour =

English actress

- Born: c. 1692
- Died: 10 July 1723; Norfolk

Anna Maria Seymour or Mrs Seymour (c. 1692 – 10 July 1723) was a British actress.

== Life ==
Seymour is first heard of in 1717 when she appeared at Drury Lane in The Scowrers. She took leading roles in Richard III and Hamlet with Lacy Ryan as well as appearing with James Quin in Othello and with him as Lady Macbeth. In 1718-19 she moved to John Rich's theatre at Lincoln's Inn Fields to take leading roles.

Her most noted role was as Marianne in Elijah Fenton's play of the same name. Her final appearance was with her future husband on 7 June 1723. She married Anthony Boheme who was also a leading actor in 1723 and she was said to have been lost to the profession. However the marriage did not last the year as she died in Norwich only months after her wedding. Boheme went on to marry again.
