= David Lewis (poet) =

British poet (1682–1760)

David Lewis (1682 – April 1760) was an 18th-century British poet.

== Life ==
Lewis was the son of Roger Lewis of Llanddewi Felffre, in the county of Pembrokeshire, and was probably born in Wales. He studied at Jesus College, Oxford, matriculating in 1698 and obtaining his Bachelor of Arts degree in 1702. He was undermaster at Westminster School (1726–1732). During this time, he started to publish poetry, beginning in 1726 with Miscellaneous Poems by Several Hands, which mixed various styles of poetry from different London-based poets from Oxford and Cambridge. Some unidentified poems were by Lewis himself. The collection contained the final revision of John Dyer's Grongar Hill as well as the first draft of Alexander Pope's Vital spark of heavenly flame (1712). Lewis and Pope were in contact thereafter, and Pope's support was acknowledged by Lewis in the introduction to Philip of Macedon, a tragedy by Lewis performed in May 1727. A second volume of poetry, by various people (including Lewis) was published in 1730. Lewis died at Low Leyton in Essex in April 1760, and was buried at Leyton Parish Church. His wife, Mary, died in 1774 and was buried with him.
