= Lisle's Tennis Court =

Building in London, England

Coordinates: 51°30′55″N 0°6′55″W

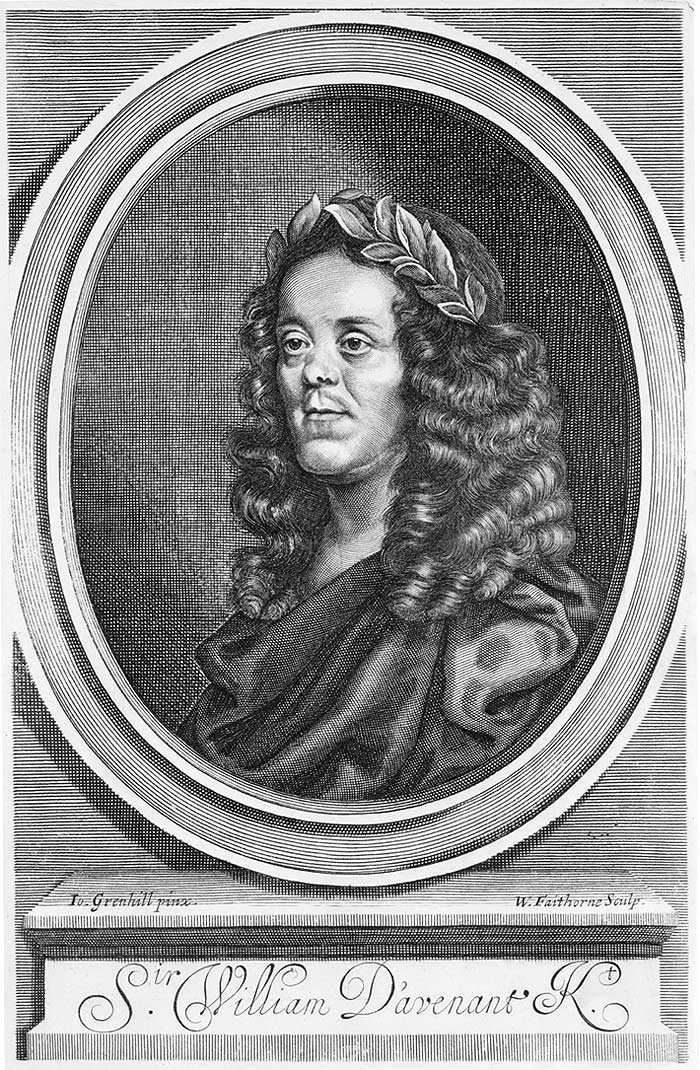
William Davenant had Lisle's Tennis Court converted into a theatre in 1661. His troupe continued to perform there after his death in 1668, until 1671.

Lisle's Tennis Court was a building off Portugal Street in Lincoln's Inn Fields in London. Originally built as a real tennis court, it was used as a playhouse during two periods, 1661–1674 and 1695–1705. During the early period, the theatre was called Lincoln's Inn Fields Playhouse, also known as The Duke's Playhouse, The New Theatre or The Opera. The building was rebuilt in 1714, and used again as a theatre for a third period, 1714–1732. The tennis court theatre was the first public playhouse in London to feature the moveable scenery that would become a standard feature of Restoration theatres.

== Historical background ==
The period beginning in England in 1642 and lasting until 1660 is known as the Interregnum, meaning "between kings." At this time, there was no monarch on the throne, and theatre was against the law. Spanning from 1642 to 1649, the English Civil War occurred. This war was an uprising by Parliamentarians against the current King of England, King Charles I, led by Oliver Cromwell, a Puritan. Cromwell's opposition to the throne was religious but political, as well, which led him to build up an army with the ability to imprison King Charles, who was beheaded in 1649, ending the war. After his death, the King's wife and children were given permission to leave the country, so they travelled to France to escape and receive protection.

The years following became known as the Commonwealth Era (1649–1660) because Cromwell, who established himself as the monarch figure without assuming any official authority, ruled the nation with Parliament support and renamed the England Republic to the English Commonwealth. These were tough times for England as Cromwell persecuted many families, especially those who fought on the behalf of King Charles I and Irish families that held rustic Catholic beliefs. Needless to say, Oliver Cromwell quickly fell out of the majority's favour, and he died in 1658 of natural causes. Two years later, Charles II, the beheaded king's son, returned to England and began the Restoration by restoring the throne and claiming his role as the proper King of England.

In addition, King Charles II's return restored the legality of theatre. This history is significant because it explains that since Charles II spent most of his life in France, he, as King, appreciated French culture, which prominently impressed upon England during the Restoration, particularly Restoration theatre.

== Structure ==
There are no extant paintings, elaborate diagrams, or other forms of visual evidence of the inside of the Lincoln's Inn theatre, but certain aspects are understood of the theatre according to its time period. However, a great example of the layout of the inside is the Georgian Theatre Royal in Richmond, North Yorkshire, which contains components of Restoration theatre spaces and still stands today. Lincoln's Inn Fields Playhouse was very small. In fact, Milhous believes that "the smaller seating capacity… hurt the [Duke’s] company in the long run" as they moved as newer theatres came along (Milhous 71). It was around 75 feet long by 30 feet wide with about a 650-person audience seating maximum capacity (The Restoration Theater; Wilson and Goldfarb 249). It was originally an indoor tennis court; courts were used as theatre spaces because they had a similar structure with a narrow, rectangular shape and gallery seating. The stage was raked, sloping upward toward the back of the stage, in order to help with perspective. The audience was divided into the pit, boxes, and galleries. The pit had backless benches and a raked floor that rose toward the back of the audience to help sightlines. Mostly single men sat here, and it was the noisiest, rowdiest area in the theatre. Boxes sat upper class aristocrats—mostly married couples with wives who wanted to be seen. Galleries held the lower class, including servants of the upper classes in attendance.

The English stage, unlike French or Italian theatres, had a very deep apron to provide adequate acting space, and the background and perspective scenery served as solely as scenery. The Lincoln's Inn Fields Playhouse orchestra was housed beneath the stage, and the apron was extended two feet to cover completely the orchestra pit and obtain close proximity between the actors and the audience, creating an intimate atmosphere. Another uniqueness of English theatres is that there were typically two pairs of doors, one on each side of the stage, called proscenium doors with balconies above them for the actors to utilize in performances. Proscenium doors served as entrances and exits disregarding the possibility of multiple locations. Candelabras provided light for the space, and manual moveable scenery was used to move the show along (The Restoration Theater).

== The Duke's Company ==
The building was constructed as a real tennis court in 1656. Thomas Lisle's wife Anne Tyler and a man named James Hooker developed the indoor court in the winter of 1656 and 1657. Tudor-style real tennis courts were long, high-ceiling buildings, with galleries for spectators; their dimensions — about 75 by 30 feet — are similar to the earlier theatres, and much larger than a modern tennis court.

After the English Restoration in 1660, Lincoln's Inn Fields Playhouse received its first company through the efforts of the King himself and two men who dedicated themselves to theatre. Sir William Davenant had received a patent from Charles the I in 1639 when he was in power, but he had never used it due to the theatre ban. When theatre was restored, Davenant and a man named Thomas Killigrew wanted to create theatre in England and thus, Killigrew obtained a warrant expressing that he could "raise a company and a theatre, provided that his company and Davenant's should be the only ones allowed to play in London" (Hotson 199). Davenant, then, drafted their joint warrant and after much debate over whether or not their role in theatre infringed on the Master of the Revels' power, they appealed to Charles II. Charles II determined their Letters of Patent were valid and created two companies to perform "legitimate drama" in London: the Duke's Company of his brother, The Duke of York, led by William Davenant, and his company, the King's Company, led by Thomas Killigrew. Original intentions were positive, but competition was quickly apparent between the two. Both companies briefly performed in the theatrical spaces that had survived the interregnum and civil war (including the Cockpit and Salisbury Court), but scrambled to quickly acquire facilities that were more to current tastes. Taking a hint from their new King's taste, Killigrew and Davenant both chose a solution that had been used in France: converting tennis courts into theatres.

In March 1660, Sir William Davenant contracted to lease Lisle's Tennis Court in order to renovate it into a theatre, and he bought adjoining land to expand the building into the garden area. Killigrew's theatre on Vere Street (Gibbon's Tennis Court) opened first, in November 1660. Davenant apparently spent more time in his remodelling: Lincoln's Inn Fields opened on 28 June 1661, with the first "moveable" or "changeable" scenery used on the British public stage, and the first proscenium arch. Wings or shutters ran in grooves and could be smoothly and mechanically changed between or even within acts. The production was a revamped version of Davenant's own five-year-old opera The Siege of Rhodes where the soon-to-be famous actor, Thomas Betterton, performed the prologue. The result was such a sensation that it brought Charles II to a public theatre for the first time. This production at Lincoln's Inn Fields Playhouse "emptied Killigrew's theatre" according to Milhous (19). Milhous also explains that the companies and other theatres "deliberately engaged in vicious head-on collision[s], mounting the same plays" (19). The competing King's Company suddenly found itself playing to empty houses, as diarist and devoted playgoer Samuel Pepys notes on 4 July:

I went to the theatre [in Vere Street] and there I saw Claracilla (the first time I ever saw it), well acted. But strange to see this house, that use to be so thronged, now empty since the opera begun—and so will continue for a while I believe.

The Siege of Rhodes "continued acting 12 days without interruption with great applause" according to the prompter John Downes in his "historical review of the stage" Roscius Anglicanus (1708). This was a remarkable run for the limited potential audience of the time. More acclaimed productions by the Duke's Company "with scenes" followed at Lincoln's Inn Fields in the course of 1661 (including Hamlet and Twelfth Night), all highly admired by Pepys. The King's Company was forced to abandon their own, technically unsophisticated tennis-court theatre and commission the construction of a new theatre in Bridges Street, where the Theatre Royal opened in 1663.

Prince Cosimo III of Tuscany visited the Lisle theatre in 1669, and his official diarist left us this account:

[The pit] is surrounded within by separate compartments in which there are several degrees [steps] of seating for the greater comfort of the ladies and gentlemen who, according to the liberal custom of the country, share the same boxes. Down below [in the pit] there remains a broad space for other members of the audience. The scenery is entirely changeable, with various transformations and lovely perspectives. Before the play begins, to render the waiting less annoying and inconvenient, there are very graceful instrumental pieces to be heard, with the result that many go early just to enjoy this part of the entertainment.

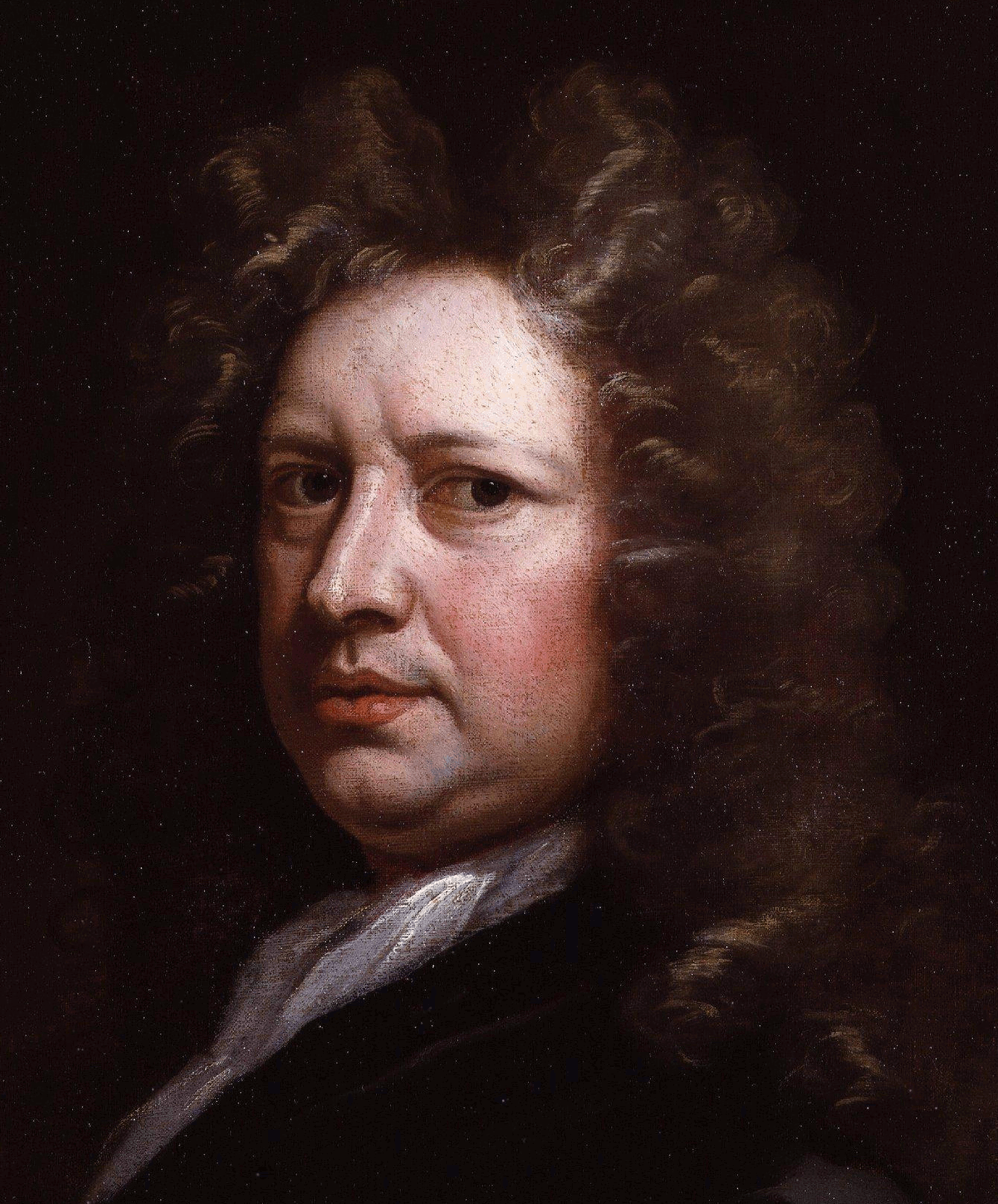
Thomas Betterton painted by Sir Godfrey Kneller.

The theatre was implicated by the Grand Jury of Middlesex on 7 July 1703 for showcasing "profane, irrelevant, lewd, indecent, and immoral expressions". It was also a hot target for riots and disorderly assemblies, murders, and other misdemeanors, but despite its troubles, the theatre remained very popular including hosting the first paid performance of Purcell's Dido and Aeneas in 1700 and Handel's final two operas (Pedicord 41).

Davenant died in 1668 and the Duke's Company, now under Thomas Betterton, performed out of Lincoln's Inns Fields until 1671, when they relocated to the elaborate new Dorset Garden Theatre which was more popular at the time. In 1672, the theatre in Bridges Street burnt down, and the King's Company temporarily occupied the recently vacated Lincoln's Inn Field, until their new theatre opened in 1674.

== Betterton ==
The building was converted back to a tennis court and remained one for almost 20 years. During that time, the Duke's Company, occupying the Dorset Theatre, subsumed the King's Company, housed in the newly rebuilt Theatre Royal, to form the United Company, performing out of Drury Lane. Betterton, a famous English actor, was forced out as the head of the company in 1688, staying on as an actor (and filling a day-to-day managerial role) while a succession of leaders embezzled funds and cut costs by cutting actors' salaries. This uniting created many conflicts between the members of the companies. For example, each company would have one actor who would always play Hamlet, but when the companies are combined, who claims the role?

Due to rivalry and competition within the United Company, Thomas Betterton petitioned to the king to separate and create his own company. So, under Christopher Rich, the United Company split. Betterton left with a band of actors and a newly issued license to perform, and from 1695 to 1705 his company performed back at Lincoln's Inn Fields Playhouse, refurbishing the abandoned building back into a theatre. The New Theatre in Lincoln's Inn Fields opened in April 1695 with William Congreve's Love for Love. It was later the first venue for Congreve's plays The Mourning Bride (1697) and The Way of the World (1700) and for Vanbrugh's comedy The Provoked Wife (1697).

== Rich ==
The building went unused as a theatre from 1705 until it was refurbished again in 1714. Colley Cibber in his Apology wrote that Christopher Rich “rebuilt that Theatre from the Ground, as it is now standing”. This has led to the belief that Rich demolished the entire building. If the structure was sound, this would have been unnecessary, time-consuming and expensive, especially as Cibber adds that Rich did it at his own expense. It is far more likely that it was merely the interior that was rebuilt, and Cibber's text has been misinterpreted.

Supporting evidence for this comes from the first issue of the British Journal on 22 September 1722 which reported that a fresco of Betterton, with other theatre figures of the period, had been uncovered during redecoration of the theatre. Rich also had no guarantee that he would receive a licence for the theatre, and would have kept costs to a minimum. As it turned out, he was able to take advantage of the accession of George 1st in August 1714 to obtain the necessary permission. Christopher Rich died in November 1714, but his son John Rich led a company at the theatre until 1728. On 29 January 1728, Rich's theatre hosted the first, very successful, production of John Gay's The Beggar's Opera (making "Rich gay and Gay rich").

The theatre was abandoned in December 1732, when the company moved to the new Covent Garden Theatre, built by Rich using the capital generated by The Beggar's Opera. A few years later Henry Giffard moved his company from Goodman's Fields at a time when he was trying to establish a third major theatre company in London. The Licensing Act 1737 largely dashed these hopes, although he continued to stage plays at Lincoln's Inn for several more years.

The old building was subsequently used as a barracks, an auction room, a warehouse for china, and was finally demolished in 1848 to make room for an extension to the neighbouring premises of the Royal College of Surgeons.

== Selected premieres at the theatre ==
- The Siege of Rhodes by William Davenant (1661)
- Love and Honour by William Davenant (1661)
- The Cutter of Coleman Street by Abraham Cowley (1661)
- The Law Against Lovers by William Davenant (1662)
- The Villain by Thomas Porter (1662)
- The Stepmother by Robert Stapylton (1663)
- The Adventures of Five Hours by Samuel Tuke (1663)
- The Slighted Maid by Robert Stapylton (1663)
- The Comical Revenge by George Etherege (1664)
- The Rivals by William Davenant (1664)
- Mustapha by Roger Boyle (1665)
- The English Princess by John Caryll (1667)
- She Would If She Could by George Etherege (1668)
- Tryphon by Roger Boyle (1668)
- The Sullen Lovers by Thomas Shadwell (1668)
- The Women's Conquest by Edward Howard (1670)
- Cambyses, King Of Persia by Elkanah Settle (1671)
- The Six Days' Adventure by Edward Howard (1671)
- Herod and Mariamne by Samuel Pordage (1671)
- The Town Shifts by Edward Revet (1671)
- Juliana by John Crowne (1671)
- The Assignation by John Dryden (1672)
- The Reformation by Joseph Arrowsmith (1673)
- Amboyna by John Dryden (1673)
- The Amorous Old Woman by Thomas Duffett (1674)
- Love for Love by William Congreve (1695)
- The Lover's Luck by Thomas Dilke (1695)
- Cyrus the Great by John Banks (1695)
- The She-Gallants by George Granville (1695)
- The City Bride by Joseph Harris (1696)
- The Country Wake by Thomas Doggett (1696)
- The City Lady by Thomas Dilke (1696)
- The Deceiver Deceived by Mary Pix (1697)
- The Italian Husband by Edward Ravenscroft (1697)
- The Mourning Bride by William Congreve (1697)
- The Novelty by Peter Anthony Motteux (1697)
- The Provoked Wife by John Vanburgh (1697)
- The Innocent Mistress by Mary Pix (1697)
- The Pretenders by Thomas Dilke (1698)
- Beauty in Distress by Peter Motteux (1698)
- Rinaldo and Armida by John Dennis (1698)
- The False Friend by Mary Pix (1699)
- Friendship Improved by Charles Hopkins (1699)
- The Way of the World by William Congreve (1700)
- The Ambitious Stepmother by Nicholas Rowe (1700)
- The Fate of Capua by Thomas Southerne (1700)
- Antiochus the Great by Jane Wiseman (1701)
- Love's Victim by Charles Gildon (1701)
- The Czar of Muscovy by Mary Pix (1701)
- The Double Distress by Mary Pix (1701)
- The Ladies Visiting Day by William Burnaby (1701)
- Tamerlane by Nicholas Rowe (1701)
- The Beau's Duel by Susanna Centlivre (1702)
- The Governour of Cyprus by John Oldmixon (1702)
- The Stolen Heiress by Susanna Centlivre (1702)
- As You Find It by Charles Boyle (1703)
- The Fair Penitent by Nicholas Rowe (1703)
- Marry, or Do Worse by William Walker (1703)
- The Different Widows by Mary Pix (1703)
- Love Betrayed by William Burnaby (1703)
- The Biter by Nicholas Rowe (1704)
- The Stage Coach by George Farquhar (1704)
- Love At First Sight by David Crawford (1704)
- Squire Trelooby by William Congreve and John Vanbrugh (1704)
- The Gamester by Susanna Centlivre (1705)
- A Woman's Revenge by Christopher Bullock (1715)
- The Perplexed Couple by Charles Molloy (1715)
- The Doating Lovers by Newburgh Hamilton (1715)
- A City Ramble by Charles Knipe (1715)
- The Northern Heiress by Mary Davys (1716)
- The Cobbler of Preston by Christopher Bullock (1716)
- Everybody Mistaken by William Taverner (1716)
- The Fatal Vision by Aaron Hill (1716)
- The Perfidious Brother by Lewis Theobald (1716)
- Woman Is a Riddle by Christopher Bullock (1716)
- The Artful Husband by William Taverner (1717)
- A Bold Stroke for a Wife by Susanna Centlivre (1718)
- The Coquet by Charles Molloy (1718)
- The Lady's Triumph by Lewis Theobald (1718)
- Scipio Africanus by Charles Beckingham (1718)
- The Traitor by Christopher Bullock (1718)
- Henry IV of France by Charles Beckingham (1719)
- Kensington Gardens by John Leigh (1719)
- Sir Walter Raleigh by George Sewell (1719)
- 'Tis Well if it Takes by William Taverner (1719)
- The Half-Pay Officers by Charles Molloy (1720)
- Hob's Wedding by John Leigh (1720)
- The Imperial Captives by John Mottley (1720)
- Whig and Tory by Benjamin Griffin (1720)
- Antiochus by John Mottley (1721)
- The Fair Captive by Eliza Haywood (1721)
- Fatal Extravagance by Aaron Hill (1721)
- The Chimera by Thomas Odell (1721)
- Hanging and Marriage by Henry Carey (1722)
- Hibernia Freed by William Phillips (1722)
- The Compromise by John Sturmy (1722)
- Love and Duty by John Sturmy (1722)
- Mariamne by Elijah Fenton (1723)
- The Fatal Legacy by Jane Robe (1723)
- Belisarius by William Phillips (1724)
- Edwin by George Jeffreys (1724)
- The Roman Maid by Robert Hurst (1724)
- The Bath Unmasked by Gabriel Odingsells (1725)
- The Capricious Lovers by Gabriel Odingsells (1725)
- The Female Fortune Teller by Charles Johnson (1726)
- Money the Mistress by Thomas Southerne (1726)
- The Dissembled Wanton by Leonard Welsted (1726)
- Philip of Macedon by David Lewis (1727)
- The Fall of Saguntum by Philip Frowde (1727)
- The Beggar's Opera by John Gay (1728)
- Sesostris by John Sturmy (1728)
- The Virgin Queen by Richard Barford (1728)
- Frederick, Duke of Brunswick-Lunenburgh by Eliza Haywood (1729)
- Themistocles by Samuel Madden (1729)
- Sylvia by George Lillo (1730)
- The Wife of Bath by John Gay (1730)
- Orestes by Lewis Theobald (1731)
- Merope by George Jeffreys (1731)
- Philotas by Philip Frowde (1731)
- The Married Philosopher by John Kelly (1732)
- A Tutor for the Beaus by John Hewitt (1736)
- All Alive and Merry by Samuel Johnson (1736)
- The Independent Patriot by Francis Lynch (1737)
- Charles I by William Havard (1737)

== Bibliography ==
- Avery, Emmett L., and Arthur H. Scouten. The London Stage 1660-1700: A Critical Introduction. Arcturus Books. Southern Illinois University Press, 1968. Print.
- Donohue, Joseph ed. (2004). The Cambridge History of British Theatre: Volume 2, 1660 to 1885. Cambridge University Press. Excerpt online.
- Gaunt, Peter. "Cromwellian Britain - Lindsey House, Lincoln's Inn Fields, London." The Oliver Cromwell Website. The Cromwell Association, n.d. Web. 5 Feb 2013. <http://www.olivercromwell.org/lindsey_house.htm>.
- Hartnoll, Phyllis; Found, Peter (1996). "Lincoln's Inn Fields Theatre" The Concise Oxford Companion to the Theatre. Oxford University Press.
- Hotson, Leslie. The Commonwealth and Restoration Stage. Cambridge: Harvard University Press, 1928. Print.
- Langhans, Edward (2001). "The Post-1660 Theatres as Performance Spaces". Owen, Sue A Companion to Restoration Drama. Oxford: Blackwell.
- Milhous, Judith (1979). Thomas Betterton and the Management of Lincoln's Inn Fields 1695–1708. Carbondale, Illinois: Southern Illinois University Press.
- Spiers, Rupert (2002). Indoor Tennis Courts from the Restoration Theatres site. Retrieved 14 August 2006.
- Styan, John (1996). The English Stage: A History of Drama and Performance. Cambridge University Press.
- The Restoration Theater: From Tennis Court to Playhouse. 2004. Film. Jan 2013.
- Wilson, Edwin, and Alvin Goldfarb. Living Theatre: History of Theatre. 6th ed. New York: McGraw-Hill Companies, Inc, 2012. Print.
