= Philip Frowde =

English poet and dramatist

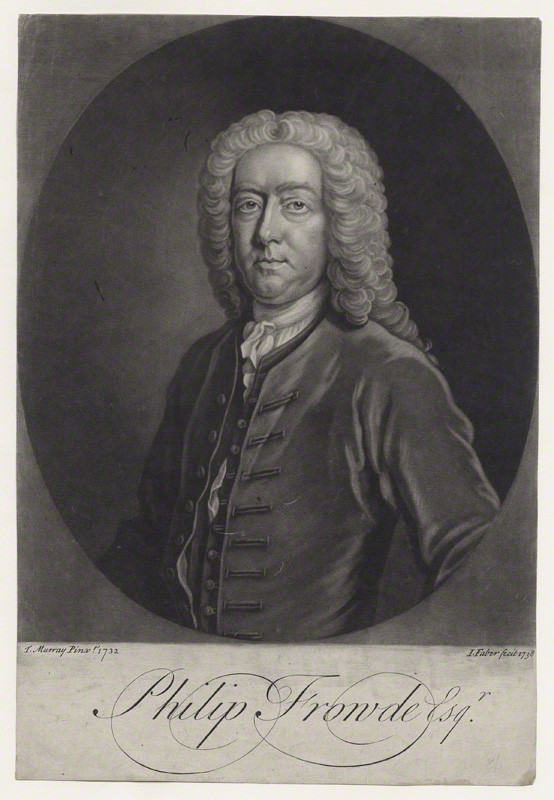
Philip Frowde, engraving by John Faber the Younger after Thomas Murray

Philip Frowde (died 1738) was an English poet and dramatist.

== Life ==
Frowde was the son of Philip Frowde, deputy postmaster-general from 1678 to 1688. His grandfather, Colonel Philip Frowde, for his faithful adherence to Charles I and Charles II was knighted on 10 March 1664–5, and appointed governor of the post office.

From Eton College, where young Philip was contemporary with Robert Walpole, Frowde passed to Magdalen College, Oxford, as a gentleman-commoner, and became one of Joseph Addison's pupils. He did not take a degree.

Frowde died unmarried at his lodgings in Cecil Street, Strand, in December 1738, and was buried in the cemetery in Lamb's Conduit Fields.

== Works ==
To vol. ii. of Musarum Anglicanarum Analecta (Oxford, 1699, edited by Addison), Frowde contributed Cursus Glacialis, Anglicè, Scating. In May 1720 Edmund Curll published these verses as Addison's, together with an English version also supposed to be Addison's, and a preface by one T. N., who stated that although Addison was well known to be the author, he had always allowed Frowde to pass them off as his own. An anonymous imitation in English appeared in 1774; there is also a translation in Miscellane by J.G. (James Glassford), Edinburgh, 1818.

Frowde wrote a blank verse tragedy entitled The Fall of Saguntum, London, 1727, influenced by Cato, a Tragedy. It was acted at Lincoln's Inn Fields Theatre on 16 January 1727, James Quin representing Eurydamas and delivering the prologue by Lewis Theobald. The tragedy obtained only about three representations, and is noted for a dedication to [Walpole, who is described as "bringing the learning and arts of Greece and Rome into the cabinet; either that to instruct in the depths of reasoning; or these in the rules of governing". Before its performance A. B., (possibly Frowde himself) undertook to explain for the benefit of "a lady of quality" the historical and classical allusions in the play in The History of Saguntum (1727), which also argues the dramatist's superiority over Silius Italicus, from whose Punica the plot was partly derived. Another lugubrious tragedy in blank verse, Philotas, London, 1731 (also 1735), brought out at Lincoln's Inn Fields on 3 February 1730–1, with Quin again in the cast, met with an even colder reception, though it ran for six nights. Henry Fielding introduced an ironical encomium on Philotas in Joseph Andrews.
