= Elizabeth Younger =

British actress and dancer

Elizabeth Finch (née Younger; 2 September 1699 – 24 November 1762) was an English actress and dancer.

Younger's sister, Margaret Bicknell, was a singer and actress. Younger married John Finch, the son of Daniel Finch, 7th Earl of Winchilsea.
