= 1731 in literature =

This article contains information about the literary events and publications of 1731.

== Events ==
- January 1 – The Gentleman's Magazine: or, Trader's monthly intelligencer is launched by Edward Cave in London.
- May – The Abbé Prévost's Manon Lescaut (Histoire du Chevalier des Grieux, et de Manon Lescaut) is first published as the 7th and last volume of his récit Memoirs and Adventures of a Man of Quality in Amsterdam.
- July – Alexander Pope completes the original writing of his poem An Essay on Man with the first two "Epistles: Of the Nature and State of Man, with Respect to" (1) "The Universe" and (2) "Himself as an Individual". The third and fourth will ensue in 1733 and 1734.
- July 1 – Benjamin Franklin and fellow subscribers start the Library Company of Philadelphia.
- August 20 – The Hollandsche Spectator is launched by Justus van Effen in Amsterdam.
- October 23 – A fire at Ashburnham House in London damages the nationally owned Cotton Library, housed there at the time. The librarian, Dr Bentley, leaps from a window with the priceless Codex Alexandrinus under one arm. The original manuscripts of Asser's Life of King Alfred (9th century) and The Battle of Maldon (Old English) are destroyed; so largely is the 5th-century Cotton Genesis; and the Chronicon Æthelweardi is badly damaged; but the unique manuscript of Beowulf is damaged but saved.
- December 11 – Bishop Thomas Tanner's valuable collection of books, on its way from Norwich to his new home at Oxford by barge, is damaged when the barge sinks at Wallingford.
- unknown dates
  - The life and revelations of the Austrian Beguine Agnes Blannbekin (died 1315) are published from her religious confessions for the first time, as Venerabilis Agnetis Blannbekin, but all copies are confiscated by the Jesuits.
  - The Jesuit father Joseph Henri Marie de Prémare translates a 13th-century Chinese work, The Orphan of Zhao, into French as L'Orphelin de la Maison de Tchao. This makes it the first Chinese play to be translated into any European language.

== New books ==
=== Prose ===
- Thomas Bayes – Divine Benevolence
- Samuel Boyse – Translations and Poems Written on Several Subjects
- Ralph Cudworth (died 1688) – A Treatise Concerning Eternal and Immutable Morality
- Robert Dodsley
  - An Epistle from a Footman in London to the Celebrated Stephen Duck
  - A Sketch of the Miseries of Poverty
- Aaron Hill – Advice to the Poets
- Marie Huber – Le Monde fou préféré au monde sage, en vingt-quatre promenades de trois amis, Criton philosophe, Philon avocat, Eraste négociant (The world unmask'd: or, The philosopher the greatest cheat; in twenty-four dialogues between Crito a philosopher, Philo a lawyer, and Erastus, a merchant)
- Madame de La Fayette – Memoires de la Cour de France
- William Law – The Case of Reason
- Pierre de Marivaux – La Vie de Marianne (The Life of Marianne), part one
- William Oldys – A Dissertation Upon Pamphlets
- Arabella Plantin – Love Led Astray (Or, the Mutual Inconstancy)
- Alexander Pope – An Epistle to the Right Honourable Richard Earl of Burlington (also Epistle to Burlington, and to contemporaries as Of False Taste)
- Abbé Prévost
  - Manon Lescaut
  - Le Philosophe anglais, ou Histoire de Monsieur Cleveland, fils naturel de Cromwell (The Life and Entertaining Adventures of Mr. Cleveland, Natural Son of Oliver Cromwell)
- Elizabeth Singer Rowe – Letters Moral and Entertaining
- Jean Terrasson – Life of Sethos
- Jethro Tull – The New Horse-Houghing Husbandry, or, An essay on the principles of tillage and vegetation wherein is shewn, a method of introducing a sort of vineyard-culture into the corn-fields, to increase their product, and diminish the common expence, by the use of instruments lately invented by Jethro Tull
- Diego de Torres Villarroel – Barca de Aqueronte

=== Drama ===
- Matthew Concanen, Edward Roome, & Sir William Yonge – The Jovial Crew (opera, adapted from Richard Brome's A Jovial Crew)
- Theophilus Cibber – The Lover
- Charles Coffey & John Mottley – The Devil to Pay (musical adaptation of the play by Thomas Jevon)
- Thomas Cooke – The Triumphs of Love and Honour
- Henry Fielding
  - The Tragedy of Tragedies; or, The Life and Death of Tom Thumb
  - The Letter-Writers
- Philip Frowde – Philotas
- Aaron Hill – Athelwold
- George Jeffreys – Merope
- George Lillo – The London Merchant
- David Mallet – Eurydice
- James Ralph – The Fall of the Earl of Essex
- Lewis Theobald – Orestes
- John Tracy – Periander

=== Poetry ===
- Nicholas Amhurst (as Caleb D'Anvers) – A Collection of Poems
- Jeremy Jingle (pseudonym) – Spiritual Fornication. A burlesque poem. Wherein the case of Miss Cadiere and Father Girard are merrily display'd
- Joseph Trapp – The Works of Virgil

== Births ==
- February 4 – Mary Deverell, English religious writer, essayist and poet (died 1805)
- March 28 – Ramón de la Cruz, Spanish dramatist (died 1794)
- November 25 – Gustaf Fredrik Gyllenborg, Swedish writer (died 1808)
- November 26 – William Cowper, English poet and cleric (died 1800)
- December 12 – Erasmus Darwin, English naturalist, natural philosopher and poet (died 1802)

== Deaths ==
- February 20 – Frances Norton, Lady Norton, English poet and religious writer (born c. 1644)
- c. April 24 – Daniel Defoe, English novelist and travel writer (born c. 1660)
- May 11 – Mary Astell, English protofeminist writer (born 1666)
- June 20 – Ned Ward (Edward Ward), English satirist and publican (born 1667)
- December 26 – Antoine Houdar de la Motte, French dramatist (born 1672)
- unknown date – Mohammed ibn Zakri al-Fasi, Moroccan poet, mystic and theologian (year of birth unknown)
