= Adaptations of Manon Lescaut =

Adaptations of 1731 novel

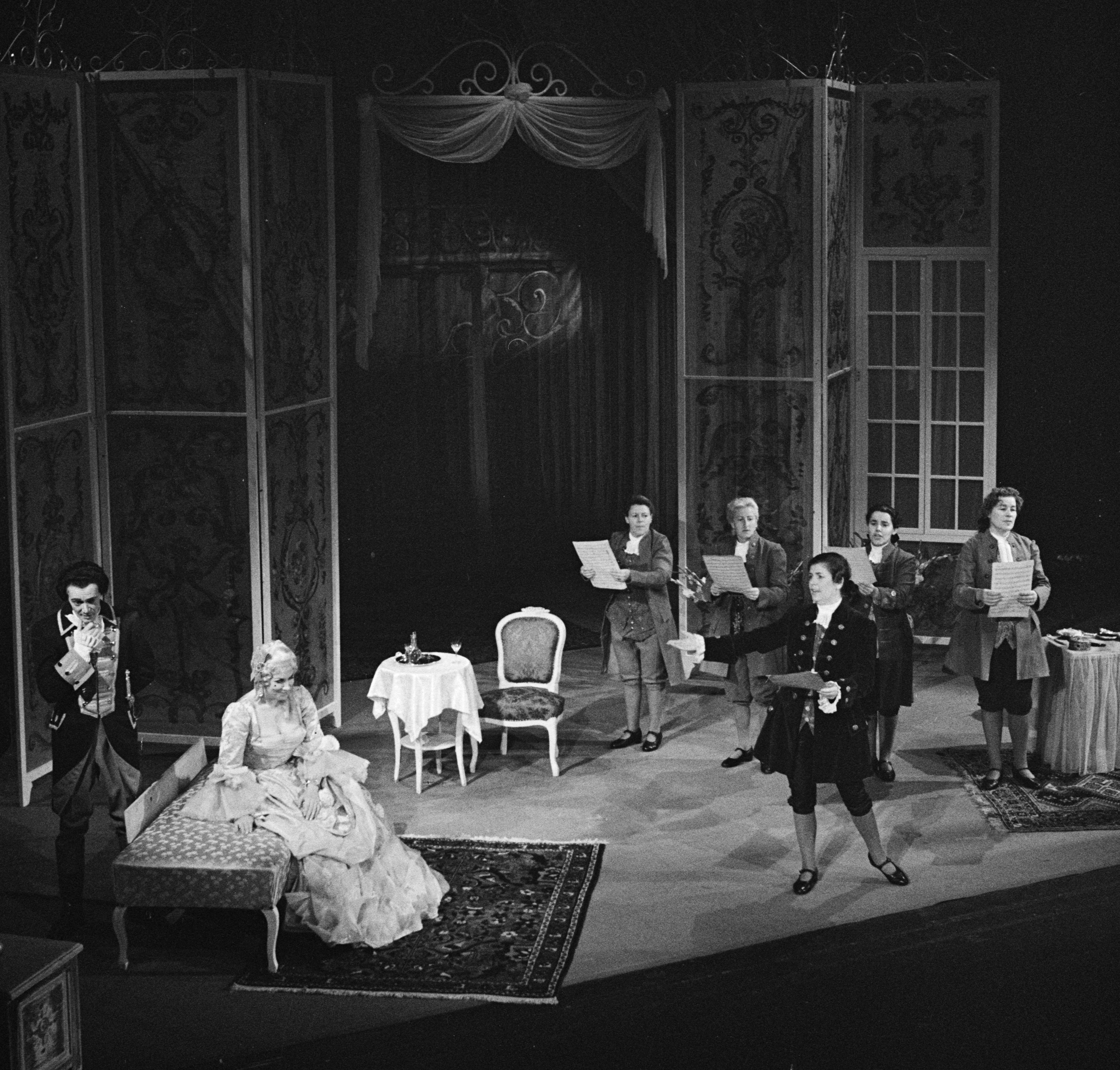
1957 performance of Giacomo Puccini's 1893 opera Manon Lescaut

The French novel Manon Lescaut (1731) by Antoine François Prévost has been adapted many times into stage plays, ballets, operas, and films. Manon Lescaut tells a tragic love story about a nobleman (known only as the Chevalier (Note: "Chevalier" can be translated as "knight" but in eighteenth century France it was used by nobleman who did not have specific territorial titles, without joining a chivalric order.) des Grieux) and a common woman (Manon Lescaut). Their decision to live together without marrying is the start of a moral decline that also leads to gambling, fraud, theft, murder, and Manon's death as a deported correction girl in New Orleans.

The first adaptation was a theatrical comedy in 1772. Early theatrical and operatic adaptations were not particularly successful, but in the nineteenth century, several major operas were produced. The most renowned adaptations of Manon Lescaut are the operas by Daniel Auber (1856), Jules Massenet (1884), and Giacomo Puccini (1893). Film adaptations followed as soon as the medium was invented, beginning with a 1908 silent film adaptation of Puccini's opera. Early adaptations were period films, set in the eighteenth century; later film adaptations translate the novel's story to a contemporary setting.

== Stage adaptations ==
=== Theatre ===
Relatively few of the early theatrical adaptations of Manon Lescaut have survived. There were a few dramas in the eighteenth century and the Romantic period, followed by a larger number in the early twentieth century. The first theatrical adaptation of Manon Lescaut was published in 1772, and first performed in 1782. This was a comedy titled The Virtuous Courtesan, (Note: French: La Courtisane vertueuse) which ends with Manon surviving. It attempted to mix an emotional portrayal of the lovers with some humour, but reviewers found it far inferior to the novel. In 1913, five plays based on Manon Lescaut were scheduled in Paris theatres simultaneously, though the outbreak of World War I prevented them from all being staged.

Although ballets and operas of Manon Lescaut became popular, only three theatrical dramas had even a modest success: The Virtuous Courtesan (1772), Manon Lescaut et le chevalier Desgrieux (1820), and Manon Lescaut (1851). All three include some incidental music, and the 1820 melodrama is also accompanied by a ballet. These adaptations dramatize the narrative in similar ways. Several scenes are consistently included: Manon attending des Grieux's final seminary examination to reunite after his father has separated them; Manon rejecting an Italian prince who seeks her out as a courtesan; and des Grieux desperately burying Manon in Louisiana. In general, theatrical adaptations simplify the plot to one instance of infidelity, a reconciliation, and then the final tragedy, combining Manon's three lovers into just one character. The literary scholar Jean Sgard argues that by reducing the complexity of the narrative, the theatrical adaptations present the lovers as being disproportionately punished for a single mistake, rather than capturing the novel's feeling of a gradual descent into immorality.

=== Opera ===
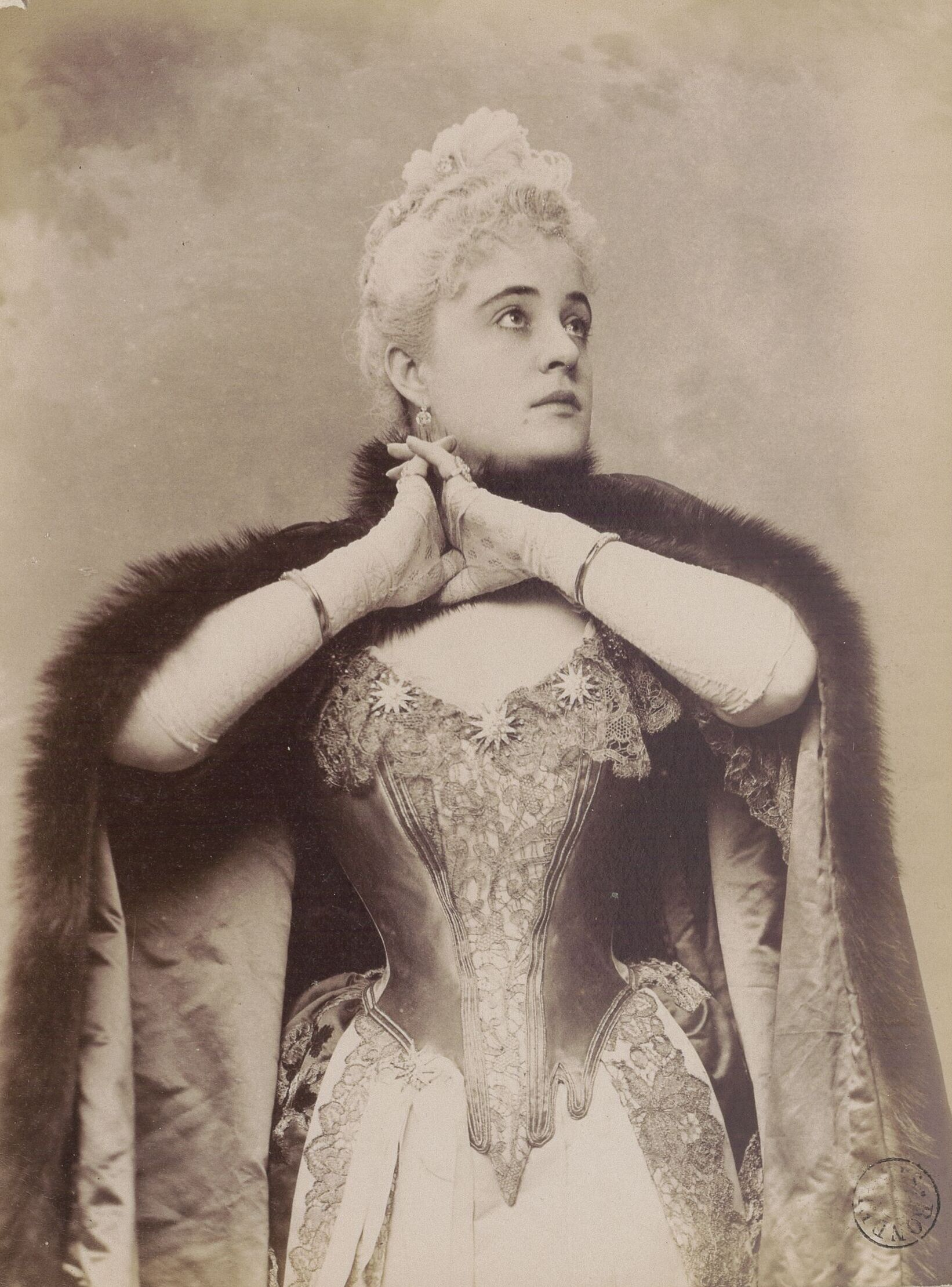
Sibyl Sanderson as Manon for an 1891 production of Jules Massenet's Manon (1884)

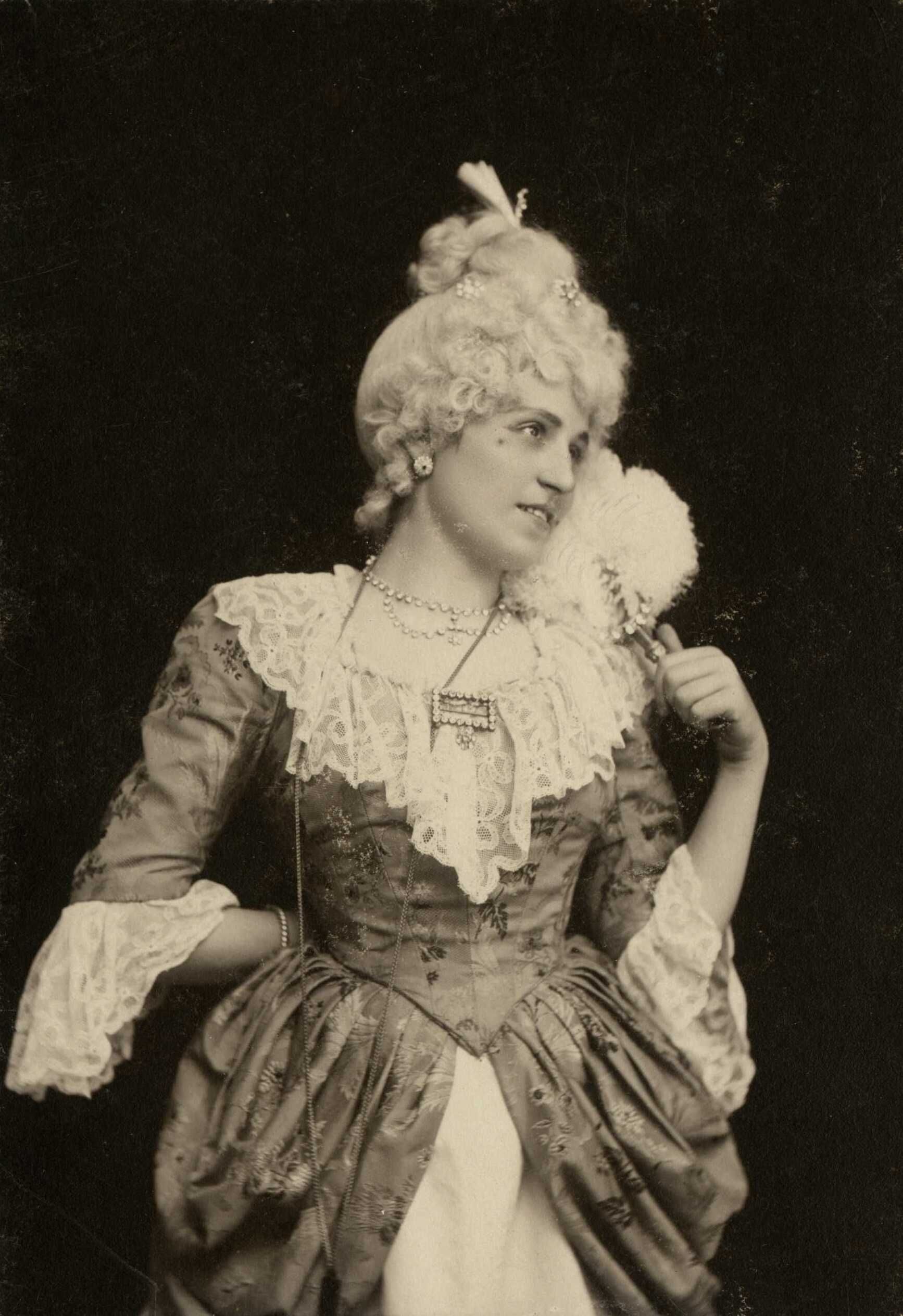
Maria Farneti as Manon for a 1900 production of Giacomo Puccini's Manon Lescaut (1893)

Sgard argues that operatic adaptations came late in the legacy of the novel because the story was incompatible with the eighteenth century's dominant genre of serious opera. The first operatic adaptation in 1836 was not a success. An important change in operatic precedent came after the Italian composer Giuseppe Verdi's popular and influential 1853 opera, La traviata (transl. The Fallen Woman). La traviata is based on the play and novel The Lady of the Camellias by the French writer Alexandre Dumas fils, which are themselves heavily inspired by Manon Lescaut. After 1853, six operas based on Manon Lescaut were written. The most renowned adaptations of Manon Lescaut are the operas by Daniel Auber (1856), Jules Massenet (1884), and Giacomo Puccini (1893).

The operas of Manon Lescaut vary widely in how they adapt the story: the narrative is divided into differing numbers of sections (from three to seven acts), and adaptations exist in the different operatic genres of comic opera, opera, and lyric drama. One opera has Manon miraculously revive after her death scene in Louisiana; another removes the entire American episode and has her die in France. Operatic adaptations also combine Manon's three lovers into just one character. They forgo the novel's long decline to dramatically juxtapose young love and tragic death. Sgard argues that operatic adaptations are forced to focus on a one-note characterization of Manon, (Note: Sgard says: "With opera, you have to choose: Manon will be a bird caught in a trap (Auber), a deviant woman redeeming herself (Verdi), a weak woman searching for herself (Massenet), a free and rebellious woman (Puccini), a being in perdition (Henze)" (French: "Avec l'opéra, il faut choisir: Manon sera donc un oiseau pris au piège (Auber), une dévoyée se rachète (Verdi), une faible femme qui se cherche elle-même (Massenet), une femme libre et révoltée (Puccini), un être en perdition (Henze)")) and each opera's evaluation of her moral character is expressed in its depiction of her death.

=== List of dramas, operas, and ballets ===
- The Virtuous Courtesan (Note: French: La Courtisane vertueuse) (1772), theatrical comedy by César Ribié (Note: In four acts. This play was first published in London and Paris in 1772, and reprinted with the title Manon Lescaut ou la courtisane vertueuse in 1774, but not performed until 1782.)
- Manon Lescaut et le chevalier Desgrieux (1820), melodrama by Étienne Gosse
- Manon Lescaut (1830), ballet-pantomime by Jean-Louis Aumer (Note: Music by Fromental Halevy. First performed at the Paris Opera on 3 May 1830.)
- Manon Lescaut (1830), melodrama by Pierre-Frédéric-Adolphe Carmouche and Frédéric de Courcy
- The Maid of Artois (1836), opera by Irish composer Michael-William Balfe (Note: Libretto by Bunn. First performed at Drury Lane on May 27, 1836, sung by Malibran. Adds a happy ending, in which Manon revives in Louisiana.)
- Manon Lescaut (1846), ballet by Giovanni Casati (Note: Music by Vincenzo Bellini. First staged at Teatro Alla Scalla. Ends with Manon marrying des Grieux rather than dying.)
- Manon Lescaut (1851), drama by Théodore Barrière and Marc Fournier
- Manon Lescaut (1852), ballet by Giovanni Colinelli (Note: Music by Matthias Trebinger)
- Manon Lescaut (1856), opera by French composer Daniel Auber (Note: Comic opera in three acts. Libretto by Eugène Scribe. First performed at the Opéra-Comique.)
- Mademoiselle Manon de l'Escaut (1875), a one-act fantasie by Adolphe Joly
- Manon Lescaut (1883), operetta by A. A. Lopez
- Manon (1884), opera by French composer Jules Massenet (Note: Comic opera in five acts. Libretto by Henri Meilhac and Philippe Gilles. First performed at the Opéra-Comique on January 19, 1884.)
- Manon Lescaut, or the Castle of Lorme (Note: German: Manon Lescaut oder Schloss de Lorme) (1887), opera by Richard Kleinmichel
- Manon Lescaut (1893), opera by Italian composer Giacomo Puccini (Note: Lyric drama in four acts. Libretto by L. Illica, G. Giacosa. M. Praga, R. Leoncavallo, and G. Ricordi. First performed in Turin, February 1, 1893.)
- Histoire de Manon Lescaut (1913), play by French writer Didier Gold
- Manon, fille galante (1924), play by French writers Henry Bataille and Albert Flament (Note: The play was first written around 1908. Performances were planned in 1912, 1913, and 1914, but it was not staged until 1924.)
- Manon Lescaut (1940), drama in verse by Czech poet Vítězslav Nezval (Note: First performed at the D40 theatre, a radical theatre in Prague)
- Boulevard Solitude (1952), opera by German composer Hans Werner Henze (Note: Lyric drama in seven acts. Libretto by Greta Wiel. First performed in Hanover on February 17, 1952.)
- Manon (1974), ballet with music by Jules Massenet and choreography by Kenneth MacMillan (Note: The music by Massenet is not from Massenet's Manon Lescaut, but rather is a selection of his other pieces arranged by Leighton Lucas and Hilda Gaunt.)
- Manon (2015), musical written for the Takarazuka troupe by librettist-director Keiko Ueda and composer Joy Son

== Film adaptations ==
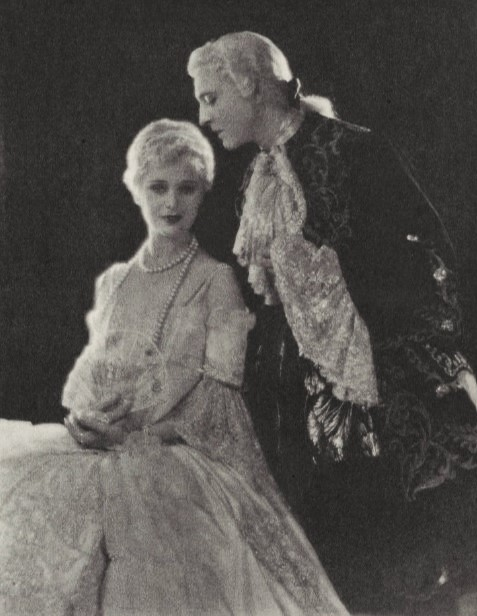
Dolores Costello as Manon and John Barrymore as des Grieux in When a Man Loves (1927)

Manon Lescaut was adapted several times after the invention of film. Six silent films were made, of which nearly all are lost due to the degradation of nitrate film. The first was a 1908 adaptation of Puccini's opera, which used a device called a "cinemofono" to synchronize the film with a music recording. It remained in theaters for a month. The only surviving silent film footage is from the 1920s: about a third of a 1926 film by Arthur Robison has been preserved, as well as the entirety of the 1927 Hollywood adaptation When a Man Loves. According to the literary historian Alan J. Singerman, several early films alter the plot to present Manon as an innocent victim who will be more sympathetic to film audiences than an "amoral and guilty" figure motivated by a "love of luxury and pleasure". He says: "unlike readers of the novel, theater and cinema audiences do not have the intervention of a sympathetic narrator like des Grieux to elicit their indulgence toward the dubious behavior of Prévost's Manon." (Note: French: à l'encontre des lecteurs du roman, le public du théâtre et du cinéma n'a pas l'intervention d'un narrateur complaisant comme Des Grieux pour susciter leur indulgence à l'égard du comportement douteux de la Manon de Prévost.)

Early adaptations were period films, set in the eighteenth century; later film adaptations translate the novel's story to a contemporary setting. The 1949 film Manon by Henri-Georges Clouzot depicts des Grieux as a member of the French Resistance and Manon as a Nazi collaborator; he and Manon enter the black market and eventually stow away to Palestine with a group of Jewish refugees. In Manon 70 by Jean Aurel, released in 1968 and set in the near-future of 1970, des Grieux is a globetrotting radio journalist who tags along with Manon's sugar baby lifestyle; instead of ending with Manon's tragic death, this film concludes with both Manon and des Grieux hitchhiking. In a pair of television miniseries directed by Jean-Xavier de Lestrade in 2014 and 2017, Manon is a non-conformist and occasionally violent young woman in a youth detention center (Note: More specifically, a centre éducatif fermé, a type of French institution used as an alternative to prison for minors) who is failed by social systems and lives precariously.

=== List of films ===
- Manon Lescaut (1908), lost Italian silent film directed by Giovanni Pastrone (Note: Duration of 200 meters)
- Manon Lescaut (1910), lost French silent film directed by A. Calmettes
- Manon Lescaut (1911), lost French silent film directed by A. Capellani
- Manon Lescaut (1914), lost American silent film directed by Herbert Hall Winslow, with Lina Cavalieri and Lucien Muratore
- Manon Lescaut (1926), partly-lost German silent film directed by Arthur Robison, with Lya de Putti and Marlene Dietrich (Note: The original was likely more than 90 minutes; the surviving copy is 28 minutes of a later version with French subtitles)
- When a Man Loves (1927), American silent film directed by Alan Crosland, with John Barrymore and Dolores Costello (Note: Duration of 110 minutes; Vitaphone musical score of Verdi)
- Manon Lescaut (1940), Italian, directed by Carmine Gallone, with Vittorio de Sica and Alida Valli
- La route du bagne (Note: transl. The Path to the Penal Colony) (1945), also titled Manon 326, French, directed by Léon Mathot, with Viviane Romance (Note: Set in the Second French Empire)
- Manon (1949), French, directed by Henri-Georges Clouzot, with Michel Auclair, Cécile Aubry, and Serge Reggiani
- The Lovers of Manon Lescaut (1954), Italian/French co-production, directed by Mario Costa
- Manon 70 (1968), French, directed by Jean Aurel, with Catherine Deneuve, Sami Frey, and Jean-Claude Brialy
- Manon (1981), Japanese, directed by Yōichi Higashi
- Manón (1986), Venezuelan, directed by Román Chalbaud, with Mayra Alejandra
- Manon Lescaut (2013), French television film, directed by Gabriel Aghion, with Samuel Theis
- 3 x Manon (2014) and Manon, 20 years old (Note: French: Manon 20 ans) (2017), French television miniseries by Jean-Xavier de Lestrade
