= Manon Lescaut =

1731 novel by Abbé Prévost

The Story of the Chevalier des Grieux and Manon Lescaut
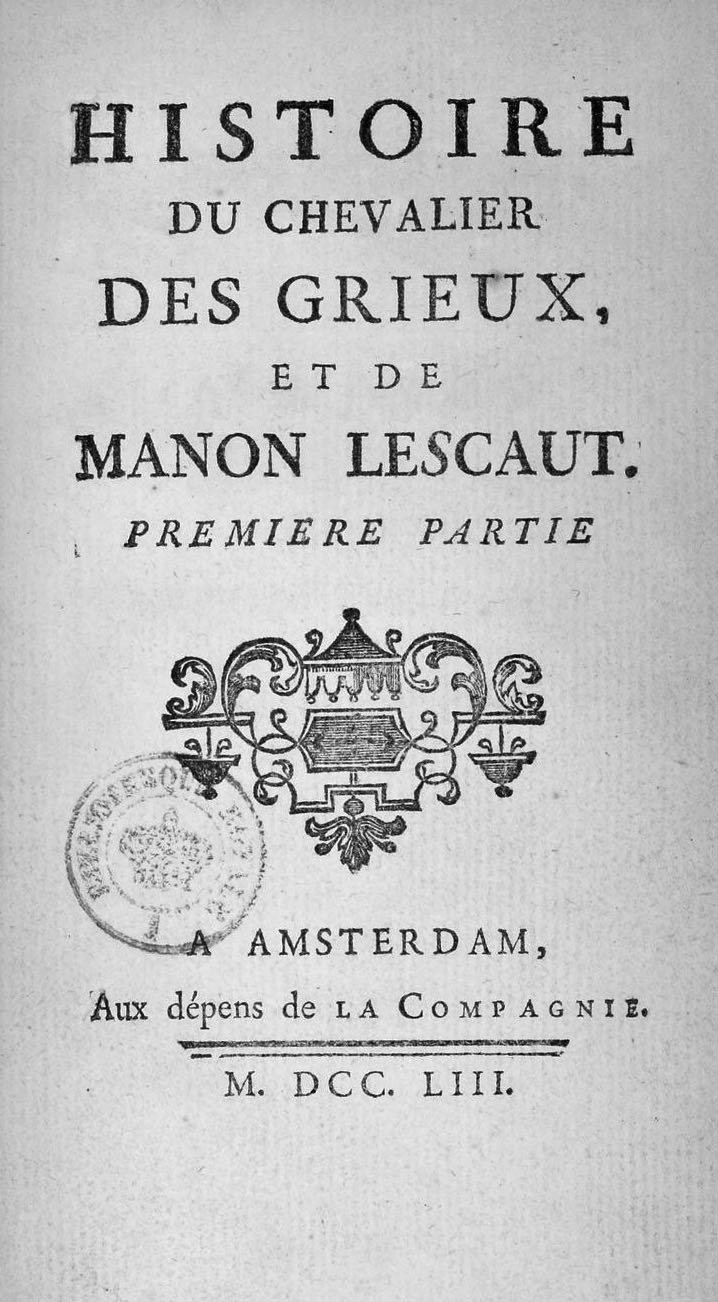
- Title page of the standalone 1753 edition
- Author: Antoine François Prévost
- Original title: Histoire du Chevalier des Grieux, et de Manon Lescaut
- Language: French
- Genre: Récit
- Publication date: 1731
- Publication place: Amsterdam, Netherlands
- Original text: Histoire du Chevalier des Grieux, et de Manon Lescaut at French Wikisource
- Translation: The Story of the Chevalier des Grieux and Manon Lescaut at Wikisource

The Story of the Chevalier des Grieux and Manon Lescaut (Note: French: Histoire du Chevalier des Grieux, et de Manon Lescaut; IPA: [istwaʁ dy ʃ(ə)valje de ɡʁijø e d(ə) manɔ̃ lɛsko]) is a novel by Antoine François Prévost. It tells a tragic love story about a nobleman (known only as the Chevalier (Note: "Chevalier" can be translated as "knight" but in eighteenth century France it was used by nobleman who did not have specific territorial titles, without joining a chivalric order.) des Grieux) and a common woman (Manon Lescaut). Their decision to live together without marriage is the start of a moral decline that also leads to gambling, fraud, theft, murder, and Manon's death as a deportee in New Orleans.

The story was first published in 1731 as the final volume of Prévost's serial novel Memoirs and Adventures of a Man of Quality. (Note: French: Mémoires et aventures d'un homme de qualité) In 1733, all copies for sale in Paris were seized due to the volume's morally questionable content. This effective ban contributed to an increase in popularity, prompting unauthorized reprints. In 1753, Prévost published Manon Lescaut as a revised standalone book, which is now the most commonly reprinted version.

The novel was unusual for depicting Paris's "low life" and for discussing the lovers' money problems in numerical detail: both choices contribute to its realism and its aura of scandal. The story is narrated retroactively by des Grieux, an early example of the French genre of the confessional récit. Over the centuries, audiences have judged the character Manon differently. Eighteenth-century audiences saw her as an unworthy figure who inspired pity due to the sincerity of her love. Nineteenth-century responses saw her as a nearly mythological sex symbol, either a femme fatale who corrupts des Grieux or a hooker with a heart of gold. Today, scholars tend to see Manon as a victim of broader social forces, who is misrepresented by des Grieux's narration of her experience.

The novel is regarded as a classic, and in 1991 it was the most reprinted novel in French literature, with over 250 editions over the preceding 260 years. It has frequently been adapted into plays, ballets, films, and particularly operas. The most renowned adaptations are the operas Manon Lescaut by Daniel Auber (1856), Manon by Jules Massenet (1884), and Manon Lescaut by Giacomo Puccini (1893).

== Plot summary ==
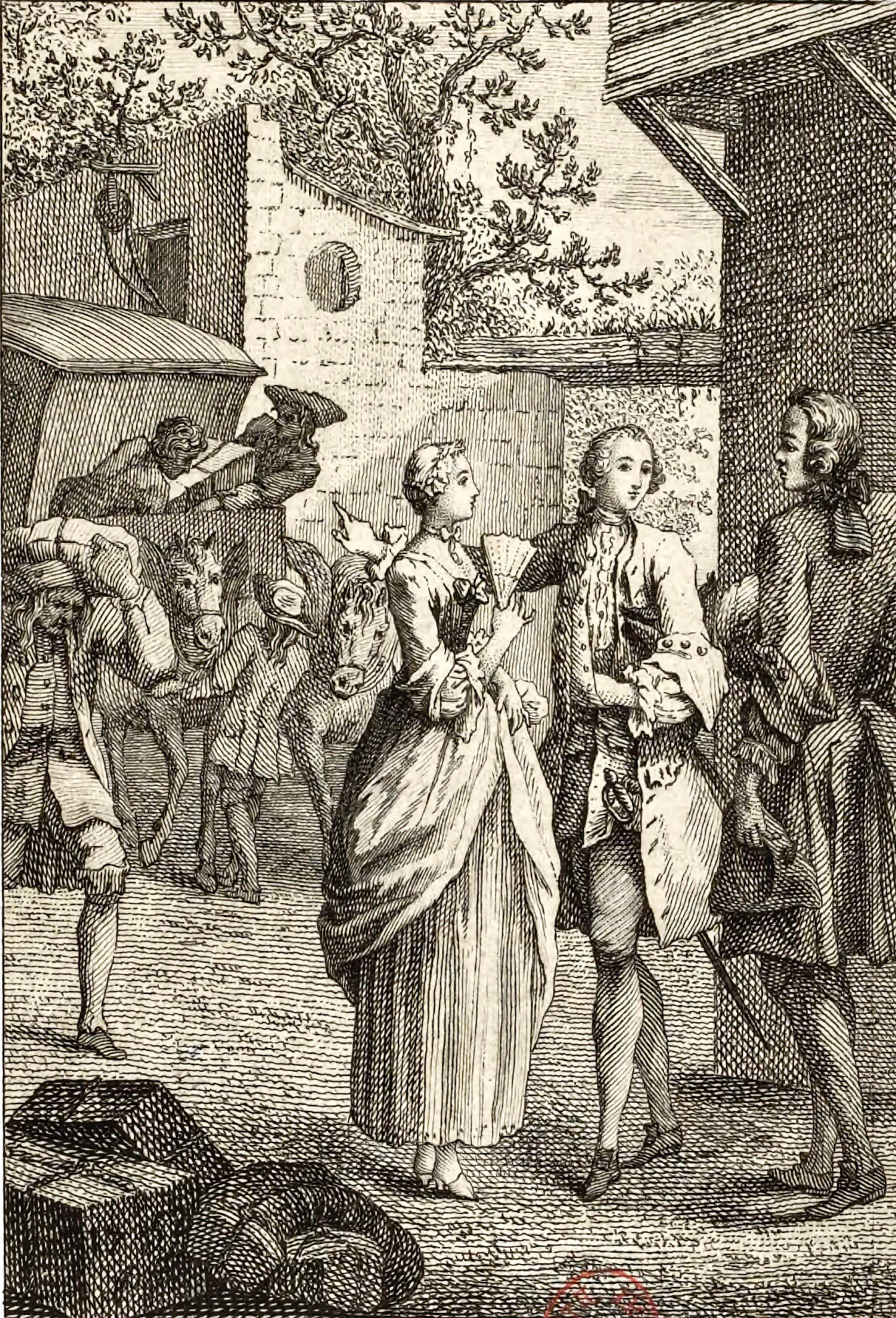
Manon and des Grieux's first meeting, illustrated in the 1753 edition.

The seventeen-year-old Chevalier des Grieux, a seminary student and the younger son of a noble family, falls in love at first sight with Manon, a fifteen-year-old of common birth on her way to a convent. They immediately run away together, and spend their meagre savings living pleasurably in Paris. As they run low on funds, Manon has sex with a Monsieur de B—— (Note: This character name is blanked out in the original text. Starting in the early eighteenth century, salacious narratives based on real gossip (known as "secret histories") were published with the names of key figures partially blanked (or "disemvowelled") to avoid accusations of libel. Novels often presented themselves as authentic memoirs because fiction was not well respected; to enhance the illusion, they blanked the names of fictional characters.) for money; des Grieux forgives her. M. de B—— alerts des Grieux's family to his location, and des Grieux is forcibly brought home and confined to his room. Eventually, he enters St. Sulpice seminary with his friend Tiberge and spends a year as a successful student.

Manon reappears, and des Grieux abandons his plans to become a priest. Using wealth that Manon stole from M. de B——, they move to Chaillot. Their house burns down, and des Grieux begins to cheat gamblers for money. Their servants rob them, and Manon agrees to become the mistress of a Monsieur G—— M——. After accepting substantial gifts, she leaves his house while he awaits her in his bedroom. He has Manon and des Grieux arrested. Des Grieux is sent to St. Lazare (a religious institution for genteel moral correction), and Manon to La Salpêtrière (a harsh prison for "fallen women"). Des Grieux breaks out of his confinement, accidentally killing a porter during his escape, then bribes guards to smuggle Manon out of hers.

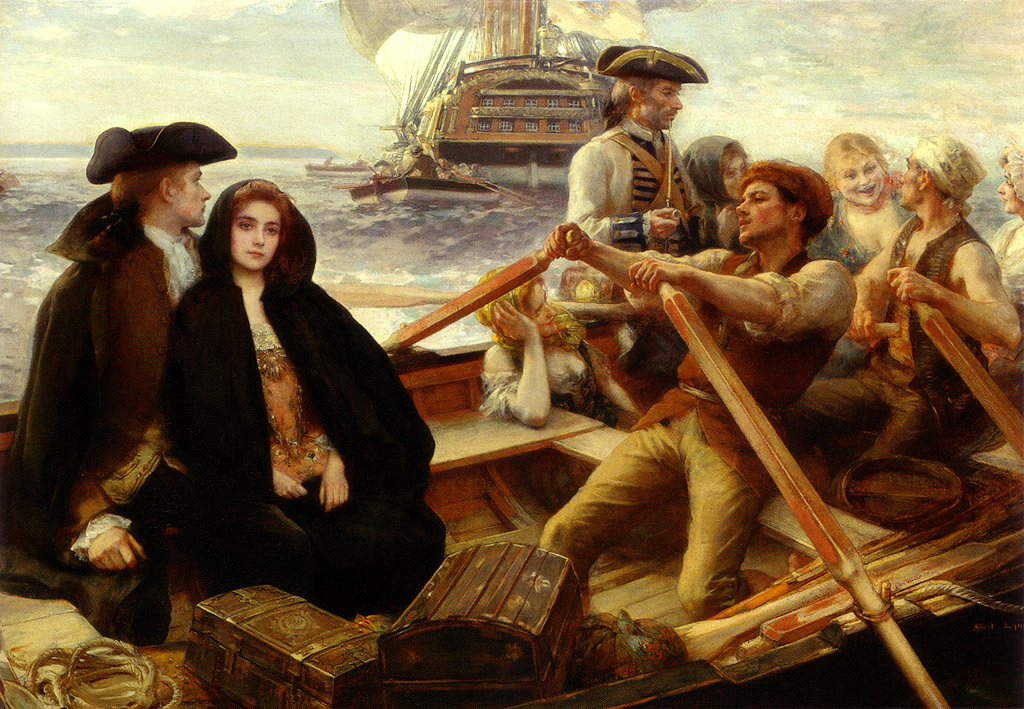
Manon Lescaut and Her Lover, Des Grieux, Are Set Ashore in Louisiana (1896), by Albert Lynch

They return to Chaillot. Des Grieux borrows money from Tiberge. Manon rejects the advances of an Italian prince. They meet a young G—— M——, son of the G—— M—— whom they had earlier deceived, and decide to defraud him the same way. Manon receives his money and jewels; des Grieux hires thugs to detain him for a night; at his house, the couple eat his dinner and are about to sleep in his bed when his father arrives and has them arrested. They are imprisoned in the Petit Châtelet; des Grieux is freed by his father's influence, and Manon is deported to New Orleans as a correction girl.

Des Grieux accompanies Manon to America, pretending they are married. After some time living in idyllic peace, des Grieux asks the Governor, Étienne Perier, to officially wed him to Manon. The Governor instead decides to give Manon to his nephew, Synnelet. Des Grieux duels Synnelet and knocks him unconscious; thinking he has killed the man, the couple flee into the wilderness. Manon dies of exposure and des Grieux buries her, digging her grave with his broken sword. Heartbroken, he is taken back to France by Tiberge and returns to his aristocratic life.

== Composition and publication ==
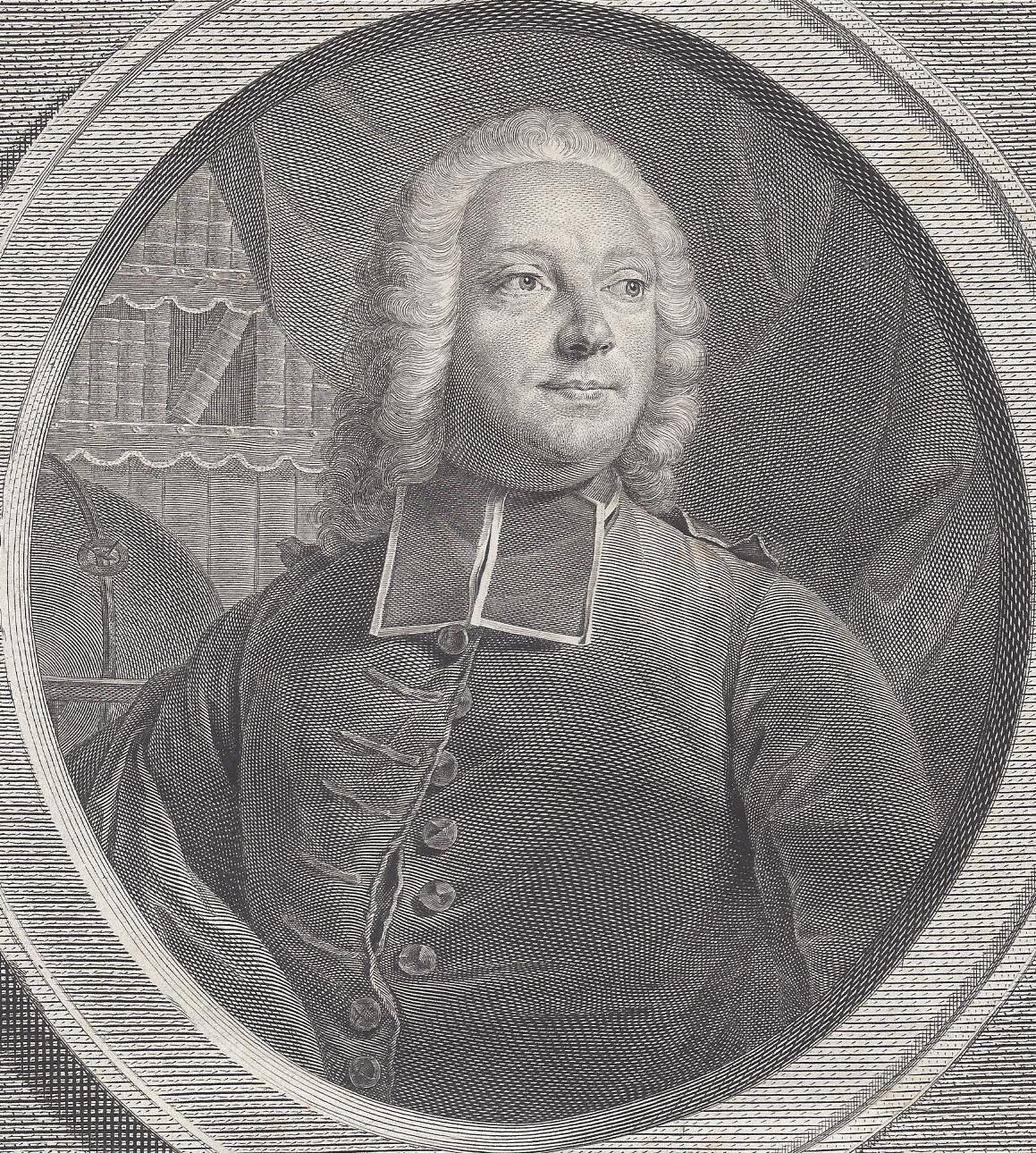
Antoine François Prévost in 1745

Antoine François Prévost was a French priest and author. In the 1710s he moved multiple times between a career in the military and a novitiate in the Jesuit priesthood. He joined the Benedictines of St Maur after an unhappy love affair, which has sometimes contributed to speculation that Manon Lescaut has autobiographical inspirations. In 1728, while a monk in Paris, he published the first two volumes of his serial novel Memoirs and Adventures of a Man of Quality, Who Withdrew from the World. (Note: French: Mémoires et aventures d'un homme de qualité, qui s'est retiré du monde) He then left his abbey without permission, and his superiors gained a lettre de cachet for his arrest. He fled to England. While he was in exile, volumes three and four were published in Paris.

In 1730, he moved to the Netherlands and signed a contract with the Compagnie des Libraires d'Amsterdam for three more volumes of Memoirs and Adventures. Prévost likely composed Manon Lescaut in March and April 1731. At the time, he was in Amsterdam, and was writing quickly to satisfy his contract. The literary historian R. A. Francis argues that Manon Lescaut was added to his ongoing novel as "an afterthought, determined by commercial reasons." It was first published in May 1731, as volume seven of Memoirs and Adventures, alongside volumes five and six. Beginning in 1733, the Compagnie des Libraires d'Amsterdam also published volume seven on its own, as it proved more popular than the rest of the series.

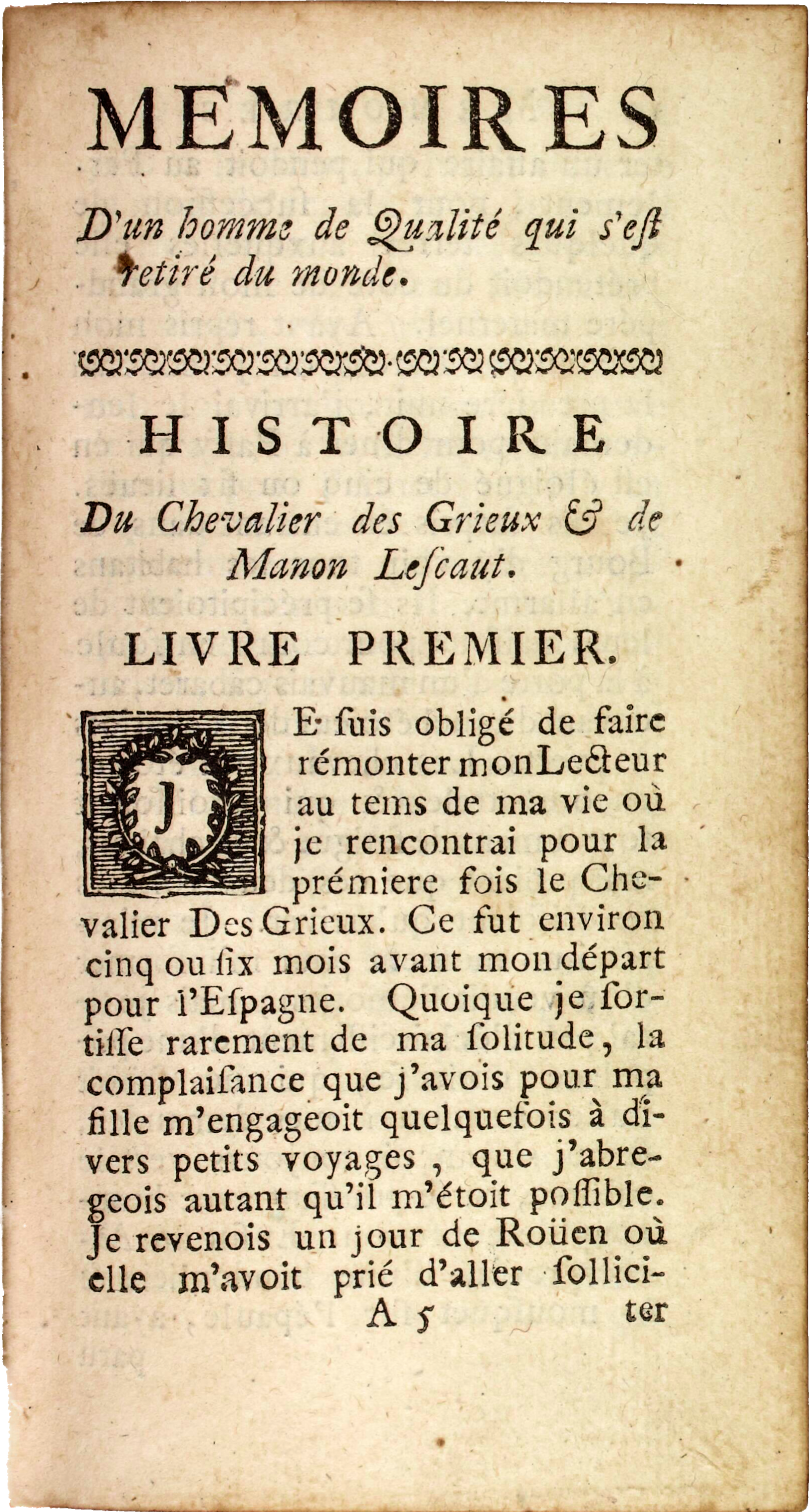
First page of the original 1731 version, as volume seven of Mémoires et aventures

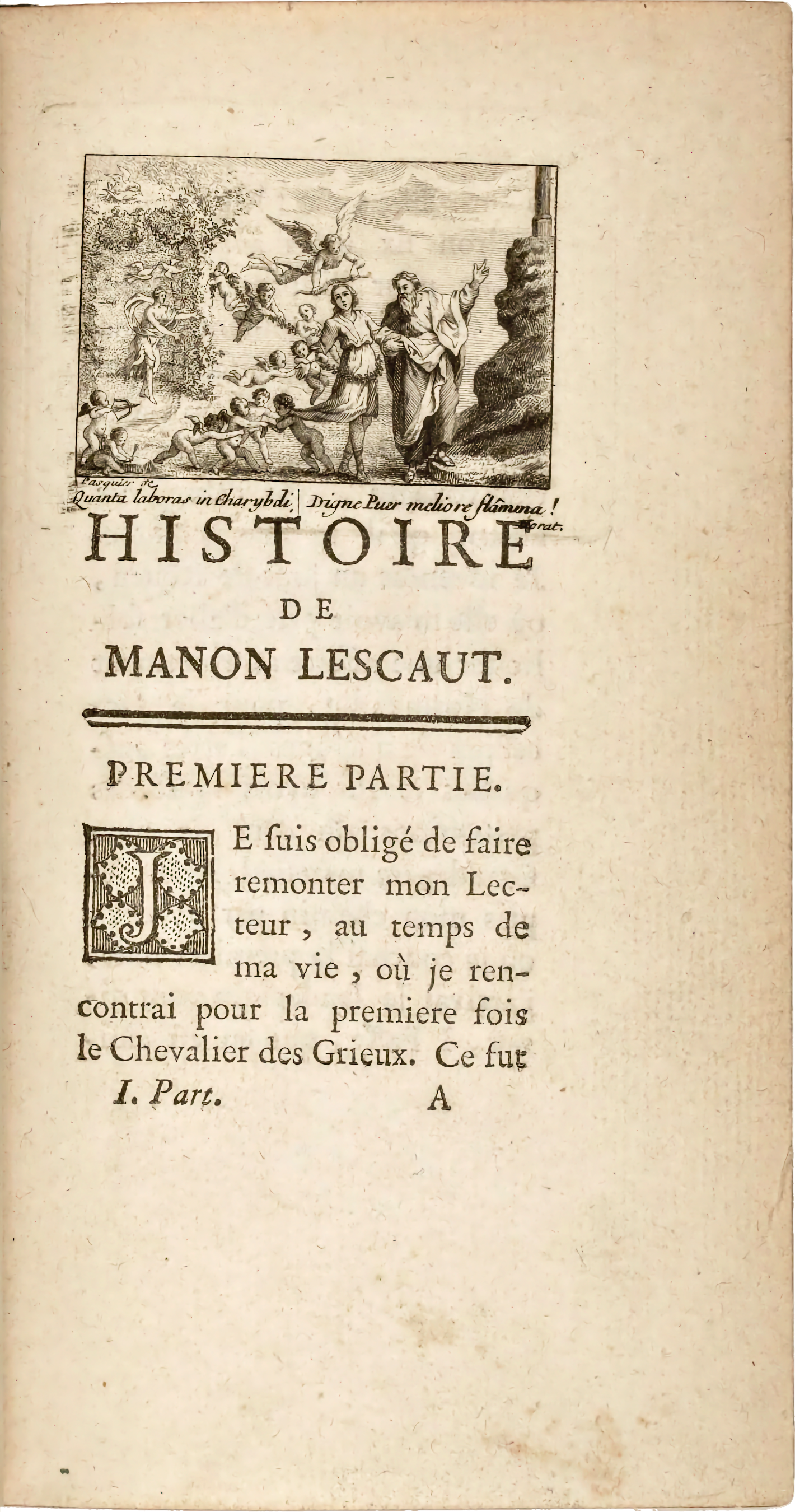
First page of the 1753 revised and illustrated edition

In 1753, Prévost published a substantially revised edition of volume seven as a standalone work. This book was titled The Story of the Chevalier des Grieux and of Manon Lescaut, (Note: French: Histoire du Chevalier des Grieux et de Manon Lescaut) which was the subtitle of volume seven. This edition claimed on its title page to be published in Amsterdam by the Compagnie des Libraires, but was actually published in Paris by François Didot. In his revision, Prévost used more euphemistic language for some of the more vulgar moments, added a new scene where Manon resists the seduction of an Italian prince, and rewrote the ending to replace religious references with a more secular morality. Manon Lescaut is the only novel for which Prévost published a revised edition. The 1753 version of the novel is usually the basis of modern editions. This edition also added nine illustrations, which made the book into more of a luxury object, and also made it more challenging to pirate.

== Style ==
The narrative of Manon Lescaut is set apart from the main events of Memoirs and Adventures with a preface and a preamble, both ostensibly written by the unnamed "man of quality" who is the protagonist of the main novel. The preface, titled "Note from the author" (French: Avis de l'Auteur), explains that the story was too large to include within the main narrative. It also says the story will be a morally-instructive example for readers, who will learn not to imitate des Grieux. In the preamble, the narrator witnesses a group of prostitutes being deported. Curious about a particularly beautiful one (Manon), he speaks with the lover travelling with her (des Grieux). Two years later, he encounters des Grieux again, and asks to hear the full story of his experience in America.

The story is thus narrated retroactively as a long speech, delivered by des Grieux nine months after Manon's death. As such, it is an early example of the French genre of the confessional récit. All events are recounted in the first person, and the primary verb tense is passé simple, a past-tense form that is only used in formal written French. The novel does not use quotation marks, even when des Grieux relates what other characters have said, which blurs the boundaries between characters' speech and free indirect speech. Des Grieux's telling frequently interrupts the narrative with apostrophes to absent figures and expressions of intense emotion. When he describes Manon, he often stutters or struggles to find words. Prévost was praised for this informal and expressive style, which invited sympathetic emotion: according to the literary historian Sylviane Albertan-Coppola, "[t]he words flow as the heart overflows; the flow of feelings goes hand in hand with the flow of writing". (Note: French: "Les mots coulent comme déborde le cœur; le flot des sentiments ca de pair avec le flux de l'écriture")

Des Grieux is often considered a partly unreliable narrator, whose telling of the story is shaped by his retrospective self-justifications. The scholar R.A. Francis describes some of des Grieux's explanations as "so outrageous that it is hard to imagine them being taken seriously", such as his claim that cheating at cards is morally acceptable because God has made his rich opponents gullible to allow the poor to rectify wealth inequality. According to the literary scholar Lionel Gossman, the layered frame narratives create a general ambiguity of meaning: the narrator tells us what des Grieux told him that Manon told him she thought, and no one is able to achieve certainty about the final "moral" of Manon's life.

Structurally, the novel follows a pattern of repetition and intensification, as similar plot elements recur with slight variations. For example, five different men who are wealthier or more powerful than des Grieux attempt to supplant him in his relationship with Manon. Each time, des Grieux's response is more active and less innocent.

== Major themes ==
=== Tragic love ===
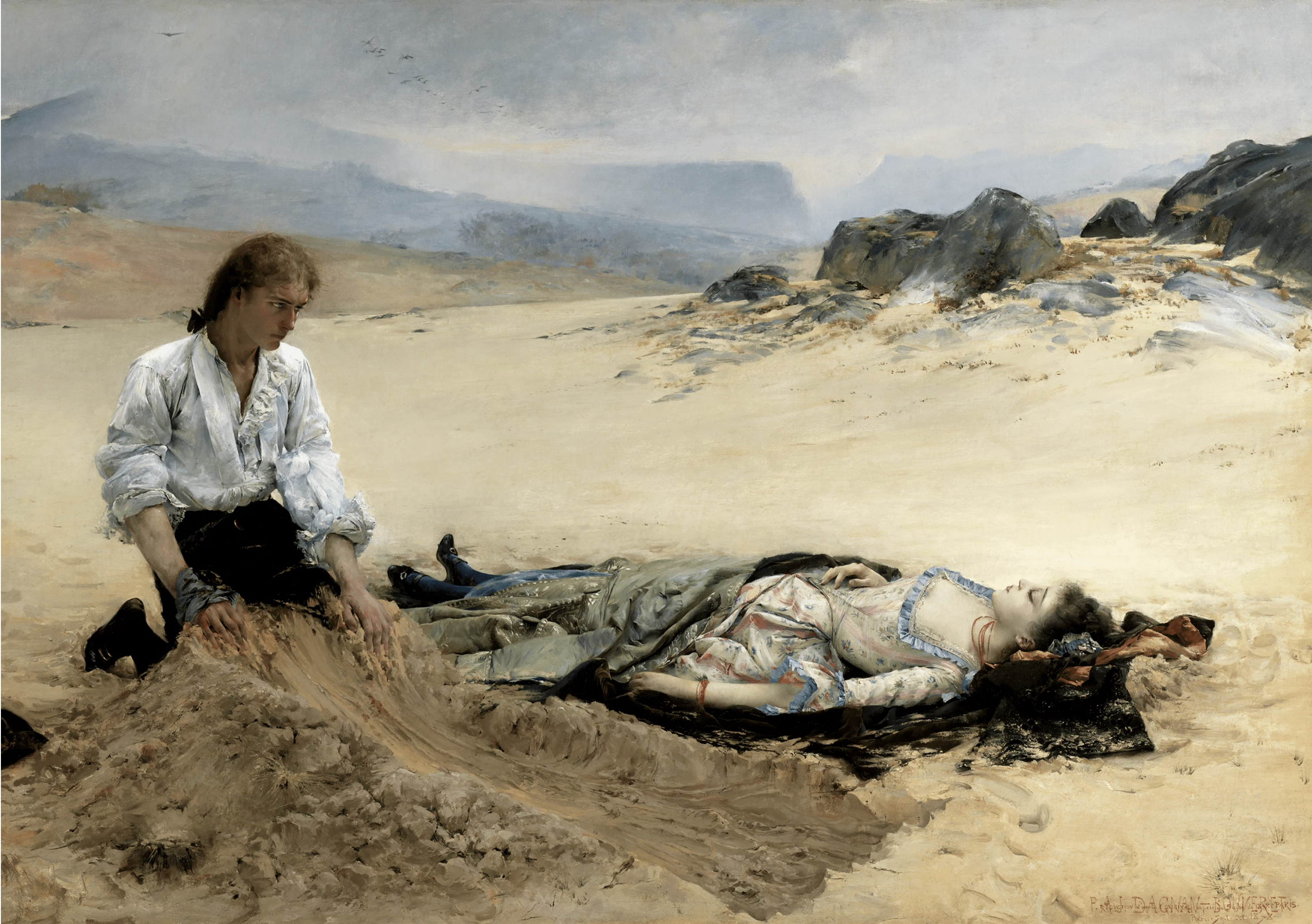
The Burial of Manon Lescaut (1878), by Pascal Dagnan-Bouveret

The story is particularly remembered for its tragic lovers, with des Grieux and Manon being compared to Romeo and Juliet and Tristan and Iseult. The scholar Jean Sgard argues that all of Prévost's writing, including Manon Lescaut, is ultimately about "the impossibility of happiness, the pervasiveness of evil and the misfortune attaching to the passions", all of which lead to "mourning without end". According to R.A. Francis, Prévost is a fundamentally pessimistic writer, who "regarded the flaws of society as inevitable consequences of the flaws of human nature, with little hope of putting them right."

It is an early example of the emerging sentimental novel, in which love can justify anything, and important moral value is placed on strong emotion. Francis argues that eighteenth-century readers were particularly likely to be persuaded by the interpretation that des Grieux's intense love "reveals the greatness of his soul and thus cleanses him of the stains which deeds such as his might leave on a lesser man." Eighteenth-century readers also saw Manon and des Grieux as helpless, fated to their tragic ending. The crimes of both were equally justified by their love and their financial need.

=== Scandalizing immorality ===
On the novel's first publication, the characters and their choices were seen as shockingly immoral. Des Grieux's rejection of the priesthood in favour of a sexual relationship without marriage, and his crimes of fraud and murder, challenged readers' expectations of acceptable actions for the hero of a novel. Manon's willingness to have sex for money, and her general taste for pleasure and luxury, also seemed irreconcilable with her narrative role as a sympathetic love object. Both were sometimes seen as corrupted characters, and the novel's realistic depiction of Paris's "low life" was unusual and potentially threatening. The scandal was intensified by the historical setting of the novel: the story appears to be set between 1712 and 1717, so it takes place during the final years of Louis XIV's conservative and orderly reign and the start of the regency of King Louis XV, rather than fully during the 8 year long Regency, when stories of corruption would be less surprising.

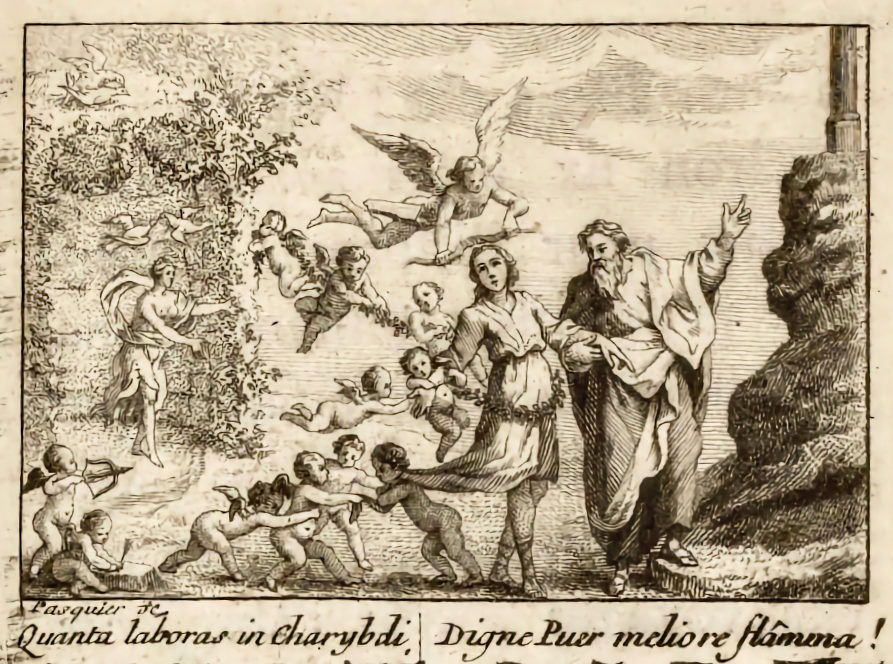
First-page illustration from the 1753 edition, showing a young man undecided at a crossroads between vice and virtue.

Although the preface claims to disavow the characters' misbehavior, this is often seen as an insincere pretense. The revised 1753 edition added an allegorical vignette on the first page which also attempted to frame the novel as a moral story. It depicts a Christian version of Hercules at the crossroads, a stock allegory for the choice between vice and virtue. The caption, "what torments you endure in Charybdis, young man worthy of a nobler love", aligns Manon with vice; the deadly mythological whirlpool Charybdis was a common metaphor for prostitutes who would "ruin" noble young men. The image thus suggests that the novel will be a story of temptation and suffering, but one in which piety will prevail. However, the effect of the novel on readers often fails to follow this moral rejection of Manon's temptations; according to the literary scholar Lionel Gossman, "[r]eaders have always wondered whether [the story] illustrates the glory of passion or its misery ... whether the model is des Griuex in love or des Grieux apparently grown wise and repentant," especially since des Grieux himself is often inconsistent. The literary historian Rori Bloom declares, "he promises moral instruction and delivers amorality." R. A. Francis states that there are "no agreed answers" to core questions about the interpretation of the novel: "Should the two lovers ... be treated with the indulgence that Des Grieux as narrator seeks to inspire for them, or are they merely criminals? Does Prévost seriously intend the work to be read as a moral tale, or is it merely a titillating entertainment?"

=== Social rank and money ===
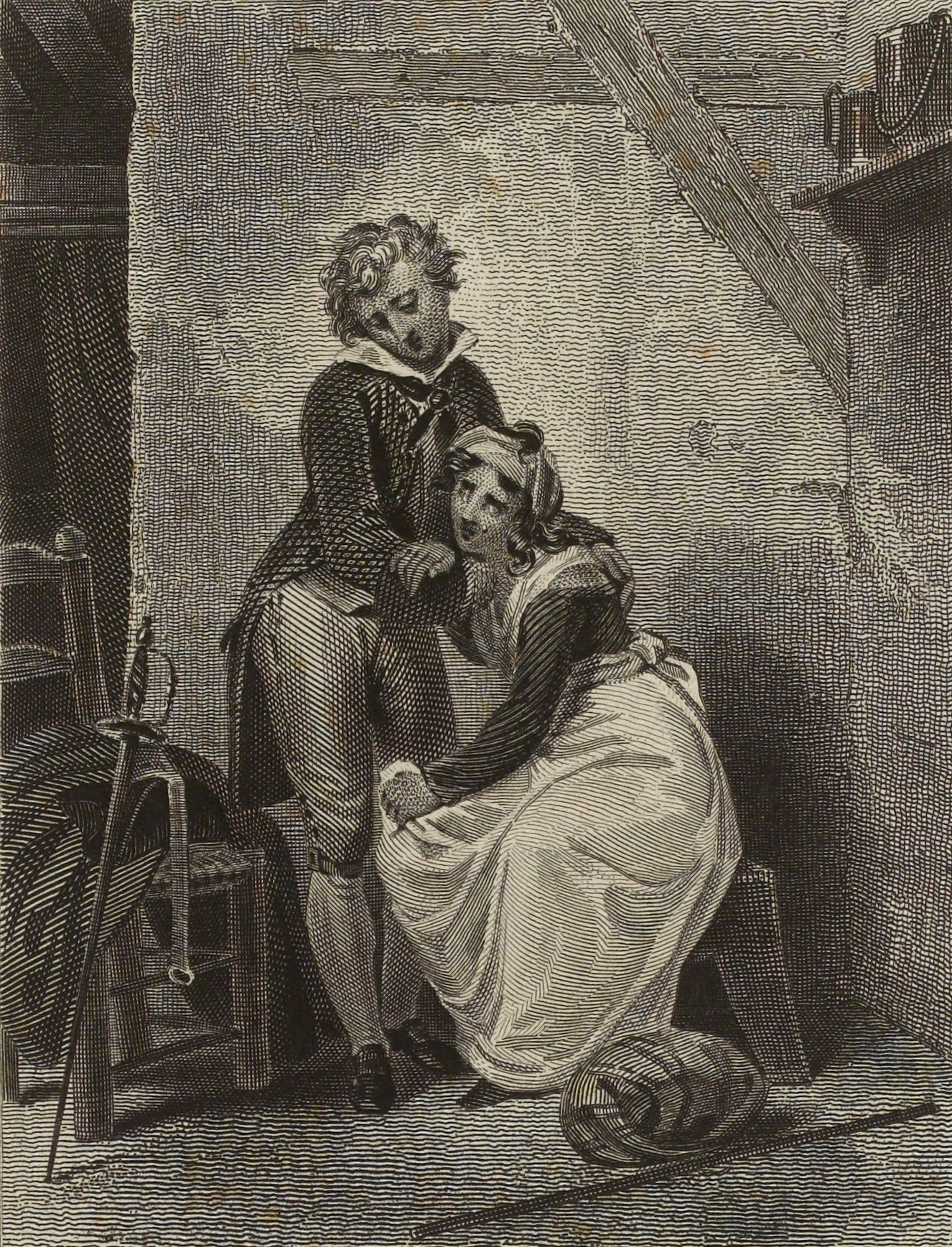
1827 engraving of Manon crying, consoled by des Grieux, during one of their stints of poverty

The novel is unusual in the French tradition for its detailed depiction of lower-class locations and activities, especially the criminal world. Manon is considered France's first fictional heroine to be a commoner, and the gulf in social rank between her and the noble des Grieux is an obstacle to their love. Des Grieux and Manon sometimes struggle to understand each other due to their different backgrounds. For example, Manon does not understand why des Grieux is surprised and upset after she acquires money from other lovers; she sees these as practical affairs, which do not threaten her love for des Grieux. Their difference in rank is also apparent in the different punishments they receive for their transgressions. When both lovers are imprisoned for some of their crimes, des Grieux's aristocratic status shields him from the worst consequences while Manon ends up deported. Des Grieux often finds that even complete strangers will help him, if they share his aristocratic background. The novel thus highlights how justice is enforced unequally for different ranks of society.

A distinct and even greater challenge is their lack of money. Manon Lescaut is often highlighted as the first French novel to treat money as a major theme. Exact numbers are provided throughout the novel, an unusual choice that contributes to the novel's realism. Manon begins the novel with a dowry of 300 livres, which is less than a tenth of an ordinary dowry for a woman entering a convent. Des Grieux has only the 150 livres in his pocket, and no way to earn more. (Note: For context, the annual salary for a servant (Manon and de Grieux each keep one) was 100 livres, while Manon and de Grieux consider a "respectable but simple" income to be 6,000 livres per year. The financial gap between the lovers and their servants is large, but the gap between them and their patrons is even larger: two of Manon's lovers offer her 20,000 and 30,000 livres as annual spending money.) As an aristocrat, he is barred from ordinary employment; he could earn a professional income in the church, the military, or the law, but only if he still had his father's support. The literary scholar Haydn Mason describes the novel's setting as "a harsh and sordid world, motivated almost universally by money". Although the book depicts its protagonists as suffering due to their poverty, it is not a populist novel that advocates for social reform. Instead, the novel responds to their struggles with sadness and resignation.

== Reception ==
Manon Lescaut gained popularity gradually. When first published in 1731 as volume seven of Memoirs and Adventures, des Grieux and Manon's story was not considered a separate work from the rest of the novel. Over the next few years, it was increasingly seen as a highlight of that novel. Reviewers praised the novel as a whole, especially for its success inducing tears. Memoirs and Adventures sold well in Holland and England on its first release, and a 1732 German translation was also successful, but it was largely ignored in France until 1733.

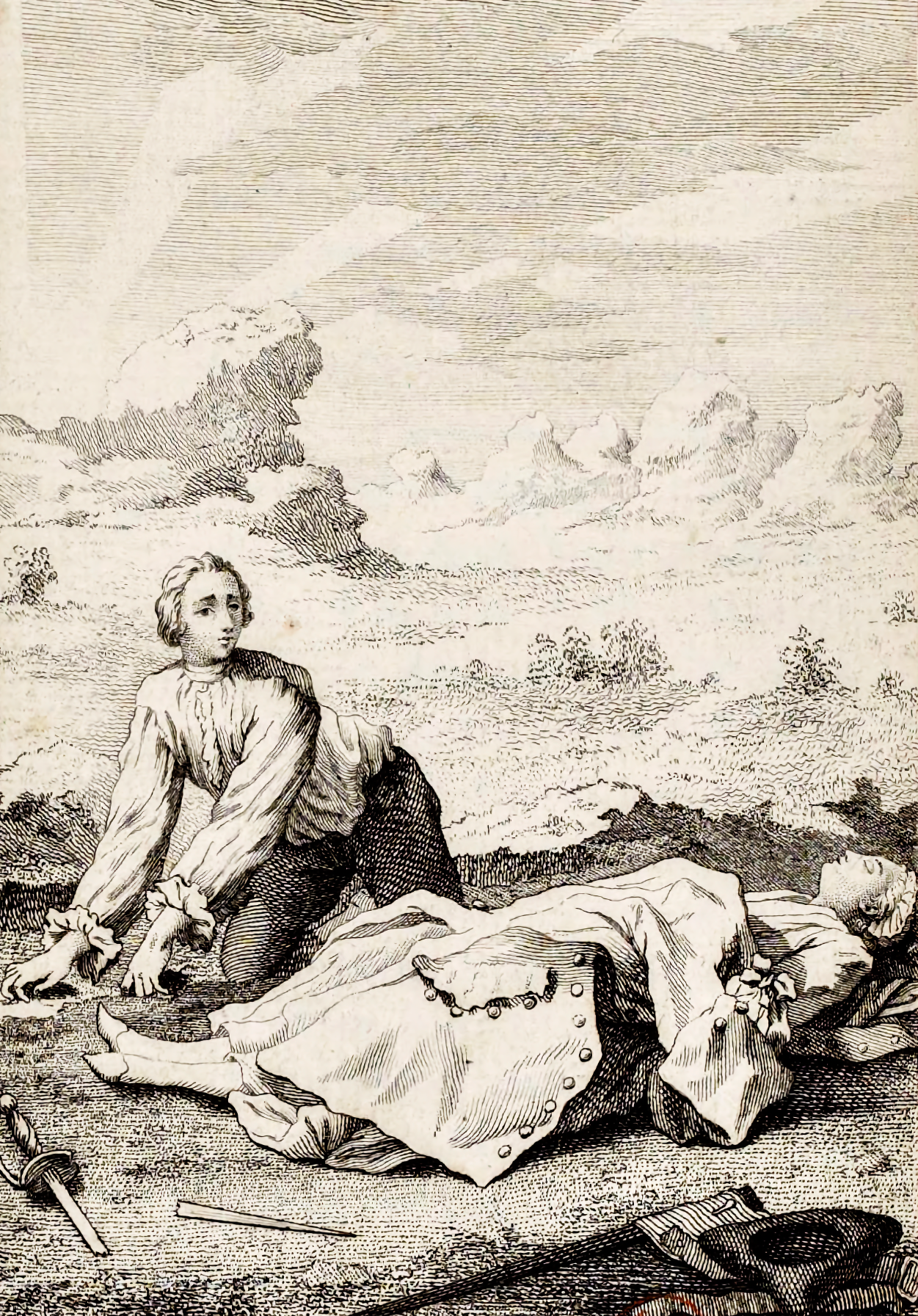
Illustration from the 1753 edition of Manon Lescaut, published in response to popular unauthorized reprints of the volume

In July 1733, the release of standalone edition of Manon Lescaut prompted a review in the clandestine Journal de la Cour et de Paris, which brought it to the attention of many new readers, including the famous author Voltaire. On October 5, the French censors (who needed to approve all new publications) seized the copies currently for sale due to the book's morally questionable content. (Note: According to the Journal de la Cour et de Paris, the book was seized because "Besides the fact that people are made to play roles that are unworthy of them, vice and excess are depicted in ways that do not give enough horror." (French: Outre que l'on y fait jouer agens en place des roles peu dignes d'eux, le vice et le debordement y sont peints avec des traits qui n'en donnent pas assez d'horreur.)) This effective ban led to a sudden increase in popularity. As part of this new popularity, Manon Lescaut was printed separately from Memoirs and Adventures several more times, including in unauthorized reprints. In 1753, Prévost responded with a high-quality revised edition of Manon Lescaut as a self-contained novel. Both Memoirs and Adventures and the standalone Manon Lescaut were reprinted frequently, with twenty editions of the first and eight of the latter appearing between 1731 and Prévost's death in 1763.

Interest in the novel waned at the start of the nineteenth century, followed by another dramatic increase in popularity in 1830, when it was adapted as a ballet. Many further adaptations followed, with new reprints of Manon Lescaut each year. In the late nineteenth century, editions were released with prefaces written by the famous French authors Alexandre Dumas fils in 1875, Anatole France in 1878, and Guy de Maupassant in 1885. Adaptations, especially into opera, had a major influence on the novel's legacy; according to the literary historian Alan J. Singerman, by the twentieth century the operatic version was more widely known than the novel. (Note: He writes: "Massenet's Manon, like Puccini's no doubt, was known to a wider public in the first quarter of the twentieth century than Prévost's novel." French: la Manon de Massenet, comme celle sans doute de Puccini, fut connue d'un plus large public, dans le premier quart du vingtième siècle, que le roman de Prévost.) Over time, the novel came to be regarded as a historical classic. In 1991 it was the most reprinted novel in French literature, with over 250 editions over the preceding 260 years.

=== Responses to the character of Manon ===
Since the novel's first publication, substantial critical analysis has focused on the interpretation of Manon's character. Because Manon's words and actions are always related through the filter of des Grieux's retrospective storytelling, readers can only speculate about her real thoughts, feelings, and intentions. In the words of the literary scholar Lionel Gossman, "Manon is constantly reborn and reinvented in the minds of generations of readers, none of whom can claim to possess her finally or determine who she really is."

The earliest reviews in 1733 saw Manon as sympathetic, but unexpectedly so. R.A. Francis says: "The standard novel heroine in the generations preceding Prévost was a princess pure as driven snow, and Prévost's originality is to have Des Grieux apply language appropriate to such a princess to a girl of much lower birth and dubious moral standards, leaving the reader to decide how appropriate this language is." Eighteenth-century audiences described her as an unworthy "whore" (French: catin) who was nonetheless appealing due to the sincerity of her love for des Grieux. She was both blamed and forgiven for des Grieux's corruption. The illustrations in the 1753 edition reinforced the image of Manon as someone to be loved, pitied, and forgiven for her mistakes.

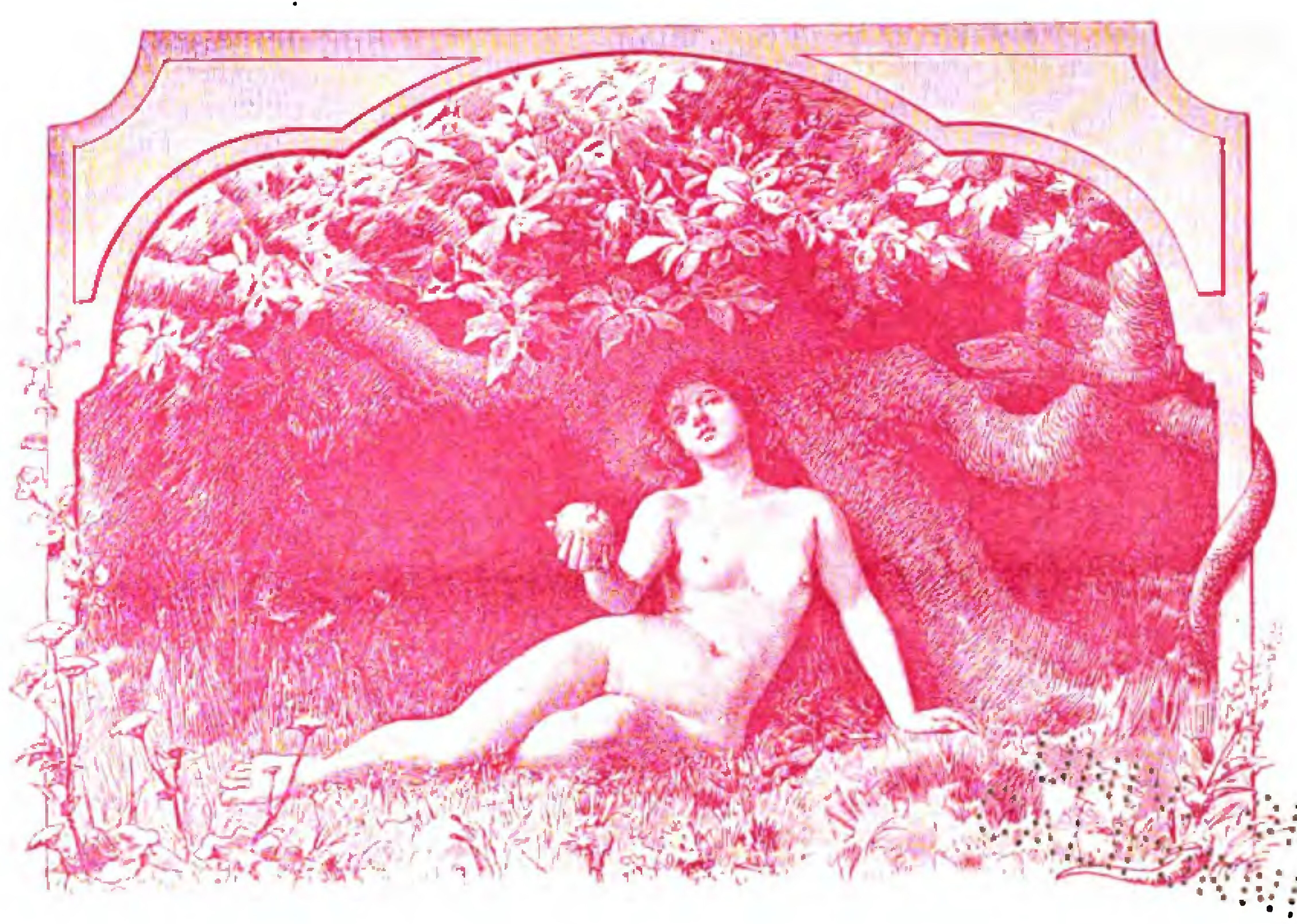
1886 illustration of Manon as Eve

Manon's reputation began to change in the nineteenth century, as she became a near-mythological figure, and an archetype of feminine beauty. Rather than being a simple, lighthearted girl of common birth, she was depicted as either a femme fatale who destroys des Grieux, or as a hooker with a heart of gold who is redeemed through her death. In 1832, Alfred de Musset's poem Namouna described Manon as "an astonishing sphinx, a true siren, a thrice feminine heart". Alexandre Dumas fils, whose novel The Lady of the Camellias (1848) was heavily inspired by Manon Lescaut, wrote of Manon: "you are sensuality, you are instinct, you are pleasure, the eternal temptation of man". Adaptations like the popular opera Manon (1884) characterized Manon as powerfully seductive. The literary historian Naomi Segal summarizes this period as one in which most critics "tend to view Manon as if she were a real woman and to heap upon her all the myths which operate within sexual politics in the non-fictional world".

Twentieth-century scholarly interpretations tend to see Manon as the victim, not of her own weakness, but of various social systems. For these readers, des Grieux's version of events is considered suspect, and it is important to imagine how Manon might have narrated her story differently. Feminist theorists like Nancy K. Miller and Segal see Manon as a narrative victim of patriarchy. Cultural-historical theorists see the novel as a conflict between aristocratic and bourgeois ideologies; Manon is marginalized by her class, but makes savvy decisions to strategically ensure her survival. A post-structuralist reading of the novel aligns Manon with the sign, inherently elusive in meaning. Outside of academia, modern readers sometimes find Manon underdeveloped as a character. Twenty-first century adaptations reinforced a sociological interpretation of Manon's character. Several adaptations translate the story to more recent time periods in French history, in which Manon is always a non-conformist who boldly pursues love despite disadvantaged circumstances.

== Legacy ==
=== Literary impact ===
According to the literary scholar English Showalter, Prévost "set a style for the whole century" with the novel's emphasis on regretful retrospective tales narrated from confinement: "Dozens of fictional narrators preface their works by explaining that they hope the story of their own errors and misfortunes will serve as a guide to others." R.A. Francis compares des Grieux's retrospective narration to that of La Vie de Marianne (1731–1745), and identifies Adolphe (1816), Carmen (1845), and the works of André Gide as further successors. Showalter also says that Prévost's "globetrotting characters," who "dash about the world," inspired subsequent French novelists to depict expansive global travel.

Manon Lescaut is credited with inspiring numerous nineteenth-century novels centred on the trope of the fallen woman. In 1875, Jules Barbey d'Aurevilly wrote that "Abbé Prévost’s Manon spawned the other Manons with which contemporary literature abounds. Manon Lescaut was the generative atom of these loose women that swarm within it, like a plague of Egypt". (Note: French: "La Manon de l'abbé Prévost a pondu les autres Manons dont regorge la littérature actuelle. Manon Lescaut a été l'atome générateur de ces drôlesses qui y pullulent, comme une plaie d'Egypte") Novels influenced by Manon include: The Lady of the Camellias (1848) and Le Régent Mustel (1852) by Alexandre Dumas fils; Nana (1880) by Émile Zola; Sapho (1884) by Alphonse Daudet; and La Câlineuse (1900) by Hugues Rebell. More recently, the novel L’homme-sœur (2004) by Patrick Lapeyre based its love triangle on Manon Lescaut.

=== Adaptations ===
==== Stage ====
Although ballets and operas of Manon Lescaut became popular, only three theatrical dramas had even a modest success: The Virtuous Courtesan (1772), Manon Lescaut et le chevalier Desgrieux (1820), and Manon Lescaut (1851). The Virtuous Courtesan (French: La Courtisane vertueuse) was the first adaptation of Manon Lescaut. A theatrical comedy which ends with Manon surviving, it attempted to mix an emotional portrayal of the lovers with some humour, but reviewers found it far inferior to the novel. There were a small number of dramas in the eighteenth century and the Romantic period, followed by a larger number in the early twentieth century. Relatively few of the early theatrical adaptations of Manon Lescaut have survived.

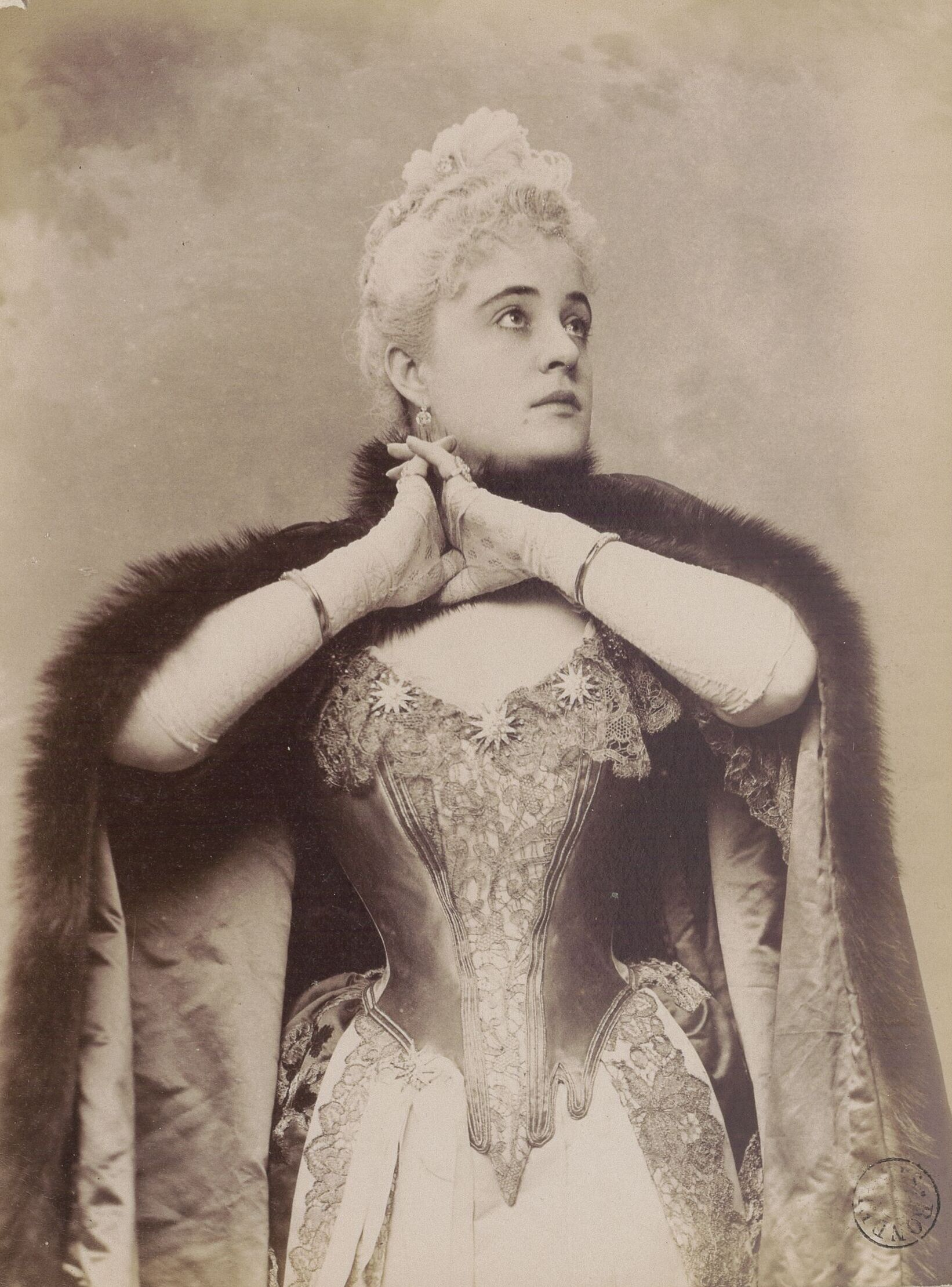
Sibyl Sanderson as Manon for an 1891 production of Jules Massenet's Manon (1884)

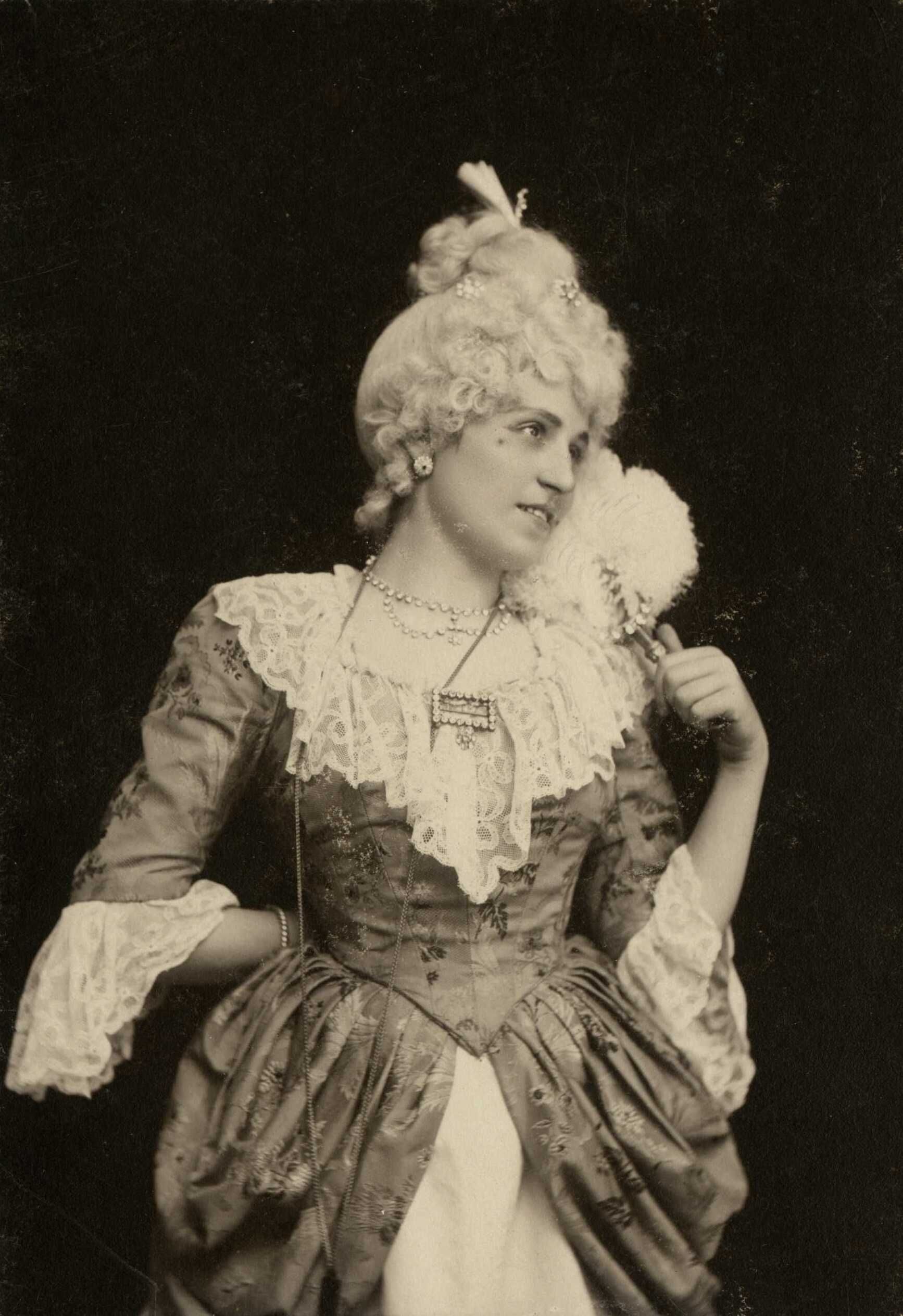
Maria Farneti as Manon for a 1900 production of Giacomo Puccini's Manon Lescaut (1893)

The literary historian Jean Sgard argues that operatic adaptations came late in the legacy of the novel because the story's mixture of genres was incompatible with the eighteenth century's dominant genre of serious opera characterized by Handel and Rameau. The first operatic adaptation, in 1836, was not a success. An important change in operatic precedent came after Giuseppe Verdi's highly successful 1853 opera, La traviata ("The Fallen Woman"). La traviata is based on the play and novel The Lady of the Camellias by Alexandre Dumas fils, which are themselves heavily inspired by Manon Lescaut. After 1853, six operas based on Manon Lescaut were written. These operas varied widely in how they adapted the story: it was divided into differing numbers of sections (from three to seven acts), and adaptations existed in the different operatic genres of comic opera, opera, and lyric drama. The most renowned adaptations of Manon Lescaut are the operas by Daniel Auber (1856), Jules Massenet (1884), and Giacomo Puccini (1893).

==== Film ====
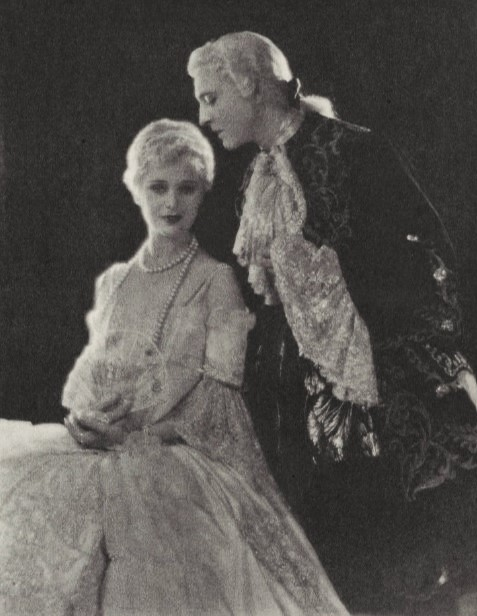
Dolores Costello as Manon and John Barrymore as des Grieux in When a Man Loves (1927)

Manon Lescaut was adapted several times after the invention of film. The first was a 1908 silent film adaptation of Puccini's opera. Several more silent films followed, of which nearly all are lost due to the degradation of nitrate film; the only one to survive in full is a 1927 Hollywood adaptation titled When a Man Loves. According to the literary historian Alan J. Singerman, several early films alter the plot to present Manon as an innocent victim who will be more sympathetic to film audiences.

Early adaptations were period films, set in the early eighteenth century; later film adaptations translate the novel's story to a contemporary setting. The 1949 film Manon by Henri-Georges Clouzot depicts des Grieux as a member of the French Resistance and Manon as a Nazi collaborator; he and Manon enter the black market and eventually stowaway to Palestine with a group of Jewish refugees. In Manon 70 by Jean Aurel, released in 1968 and set in the near-future of 1970, des Grieux is a globetrotting radio journalist who tags along with Manon's sugar baby lifestyle; instead of ending with Manon's tragic death, this film concludes with both Manon and des Grieux hitchhiking.

=== Illustrations ===
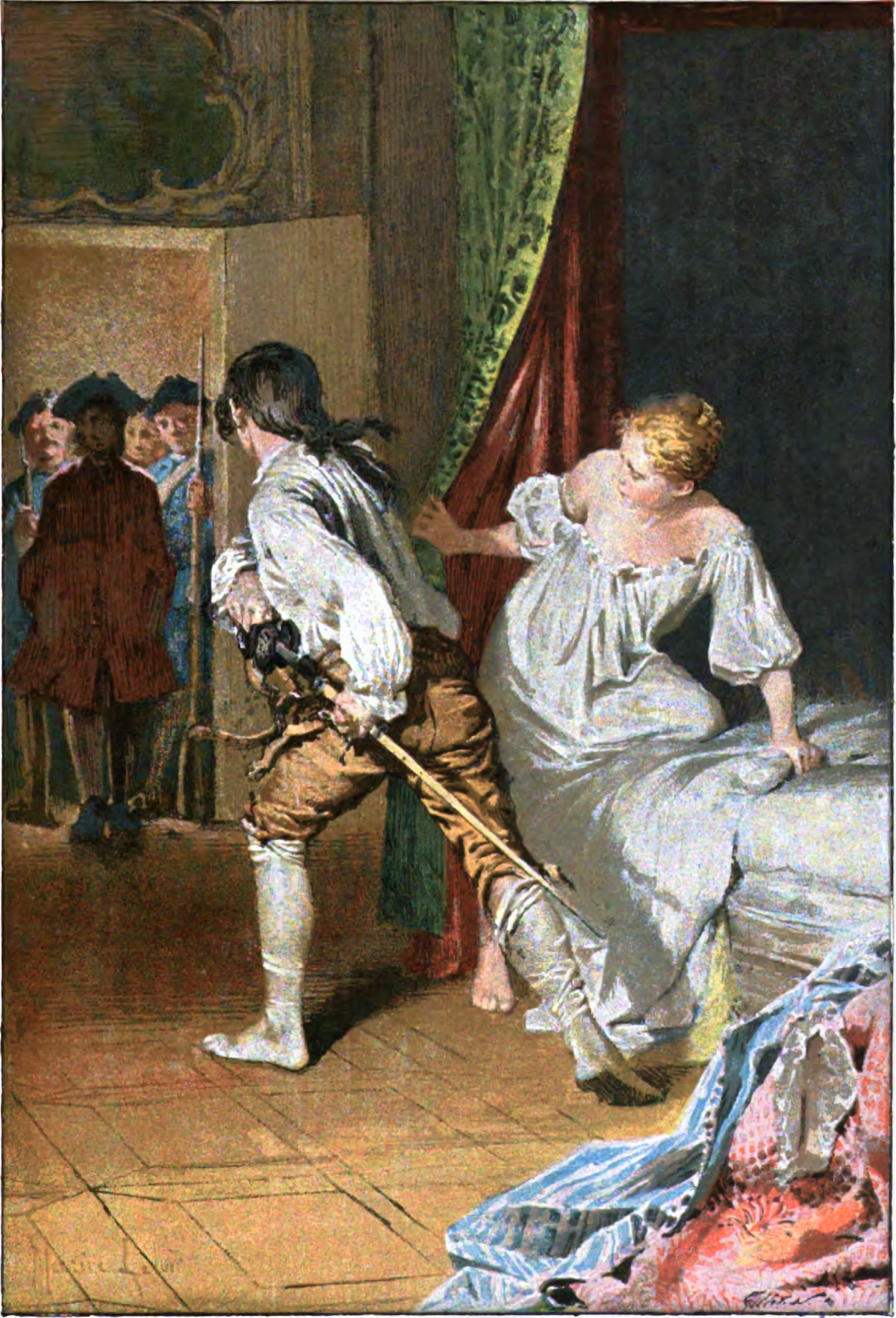
Illustration by Maurice Leloir for a 1904 edition, showing des Grieux and Manon being arrested in the young G—— M——'s bedroom.

In the mid-eighteenth century, it was unusual for serious novels to include illustrations, which were primarily associated with comic works like Don Quixote (1605–1615) or Gil Blas (1715–1735). Illustrations were first introduced in the 1753 revised edition, where Prévost personally praised and endorsed them. These included a vignette by Jean-Jacques Pasquier and eight plates: two drawn by Hubert-François Gravelot and engraved by Jacques-Philippe Le Bas, and the rest by Pasquier. The scholar Jean Sgard interprets the eight plates as a French parallel to William Hogarth's series A Harlot's Progress (1732) and A Rake's Progress (1734).

The novel does not contain any specific descriptions of Manon's physical appearance, and the first illustrations did not eroticize her. A 1797 edition introduced an illustration of Manon with her breasts visible under her nightshirt.

After the 1753 edition, new illustrated editions were produced most decades from 1780 to 1980. A 1963 catalogue identified 63 editions with original or notable illustrations. These include a 1928 edition with red-and-black, eroticized Jugendstil illustrations by Hans Henning Otto Harry Baron von Voigt. The novel also inspired a range of standalone visual interpretations (i.e., prints and paintings). Nonetheless, Manon Lescaut attracted substantially fewer illustrations than other bestsellers of the period like Voltaire's Candide (1759) or the later romance Paul et Virginie (1788).

=== Translations ===
The 1753 version of the novel is more common in modern editions. English translations of the original 1731 version of the novel include Helen Waddell's 1931 translation with a foreword by George Saintsbury. For the 1753 revision there are English translations by, among others, L. W. Tancock (Penguin, 1949—which divides the 2-part novel into a number of chapters), Donald M. Frame (Signet, 1961—which notes differences between the 1731 and 1753 editions), Angela Scholar (Oxford, 2004—with extensive notes and commentary), and Andrew Brown (Hesperus, 2004—with a foreword by Germaine Greer). There is also a 1999 edition, published by Bristol Classical Press and edited by P. Byrne, which presents the text in French with notes and commentary in English.

== Citations ==
=== Bibliography ===
- Adams, Christy Thomas (2023). "Puccini and Early Film". In Wilson, Alexandra (ed.). Puccini in Context. Composers in Context. Cambridge: Cambridge University Press. pp. 97–104. doi:10.1017/9781108891028.013. ISBN 978-1-108-83558-9.
- Albertan-Coppola, Sylviane (1995). Abbé Prévost: Manon Lescaut (in French). Presses universitaires de France. ISBN 978-2-13-046704-5.
- Bloom, Rori (2009). Man of quality, man of letters : the abbé Prévost between novel and newspaper. Lewisburg [Pa.] : Bucknell University Press. ISBN 978-0-8387-5724-6.
- Manon Lescaut. Translated by Brown, Andrew. Hesperus. 2004.
- Chisholm, Hugh, ed. (1911). "Prévost, Antoine François" . Encyclopædia Britannica. Vol. 22 (11th ed.). Cambridge University Press. pp. 311–312.
- Cronk, Nicholas; Mander, Jenny (1999-09-01). "Delilahs Progress: The Illustration of 'Manon Lescaut' in 1753 and 1928". Bulletin of the John Rylands Library. 81 (3): 321–360. doi:10.7227/BJRL.81.3.12. ISSN 2054-9318.
- Donaldson-Evans, Lance K. (2010). One Hundred Great French Books: From the Middle Ages to the Present. New York: BlueBridge. ISBN 978-1-933346-22-9.
- Manon Lescaut. Translated by Frame, Donald M. Signet. 1961.
- Francis, R. A. (1993). Prévost: Manon Lescaut. Critical Guides to French Texts. Grant & Cutler Ltd. ISBN 0 7293 0360 8.
- Frautschi, Richard L. (1972). "Narrative Voice in "Manon Lescaut": Some Quantitative Observations". L'Esprit Créateur. 12 (2): 103–117. ISSN 0014-0767. JSTOR 26279700.
- Gasster, Susan (1985). "The Practical Side of Manon Lescaut". Modern Language Studies. 15 (4): 102–109. doi:10.2307/3194653. ISSN 0047-7729. JSTOR 3194653.
- Gelfand, Elissa; Switten, Margaret (1988). "Gender and the Rise of the Novel". The French Review. 61 (3): 443–453. ISSN 0016-111X. JSTOR 393166.
- Gossman, Lionel (1982). "Male and Female in Two Short Novels by Prévost". The Modern Language Review. 77 (1): 29–37. doi:10.2307/3727491. ISSN 0026-7937. JSTOR 3727491.
- Harrisse, Henry (1896). L'abbé Prévost; histoire de sa vie et des oeuvres d'après des documents nouveaux. Paris C. Lévy.
- Ionescu, Christina (2016). "The Visual Journey of Manon Lescaut: Emblematic Tendencies and Artistic Innovation". Journal for Eighteenth-Century Studies. 39 (4): 559–577. doi:10.1111/1754-0208.12419. ISSN 1754-0208.
- Johnson, Joe (2002). "Philosophical Reflection, Happiness, and Male Friendship in Prévost's Manon Lescaut". Studies in Eighteenth-Century Culture. 31 (1): 169–190. doi:10.1353/sec.2010.0009. ISSN 1938-6133.
- Lecarme-Tabone, Eliane (1992). "Manon, Marguerite, Sapho et les autres". Romantisme. 76: 23–41. doi:10.3406/roman.1992.6029.
- Leichman, Jeffrey M. (2017). "Deneuve's Manon". The French Review. 91 (1): 93–104. doi:10.1353/tfr.2017.0393. ISSN 2329-7131.
- Mason, Haydn (1982). "Money and the Establishment: Prévost (1697–1763)". French Writers and their Society 1715–1800. London: Palgrave Macmillan UK. pp. 90–104. doi:10.1007/978-1-349-04660-7_6. ISBN 978-1-349-04662-1.
- Matoré, Georges, ed. (1953). "Avantpropos" [Foreword]. Histoire du Chevalier Des Grieux et de Manon Lescaut (in French). Librairie Droz. ISBN 978-2-600-02390-0.
- Parsons, Nicola (2009). Reading gossip in early eighteenth-century England. Palgrave studies in the Enlightenment, romanticism and cultures of print. Houndmills, Balsingstoke, Hampshire New York: Palgrave Macmillan. ISBN 978-0-230-24476-4.
- Prévost, Antoine François (1753). Histoire du chevalier Des Grieux, et de Manon Lescaut (in French).
- Prévost, Antoine François (1731). Mémoires et avantures d'un homme de qualité, qui s'est retiré du monde (in French).
- Ross, Kristin (1983). "The Narrative of Fascination: Pathos and Repetition in 'Manon Lescaut'". The Eighteenth Century. 24 (3): 199–210. ISSN 0193-5380. JSTOR 41467296.
- Scholar, Angela, ed. (2004). "Introduction". The Story of the Chevalier Des Grieux and Manon Lescaut (Oxford World's Classics ed.). Oxford : New York : Oxford University Press. ISBN 978-0-19-284065-3.
- Segal, Naomi (1986). The Unintended Reader: Feminism and Manon Lescaut. Cambridge UP. ISBN 978-0-521-30723-9.
- Seth, Catriona (2011). "French Studies: Nouvelles de la république des lettres". Journal for Eighteenth-Century Studies. 34 (4): 479–486. doi:10.1111/j.1754-0208.2011.00445.x.
- Sgard, Jean, ed. (1991). "Introduction". Manon Lescaut. Penguin Books. ISBN 978-9910-04-175-4.
- Sgard, Jean (1995). Vingt études sur Prévost d'Exiles (in French). ELLUG. ISBN 978-2-902709-96-0.
- Showalter, English (1975). "Symbolic Space and Fictional Forms in the Eighteenth-Century French Novel". Novel: A Forum on Fiction. 8 (3): 214–225. doi:10.2307/1345104. ISSN 0029-5132. JSTOR 1345104.
- Singerman, Alan J. (2000). "Manon Lescaut au cinema". In Francis, Richard A. (ed.). L' Abbé Prévost au tournant du siècle. SVEC (in French). Oxford: Voltaire Foundation. pp. 369–382. ISBN 978-0-7294-0733-5.
- Stewart, Philip (1984). Rereadings: Eight Early French novels. Birmingham, Alabama: Summa Publications. ISBN 978-0-917786-00-6.
- Manon Lescaut: A New Translation. Translated by Tancock, L.W. Penguin Classics. 1949.
- Manon Lescaut. Translated by Waddell, Helen. Constable and Company. 1934.
- Wynn, Thomas (February 2006). "Manon Through the Lens of Clouzot (1948): 'Images troublantes et précises'". French Cultural Studies. 17 (1): 73–85. doi:10.1177/0957155806060796.
- Wyngaard, Amy S. (2019). "Femme Fatale or Feminist Heroine? Interpreting Manon Lescaut". Romance Notes. 59 (3): 459–470. ISSN 0035-7995. JSTOR 26912366.
