= Memoirs and Adventures of a Man of Quality =

18th-century French novel

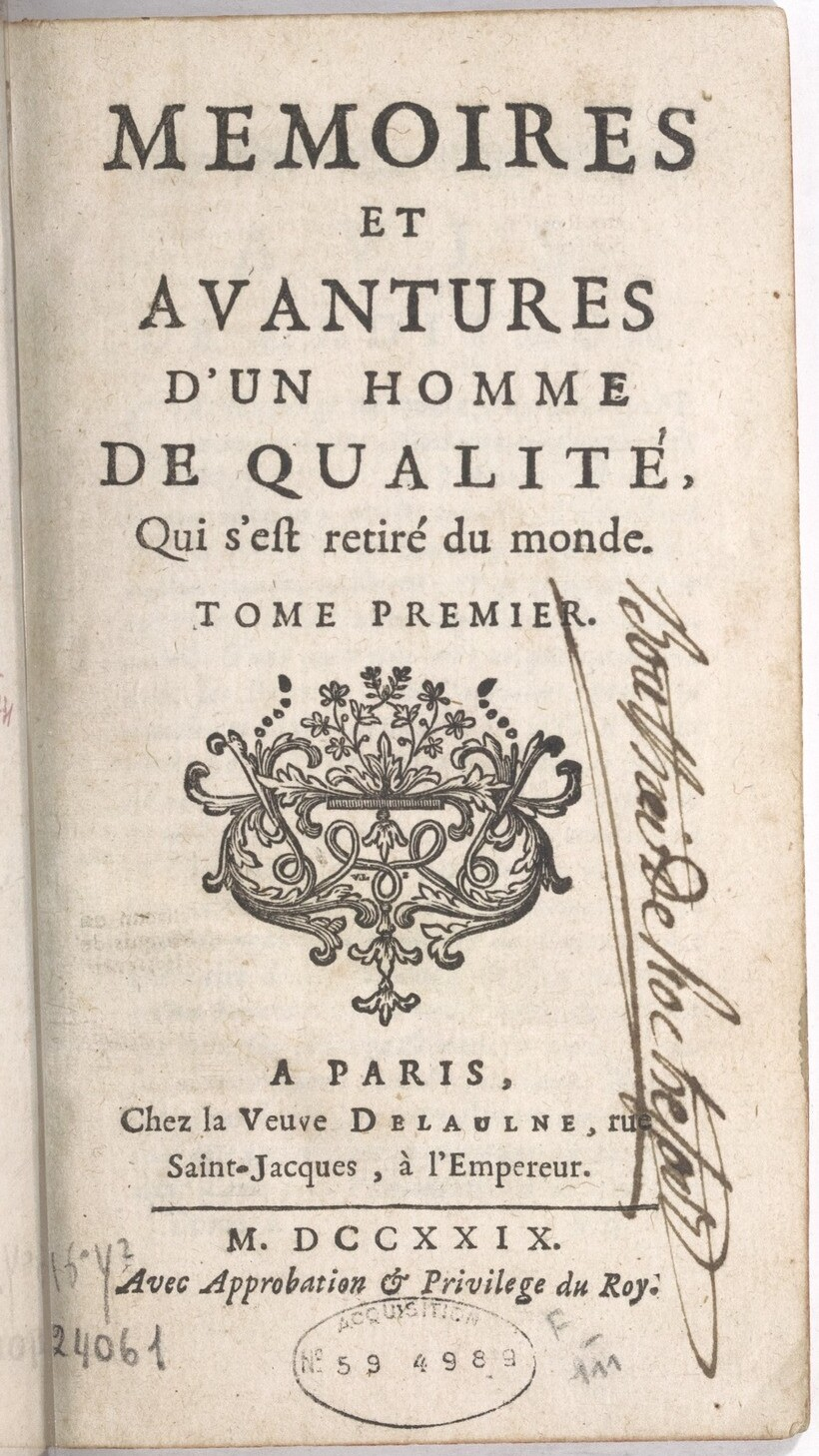
- 1729 title page
- Author: Antoine François Prévost
- Language: French
- Publisher: Paris: Delaulne (vol. 1–4); Compagnie des Libraires d'Amsterdam (vol. 5–7)
- Publication date: 1728 (vol. 1–4); 1731 (vol. 5–7)

Memoirs and Adventures of a Man of Quality, Who Withdrew from the World (Note: French: Mémoires et aventures d'un homme de qualité, qui s'est retiré du monde) was the first novel of the eighteenth-century French priest and writer Antoine François Prévost. It was published in seven volumes, four in Paris in 1728 and three more in Amsterdam in 1731.

The novel is narrated in the first person by the unnamed "Man of Quality". He has a brief career in the French military, then spends six years enslaved in Turkey. After being freed, he marries a Turkish woman; she dies, and he raises their daughter in France. At their daughter's marriage, he retires to a monastery, but is persuaded to leave it in order to escort a young Marquis on his Grand Tour. The Marquis has a tragic romance in Spain, then travels to Portugal, Holland, and England, where they witness the Jacobite rising of 1715. The Marquis's second romance, with the narrator's Turkish niece, also ends badly and the narrator retires to his monastery again. The seventh and final volume contains the story of Manon Lescaut.

The novel was appreciated in the eighteenth century for its emotionally powerful tragedy, and inspired stylistic imitators in French literature. The majority of the work has been overshadowed by the enduring success of the volume seven story of Manon Lescaut, which was later published as a standalone novel and became a historical classic of French literature. Scholars have analyzed the overall novel's depiction of supernatural events and France's diplomatic relationship with Turkey, but modern readers largely ignore all but the last volume of the Memoirs and Adventures.

== Synopsis ==
=== Volumes one and two ===
The novel is narrated by the unnamed Man of Quality. He is the son of a French Marquis who eloped and was disinherited. When the narrator is seventeen, the family is reconciled and the disinheritance is revoked. In short succession, the narrator loses most of his family: his grandfather dies of old age, his sister is killed by highwaymen, his mother dies of grief, and his father enters a monastery. The narrator expects to inherit his grandfather's title and wealth, but loses a court challenge of his legitimacy and joins the military. He serves in the Prince of Orange's guards during the 1688 invasion of England, then joins the Imperial army as a volunteer against the Turks, rising to company commander through campaigns at Jagodin, Nissa, and Vidin in the Great Turkish War. He is captured in battle and becomes a slave of the military officer Elid Ibezu, who names him "Salem".

He spends six years enslaved in Turkey, where he considers himself well-treated. An older Georgian slave, Timec, loves him unrequitedly, and he agrees to marry her. He falls in love with Elid Ibezu's daughter Sélima and they conduct a secret romance, aided seflessly by Timec, who then dies. Elid dies and Amulem, his heir, frees the narrator and gives him money, allowing him to marry Sélima. They move to Rome, where Sélima is baptized, and have a daughter Julie. Sélima dies in an epidemic fever. After a period of intense grief, he returns to France, where Julie grows to adulthood. She considers entering a convent, then marries for love. The narrator retires to a monastery.

=== Volumes three and four ===
After three years in the abbey, at age fifty-three, the narrator agrees to serve as a guide and tutor for a young Marquis's Grand Tour. He adopts the name Reconcour for his travels. They go to Madrid, where the Marquis falls in love with Diana, an impoverished young woman who intends to join a convent. During their romance, the Marquis duels a rival, killing him. The rival's uncle kidnaps Diana in revenge. Diana is stabbed during her rescue; she hastily marries the Marquis, then dies of her wounds.

The narrator and the Marquis go to Portugal and then Holland, hearing various tales of distress from people they encounter. They meet the narrator's Turkish brother-in-law Amulem and his two children: his son Muleid, and his daughter Nadine (who is traveling in disguise as a young man under the name Memiscès). They all visit the narrator's daughter Julie in France.

=== Volumes five and six ===
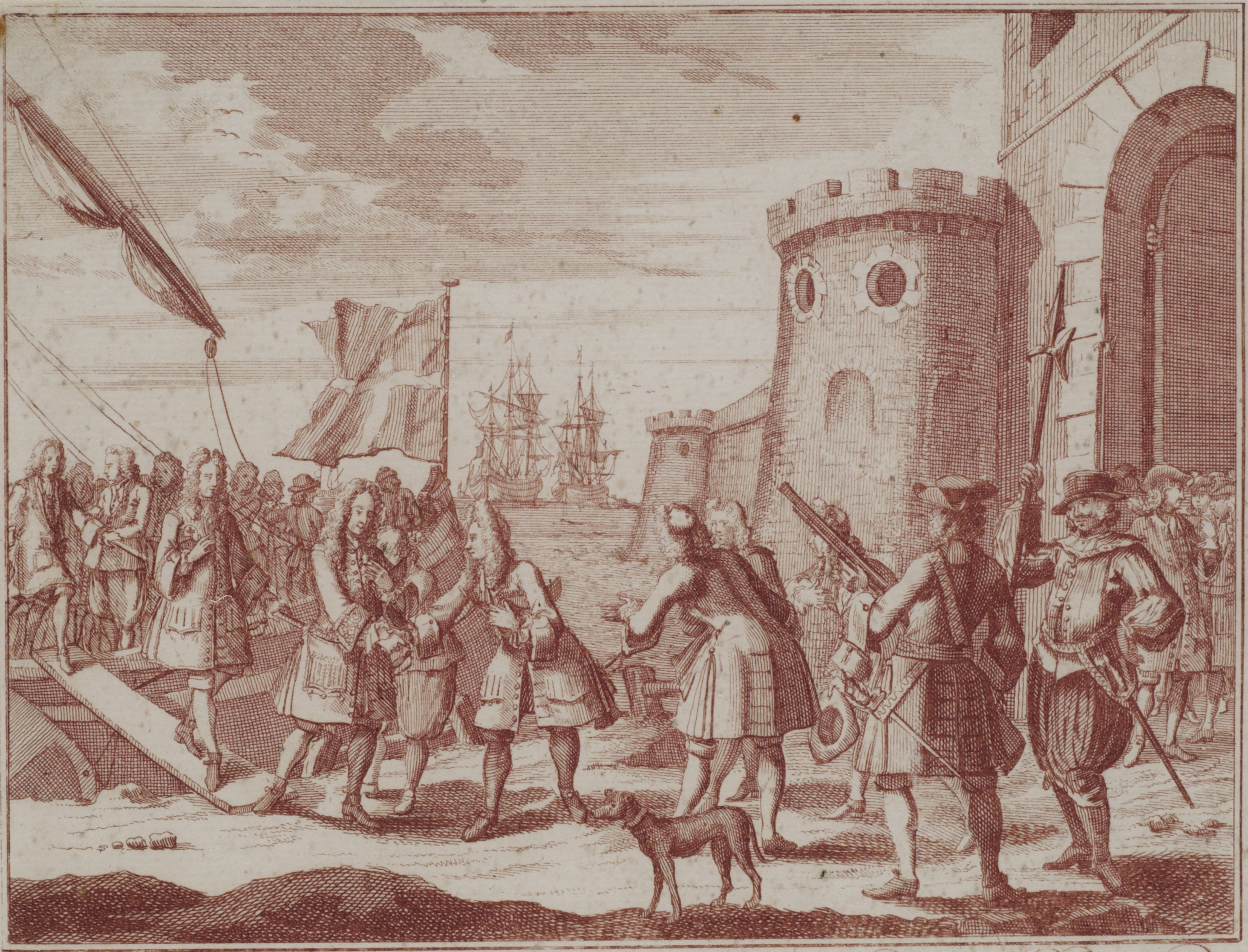
Broadside illustration of James Edward Stuart arriving in Scotland as part of the Jacobite rising of 1715; Memoirs and Adventures depicts the aftermath of the rebellion

The narrator and the Marquis travel to England. They admire English culture, hear a happy love story, and witness several executions and a prison escape after the Jacobite rising of 1715. The narrator assists a Scottish rebel, Mylady R***, agreeing to shelter her at his estate. (Note: Her name in the original text is presented with the untranslated English title, without spaces, and censors her name.) The Marquis and Nadine begin a secret romance. The narrator and the Marquis conclude their tour and return to France. Mylady R*** proposes marriage, offering her substantial fortune; the narrator declines, but she remains in his household as a family friend.

Nadine is baptized and adopted by Mylady R*** as her daughter and heir. Julie arranges a marriage between Nadine and a wealthy neighboring gentleman, M. de B***; the narrator promotes the match despite Nadine's attachment to the Marquis. The day of the wedding, Mylady R*** orchestrates a secret meeting between the Marquis and Nadine. M. de B*** discovers them together; he stabs Mylady R*** to death with his sword, and is shot to death by the Marquis. The narrator places Nadine in a convent. Muleid visits her and falls in love with another resident of the convent, Thérèse. Muleid and the Marquis abduct Thérèse and Nadine. The narrator finds them in Mons. Amuled gives his blessing to Thérèse and Muleid, and they return to Turkey. The Marquis's father disapproves of Nadine's Muslim relatives, and forbids a marriage. The Marquis vows to marry Nadine after his father's death. Disliking the idea that the Marquis would spend his life burdened by this promise, Nadine becomes a nun, ending their relationship. The narrator retires to his monastery again.

=== Volume seven ===
The narrator inserts the story of Manon Lescaut, saying that it was too long to include within the main narrative. The narrator and the Marquis encounter the Chevalier des Grieux on their return from England, and hear his tragic love story. Des Grieux, a nobleman, falls in love at first sight with Manon, a common woman. Their decision to live together without marriage is the start of a moral decline that also leads to gambling, fraud, theft, murder, and Manon's death as a deportee in New Orleans.

== Composition and publication ==
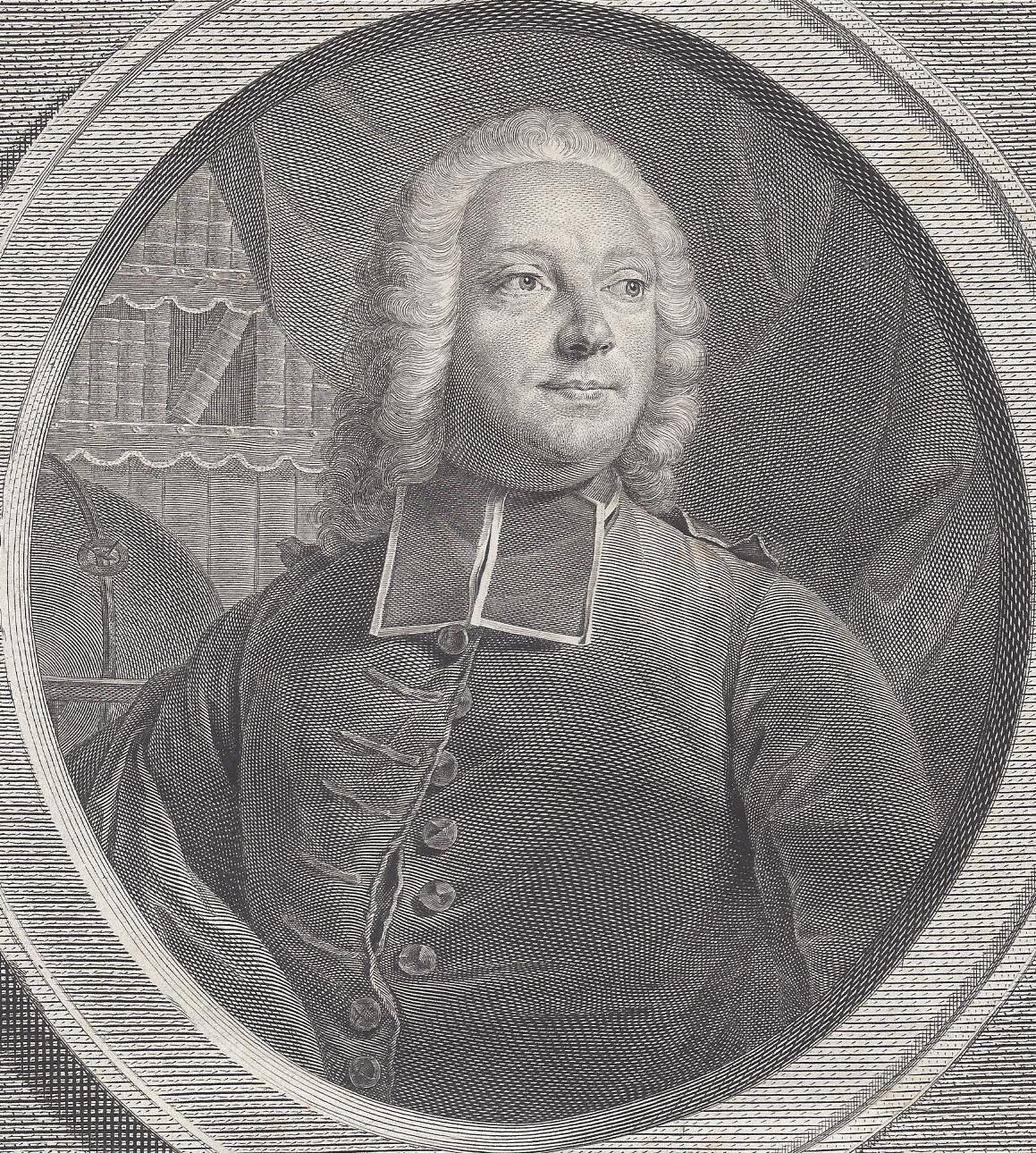
Antoine François Prévost in 1745

Antoine François Prévost was a French priest. As a young man in the 1710s, he moved multiple times between a career in the military and a novitiate in the Jesuit priesthood. He joined the Benedictines of St Maur after an unhappy love affair, taking his vows in 1721. In 1728 he was sent to the Abbey of Saint-Germain-des-Prés, Paris, where he contributed to the Gallia Christiana, a work of historiographic documentation undertaken communally by the monks there.

Memoirs and Adventures was Prévost's first novel. It is thought that he had already composed the first two volumes before arriving at Saint-Germain-des-Prés. He gave them to the censor Élie Blanchard on 15 February 1728; Blanchard approved them on 5 April; and on 16 April a printing patent was granted to the printer-bookseller Delaulne. She published the first two volumes by that September. The book did not sell quickly; copies from this print run were still being sold as late as 1732. (Note: Specifically, there are copies of the 1728 print run bearing "updated" years on their title pages from 1729, 1730, and 1732. Replacing the title page of unsold books was a technique employed by booksellers to make their backlog of stock appear less outdated to customers.) Prévost continued to write, composing two more volumes between March and September 1728, which were approved by the censor De Maunoir on 19 November 1728. Delaulne published the third and fourth volumes shortly afterward.

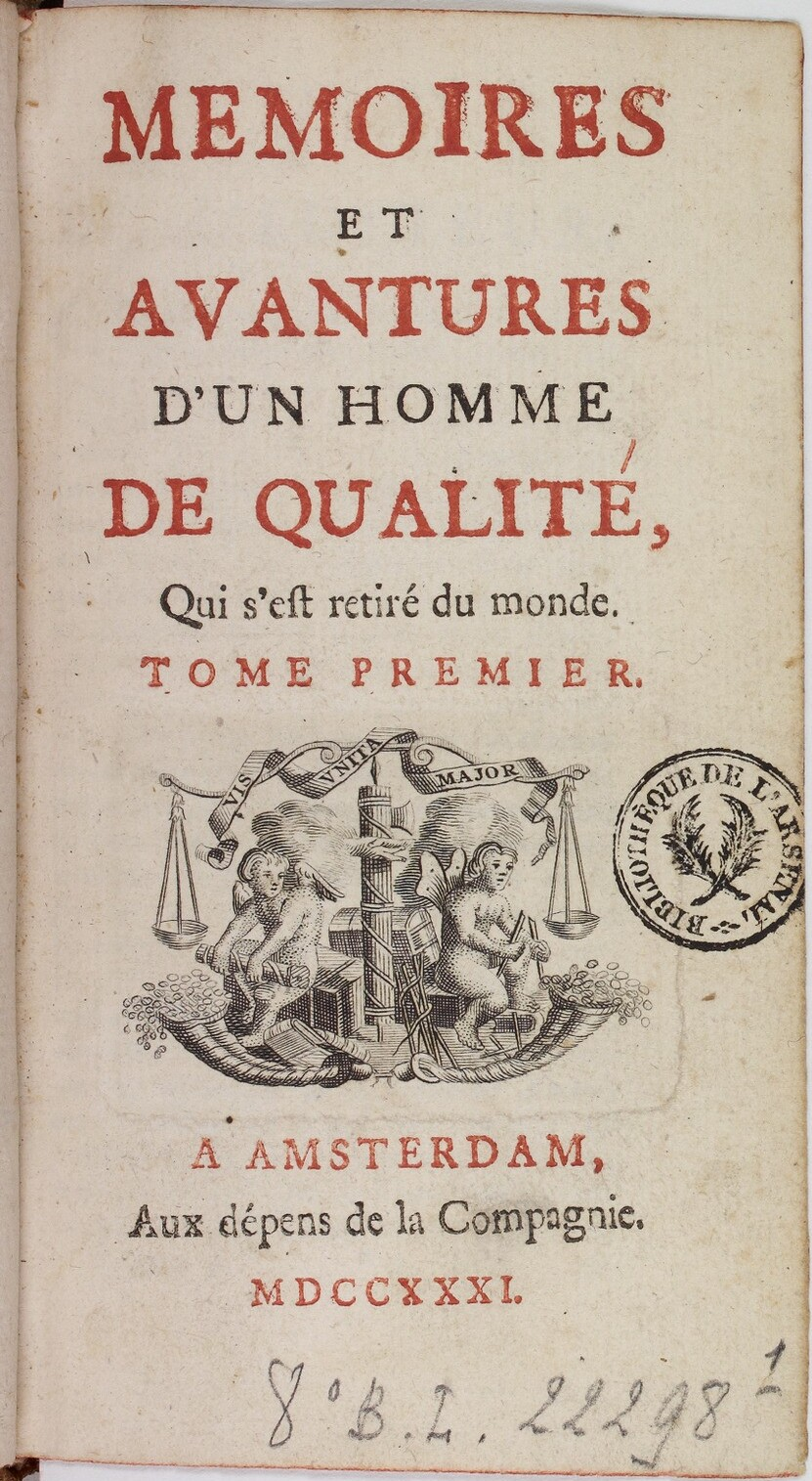
Compagnie d'Amsterdam pirated edition of volume one

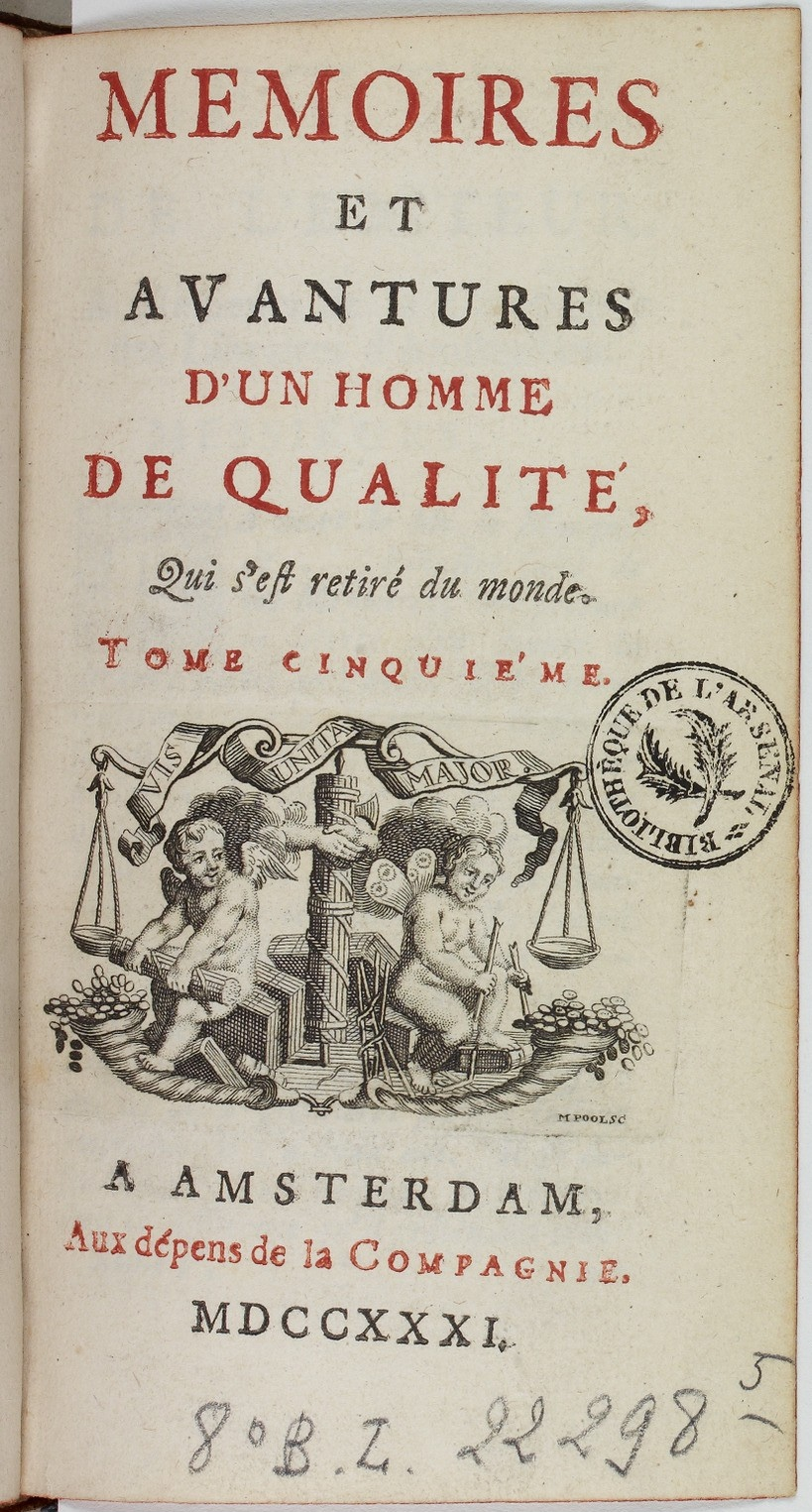
Compagnie d'Amsterdam legitimate edition of volume five

On 18 October 1728, while volumes three and four were still under review, Prévost left his abbey believing that his request for a transfer had been approved. However, it had been suspended, and on 6 November his superiors gained a lettre de cachet for his arrest. He fled the country, first to England and then in 1729 to the Netherlands. In 1730, the Compagnie des Libraires d'Amsterdam published an unauthorized reprint of the first four volumes of Memoirs and Adventures, and by 1731 had contracted with Prévost for him to continue the series. Volumes five through seven were published in May 1731. Volume seven contains the story of Manon Lescaut, which became famous as a standalone novel.

A revised and expanded version of the novel was published in 1756. The title page claimed that the revisions were based on new manuscripts found after the death of the narrator, maintaining the fiction that the entire work was a found manuscript.

=== English translation ===
The first English translation was overseen by Edward Cave with some financial investment from Samuel Johnson. Cave published the first volume in 1739, and the second volume in 1741. The preface includes a note that "The Translator has taken the Liberty in several Instances to soften, but never to contradict the Author's Meaning" so that readers would not be alienated by the narrator's Catholicism and noble rank; thanks to the anonymous translator's amendments, the preface says, the novel "may suit every Man, whatever be his Religion or Quality." This translation was a commercial failure, and Cave was still burdened with unsold copies as late as 1753.

Other English translations in the eighteenth century include a 1741 edition printed in Dublin and translated by a Mr. Erskine, a 1747 edition published by John Nourse, and a 1770 edition published by Francis Newbery which re-used Cave's translation.

== Form ==
The novel is narrated in the first person by the unnamed "Man of Quality". The literary scholar English Showalter names Memoirs and Adventures as a defining example of eighteenth-century French novels which use their narrators to maintain the classical unities of time and place. A brief "Note from the Editor" presents the novel as a found manuscript, claiming that the editor received the manuscript personally from the narrator, whose name is withheld to protect his privacy.

The French scholar Benjamin Baker describes the novel as having a "segmentary esthetic", which forgoes an overarching plot in favour of loosely-connected episodes. The literary historian R. A. Francis describes it as "vivid but sometimes rambling". Like Prévost's other novels, according to the French scholar Jean Norgaisse, its narrative is an "incessant quest" characterized by "anguish" for both the protagonist and the characters he encounters: Norgaisse says, "Their quests always end in failure."

Like many eighteenth-century novels, Memoirs and Adventures was written in installments that were published without a firm plan for how many volumes the work would eventually encompass. Each installment stops at a point that could plausibly be the end of the work. The Prévost scholar Jean Sgard has described Memoirs and Adventures as being four novels overlapping with each other: volumes one and two; volumes three and four; volumes five and six; and volume seven, Manon Lescaut. Of these, he considers the first pair of volumes and Manon Lescaut the most "unified" and complete as narratives.

== Analysis ==
Around the time of the novel's composition, scholars, physicians, and clergy publicly debated whether extraordinary phenomena (such as alleged miraculous convulsions at Saint-Médard cemetery) served as proof of the supernatural. According to the literary scholar Coralie Bournonville, Prévost was skeptical of the supernatural, and used Memoirs and Adventures to explore the psychological motivations that lead people to create and circulate supernatural interpretations of extraordinary events. Several scenes raise the possibility of the supernatural: the narrator causes an unexpected and mysterious fire in a tomb; a Spaniard recounts seeing a young woman in the forest dismembered by demon-like figures; and another two Spaniards tell a story about a werewolf. The novel allows some ambiguity about the "truth" of these events, focusing instead on the stories and fear they inspire. Bournonville argues that the novel's investigation of supposedly supernatural events becomes an anthropological inquiry into human nature, which proves to be "neither less disturbing nor less fascinating than the supernatural". (Note: French: Quand il s'agit de l'homme, le naturel n'est ni moins inquiétant ni moins fascinant que le surnaturel.)

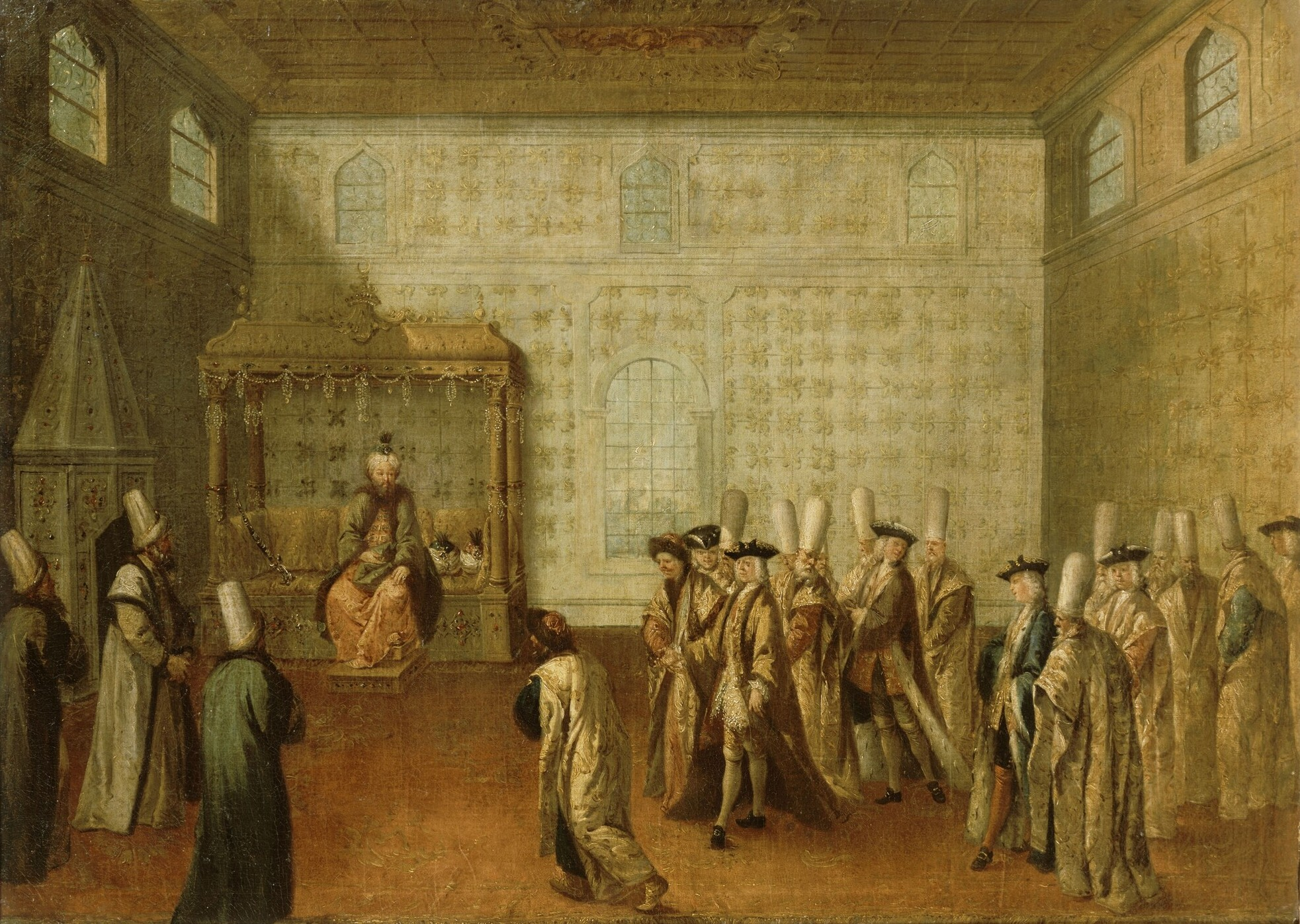
1699 French painting of the French ambassador Charles de Ferriol being greeted by Sultan Ahmed III

Another literary context for the work is France–Turkey relations, especially eighteenth-century France's orientalist interest in stories about Turkey and the Ottoman Empire. During the narrator's extended period of slavery in Turkey, he observes and influences several aspects of Turkish culture. For example, he writes a Turkish translation of the didactic French novel Les Aventures de Télémaque by François Fénelon; in the novel, his translation is widely admired and inspires the adoption of the printing press in Turkey substantially earlier than its real adoption there. As a result of interactions like these, which show French culture as being admired and embraced in stark contrast with the experiences of actual French ambassadors at the time, the literary scholar Paul J. Young argues that Memoirs and Adventures presents "a fantasy of French cultural domination, in which the French nation ... unilaterally captivates a passive Orient".

== Reception and legacy ==
Eighteenth-century readers generally praised the novel, especially for its success inducing tears. One contemporary reader noted the emotional impact of the novel in her correspondence, writing: "There is a new book here... It is not worth much; however, you read 190 pages and burst into tears." (Note: French: Il y a ici un nouveau livre, intitulé Mémoires d'un homme de qualité retiré du monde. Il ne vaut pas grand-chose ; cependant on en lit 190 pages en fondant en larmes) The literary historian Rori Bloom interprets her response as reflecting both the effectiveness and the low cultural value of Prévost's sentimental fiction.

According to the literary scholar English Showalter, Memoirs and Adventures "set a style for the whole century" with its emphasis on regretful retrospective tales narrated from confinement: "Dozens of fictional narrators preface their works by explaining that they hope the story of their own errors and misfortunes will serve as a guide to others." Showalter also says that Prévost's "globetrotting characters," who "dash about the world," inspired subsequent French novelists to depict expansive global travel. Rori Bloom argues that Prévost's novels, including Memoirs and Adventures, reflect seventeenth-century traditions that are at a transition point in French literature before the Enlightenment rationality that eventually dominated eighteenth-century literature. The literary historian Richard Maxwell notes that Prévost is influenced by the seventeenth-century writer Madeleine de Scudéry, who wrote expansive romances.

Volume seven of Memoirs and Adventures, which began to be reprinted as a standalone novel in 1733, eventually eclipsed the rest of the work. In the nineteenth century, this volume (now known as Manon Lescaut) remained popular through adaptations, especially into opera, and editions with prefaces written by the famous French authors Alexandre Dumas fils and Anatole France. Over time, the standalone Manon Lescaut came to be regarded as a historical classic. In 1991 it was the most reprinted novel in French literature, with over 250 editions over the preceding 260 years. Today, modern readers largely ignore all but the last volume of the Memoirs and Adventures, such that Prévost's legacy rests almost entirely upon Manon Lescaut.
