= Mohammed ibn Zakri al-Fasi =

Mohammed Abu Abdallah ibn Abd al-Rahman ibn Zakri al-Fasi (Arabic: عبد الرحمن بن زكري; died 1731) was a Moroccan writer of the 18th century. He is the author of commentaries on works of grammar, theology and mysticism, didactic poems and prose work. His biography (Al-arf al-sihri fi bad fadail) was written by al-Ghassani al-Wazir (1653–1733).
