= Correction girls =

18th century women forcibly shipped to French North America

Colonies of New France

Correction girls were women who were forcibly shipped from France to its colonies in America as brides for its colonists during the early 18th century.

== Background ==
France was struggling to establish colonies in Louisiana in the late 17th and early 18th centuries. It needed stable settlements under French control to help anchor French sovereignty. Many of its settlers were there unwillingly, taking the earliest opportunities available to return to France, while others were more interested in exploration and hunting furs than in farming. The French authorities believed marriage would encourage more settlers to remain in the settlements.

In 1699, the founder of the Louisiana colony, Pierre Le Moyne d'Iberville, obtained permission from King Louis XIV for French settlers to marry Native American women, thinking that this solution would both stabilize the colony and help assimilate local tribes to French culture. Instead, the settlers who married "have themselves become almost Indian, residing among them and living in their manner". Governor Jean-Baptiste Le Moyne de Bienville felt that Indian-French marriages were detrimental to development of the colony and that the settlers should instead marry French women.

The first group of prospective wives sent to Louisiana were the casquette or Pelican girls, recruited from orphanages and convents and selected for virtue and piety. Finding that the conditions at the colony were much harsher than described and most of the marriage prospects inferior, the women protested; the colonial government disregarded their complaints and sea captains refused them passage back to France. Few French women were willing to immigrate after hearing of the treatment of the Pelican girls and the conditions in Louisiana.

== Forced immigration ==
Between 1712 and 1721, approximately 7,000 women were selected for forced immigration. Many were taken from orphanages, city streets, prisons, and hospitals. The passenger lists showed that they were "sent by the King" or "exiled".

Some women selected for forced immigration were chained and marched across France, a display intended to deter potential criminals. During a protest by 150 female prisoners in 1719, six were shot and a dozen were wounded; after a freezing winter, they were still shipped to the settlement. Of the 7,000 women selected, most died on the forced marches or on the sea voyage, and only 1,300 arrived at the colony.

Some of the women were forcibly married to male prisoners also being sent to Louisiana.

Many correction girls were sickly and malnourished; some had venereal diseases and others were dangerous criminals. Settlement administrators complained of women "who are useless and who do nothing but cause disorder". A letter from a settlement administrator in 1721 stated:

Eighty-eight girls arrived by La Baleine. Since the fourth of March, nineteen of them have been married off...So that fifty-nine girls are still to be provided for (ten have died). This will be difficult as these girls are not well selected...Whatever the vigilance exercised upon them, they could not be restrained.

The adventures of one of the correction girls inspired Manon Lescaut, a novel by Abbé Prévost, as well as the operas Manon by Jules Massenet and Manon Lescaut by Giacomo Puccini. The actual Manon had been arrested for "scandalous debauchery" and was branded before being sent to Louisiana; she later returned to France.

In later years, it was common for Louisianans to claim that their descent was through the casquette girls rather than the correction girls, and later researchers would remark that while none of the correction girls had apparently had children, the casquette girls had been remarkably fertile.

== See also ==
- Mail-order bride
- King's Daughters
