= Récit =

Subgenre of the French novel

A récit is a subgenre of the French novel, in which the narrative calls attention to itself. Literary critic Roger Shattuck explains, "During a récit, we are conscious of being at one remove from the action; the very act of narration interferes and calls attention to itself." Examples of the récit include works by Benjamin Constant and Eugene Fromentin, André Gide, Maurice Blanchot, and Michel Leiris. According to Shattuck,

The discomfort of the narrator in confronting his own effort of composition (by now it should be apparent that narrator and author become indistinguishable) has been inherited as one of the principal features of the recit.

Critic Geoffrey Hartman describes the récit as "a confessional narrative, a kind of dramatic monologue in prose . ... "

Daniel Just writes of an ambiguity in the nature of the récit:

For literary critics, the récit as a category became ... elusive—at once too broad and too specific. Meaning a "narrative" in general, récit has been used as an indefinite notion embracing many prose genres, to the point when it ceases to be clear if it does not coincide with narrative literature as such. At the same time, it has also served to identify a stylistic specificity found in the select works of only a few writers. This latter use finds perhaps its most exemplary illustrations in André Gide's L'Immoraliste and Albert Camus's La Chute. Gide, in particular, was quite meticulous in differentiating between his novels and their complex view of life, and his récits that portray life from a single perspective. Blanchot's insistence on the difference between the novel and the récit is equally scrupulous, but for other reasons. His emphasis on a strong generic meaning of the term récit—which is evident in spite of the semantic overload this notion sometimes undergoes in his theoretical texts—has nothing to do with the number of points of view represented in the story. For Blanchot, the récit is a distinct literary form whose uniqueness resides in its not merely stylistic but "essential" difference from the genre of the novel.

Maurice Blanchot describes the récit as follows:

If we regard the récit as the true telling of an exceptional event which has taken place and which someone is trying to report, then we have not even come close to sensing the true nature of the récit. The récit is not the narration of an event, but the event itself, the approach to that event, the place where that event is made to happen—an event which is yet to come and through whose power of attraction the récit can come into being, too.

== Sources ==
- Dhareshwar, Vivek (1986–1987). "The Song of the Sirens in the Heart of Darkness the Enigma of Récit". boundary 2. 15 (1/2): 69–84. doi:10.2307/303423. JSTOR 303423.
- Hartman, Geoffrey H. (1961). "Maurice Blanchot: Philosopher-Novelist". Chicago Review. 15 (2): 1–18. doi:10.2307/25293657. JSTOR 25293657.
- Just, Daniel (2009). "The Politics of the Novel and Maurice Blanchot's Theory of the Récit, 1954-1964". French Forum. 33 (1/2): 121–139. doi:10.1353/frf.0.0043. JSTOR 40552498. S2CID 170112899.
- Shattuck, Roger (1950). "The Doubting of Fiction". Yale French Studies (6): 101–108. doi:10.2307/2929201. JSTOR 2929201.
