= The Adventures of Rivella =

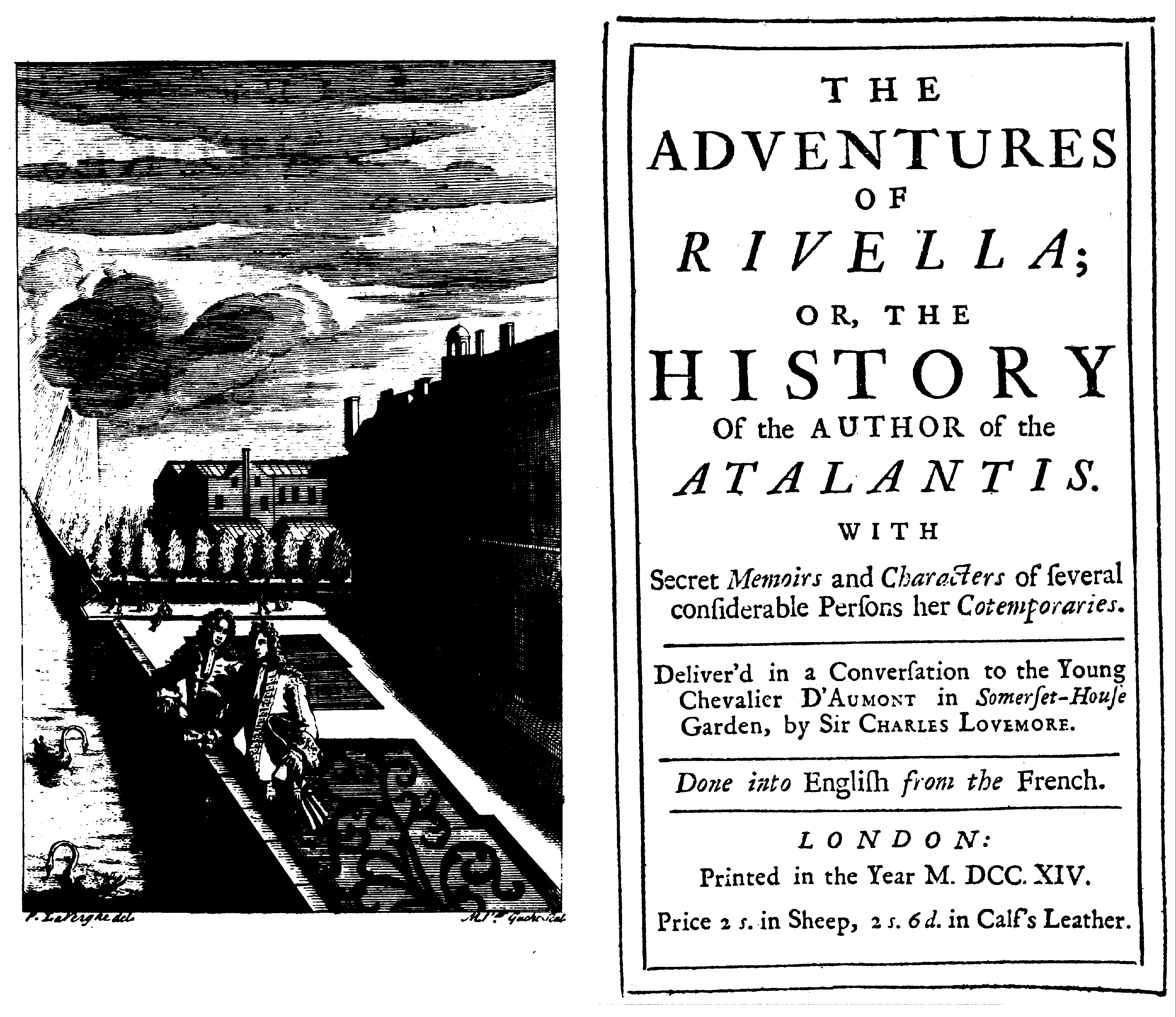
Frontispiece and title cover of The Adventures of Rivella (Published by Edmund Curl, 1714).

The Adventures of Rivella (1714) is the last novel written by eighteenth century English author Delarivier Manley. The work is a semi-autobiographical account of Manley's life seen through the fictional character of Rivella. Delarivier Manley's final novel, which was later edited and published by Edmund Curll, is centred around her life before, during, and after her treacherous marriage. The events and incidents incurred by the fictional character Rivella are narrated to the reader through a conversational dialogue between two male protagonists, being Sir Lovemore and Sir D'Aumont. The narrative tells that the young chevalier D'Aumont has left France in search of sexual partnership with Rivella (the author) and instead finds the rejected lover, Sir Charles Lovemore who does not assist the Frenchman in arranging contact with Rivella, but tells her life story instead, both as it relates in public gossip and her personal writings.

The narrator Sir Lovemore recounts his incursions with the young woman named Rivella who he describes as irresistible and charming, as well as detailing her career as a political writer, defendant in two separate trials, and ultimately her search for love and companionship. The character known as Rivella is from the very outset of the novel (seen in the cover page) known as the "author of the (New) Atalantis" another novel written by Delarivier Manley in 1709. Through these two characters, Manley addresses literary questions regarding conventional notions of female writers in England during the eighteenth century, as well as the distinction between sexual abstinence and moral virtue. The novel comprises a title page, a preface, an introduction, and a continuous paragraphed narrative, with a total of approximately 27,000 words.

== Plot summary ==
The novel begins with a conventional exchange between with the fictive characters of Chevalier D'Aumont and Sir Charles Lovemore who are parlaying in conversation within the garden of the Somerset House. During this exchange Sir Charles Lovemore accentuates his personal interactions and affections for Rivella. For Janet Todd, Rivella was born plain between two beautiful sisters. Lovemore indicates to D'Aumont, and indirectly to Manley's readership that he is in love with Rivella, and depicts a woman that is witty, alluring, and sensual. However, later in the novel she descends into disgrace, as her writings are used against her during a public defamation and her subsequent imprisonment. Although she incurred this series of unfortunate circumstances, Rivella acquired a lifelong admirer being Sir Charles Lovemore who now is translating her story. After the death of her father, Rivella is easily persuaded into a bigamous marriage with an older nobleman, who becomes her guardian. The marriage substantiated into a violent and bigamous partnership, leaving Rivella as a fallen woman alone and without a protector. The narrative is made further complex when characters and their respective schemes are revealed, which continually allude to similar real-world incidents such as the deposition of James II (1688).

Following this, Lovemore narrates Rivella's part in a major lawsuit, where she defends her personal ethics nature against individuals who are identified as unethical. She is ultimately found innocent of the charges laid against her. In Rivella's recovery, she begins using her wit and reputation to write for the stage, which stood out as the clear outlet for expression at the time for the female writer. True to the semi-autobiographical nature of Manley's novel, this lawsuit mirrors an actual lawsuit the Delarivier Manley was subject to in her own life. Subsequently, the novel begins its conclusion with Rivella demonstrating a visible re-positioning of her political and ethical attitudes into more moderate connotations. This undoubtedly prepared Rivella, and by association Manley for the imitate shift in 18th century political power in England. The novel concludes with Sir Lovemore finishing his "History of Rivella", and with D'Aumont and Lovemore setting off to find Rivella in the hope of becoming well acquainted with her and her intellectual brilliance.

== Sources and context ==
In order to present her autobiography as a fictional narrative, Manley drew on a number of key events in her life, and references to her other literature to write her novel. One such event was her arrest in 1709 and subsequent trial for seditious libel against the Whig controlled government of Queen Anne. Manley herself was an adamant and passionate supporter of the Tory party, with her fiction bearing much of her political outlook. These characteristics have also been credited to her satirical chastising of Whig party figures, including Sarah Churchill, who was known as Lady Marlborough at the time of Rivella's publication.

Manley surrendered herself to the authorities on 29 October 1709 after the State's Secretary issued a warrant for her arrest, as well as one for her publishers and printers, who by this stage had already been remanded into custody. After four consecutive days of questioning Manley's associates were released, however she remained in custody until she was released on bail on 7 November 1709. Her trial took place at the Queen's Bench Court on 11 February 1710, where she was found not guilty of seditious libel. The not guilty verdict was founded on the fact that all of Manley's publications that were being used as evidence against her during the trial were prefaced as fictional works, and therefore did not carry any realistic implications of statements that could be seen as professionally detrimental to the party in government.

In The Adventures of Rivella, Manley references these events extensively in the final 30 pages of her novel. This is illustrated as a fictionalised libel hearing that is told from the perspective of a third-person autobiography. Rivella's responses during the trial mirror that of Manley's political attitudes, offering readers a confessional defence in which:

"she was . . . out of humour with . . . a faction who were busy to enslave their sovereign and overturn the constitution, that she was proud of having more courage than had any of our sex and of throwing the first stone, which might give a hint for other persons of more capacity to examine the defects and vices of some men who took a delight to impose upon the world by the pretence of public good, whilst their true design was only to gratify and advance themselves."Delarivier Manley, Rivella (London: Edmund Curll, 1714). E-text

Recent commentators on Manley's political satire such as Catherine Gallagher have stated that these sardonic descriptions of Whig leaders had a remanence of truth about them. This made Manley's fiction widely popular as well as dangerous when it was first introduced to the public. As a result, Manley did not put her name on Rivella, instead just referring her readers to the title of a History of the Author of the New Atalantis.

== Analysis, major themes and scholarship ==
Scholars including Malcolm Bosse, Fidelis Morgan, Benjamin Boyce, and Janet Todd describe The Adventures of Rivella (1714) in terms of Delarivier Manley's complicated use of frame in her narrative, its flirtatious expression of a female voice in the public eye, and its multifaceted relationship to multiple literary genres. Critics have described Manley's allusion ravaged text as a "quasi-fictional autobiography" or a "pseudo-autobiography" that mixes both fact and fiction. The novel has also been described as a frame-narrative, which presents what Fidelis Morgan (1986) claims is a preeminent source for information about the life of its author Delarivier Manley.

In an essay written as part of an introduction to the 1972 publication of Manley's The Adventures of Rivella, Malcolm Bosse identifies that Manley had written her final novel in hast, as to possibly offset and forestall the publication of a diatribe written by Charles Gildon, which would have possibly incriminated Manley. Bosse goes on to highlight that within Manley's fictional autobiography, she avoided defending her conduct as a satirical writer of politics in favour of seeking to justify her behaviour as an eighteenth century woman. Rivella begins with the label of a "Translator's Preface", which declares that the novel to follow is a translation from its original state as a French manuscript. Although this preface exists only in the novel's first addition, with the second edition being published without it in 1717, Manley's claim that her fictional autobiography was a translation shows a distance aesthetically from other eighteenth century writers such as Daniel Defoe. Some scholars have stated that this use of a translation preface was a tool, which Delarivier Manley employed to protect herself against defamation. Manley's knowledge of dramatic irony has been consistently discovered throughout her novels, and in the case of Rivella she employs irony depict a two men dialogue in regards to the physical qualities a woman must possess to be seen as desirable. In these early stages of the narrative, Manley takes the opportunity to satirically provide a rapturous account of her beauty and attractiveness. However, her fictional self-portrait has led particular scholars to stipulate that the character of Rivella illustrates a woman whose difficulties in life have arisen from her own sensuality, or as it is stated in the novel, from "the Greatness of her Prepossession". Accordingly, "what emerges here is a realistic account of female vulnerability to passion and the sad consequences of unfounded optimism."

Other analysts point out a multitude of stylistic simplicities and a lack of a coherent novel structure. However, The Adventures of Rivella demonstrated a congruence between Delarivier Manley's life as the author and the themes of her subsequent fiction. In her novel, Manley's life is presented as socially involved, energetic, and fragmentary. It stands to scholarship as an intriguing psychological study of a woman who was a popular novelist in the eighteenth-century, with insights into the abundance of her idiosyncratic creativity. In a 1989 essay by Janet Todd, The Adventures of Rivella (1714) is described as a fictional autobiography that tells the life of a literary character who claims to have been the writer of another one of Delarivier Manley's novels, the New Atalantis, which by the time of Rivella's publication had become an infamous literary work. Additionally, the narrator of Rivella accentuates that the narrative of Delia in The New Atalantis is in actuality the life story of the author. Consequently, Rivella the author becomes the product Delia's sexual victimisation as an innocent young orphan. Linguistically, by putting the names of the two major characters Delia and Rivella together, the result is the first name of the real-world author of both novels, being Delarivier.

== Publication history ==
The first edition of the novel The Adventures of Rivella was printed in the year 1714, in London, England, and cost 2 shillings bound in sheep leather or 2 shilling sixpence in calf's leather. In this initial publication of the novel, as in later iterations, the publisher makes a statement in the form of a "translator preface". This preface is a part of the fictional chronology of the novel that symbolically represents much of the book's initial publication and conception. In this preface the publisher is identified as a Frenchman, who became the "Master of the following papers" because he was a "Gentleman of the chamber" of the French nobility. The publisher of the novel is known and identified by is occupation as an "Amanuensis" that served his French master (being the fictional Chevalier D'Aumont) up until his death. This translator preface serves a fictional purpose for the novel, which is that it disclaims many of the "Verse's" found in the English edition are not found in the original French text. As the preface states:

"The English Reader is desir'd to take Notice that the Verses are not to be found in the French Copy; but to make the Book more perfect, Care has been taken to transcribe them with great Exactness from the English printed Tragedy of the same Author, yet extant among us."

A second edition of The Adventures of Rivella also known by this point in history as the History of the Author of the Atlantis with Secret Memoirs and Characters of several considerable Persons her Contemporaries was published in the following year of 1715. This edition was also printed in London, and published under the editing and directorship of Edmund Curll. By 1717, the novel's content had been considerably altered due to literary questioning of the novel's autobiographic qualities. These alterations to the "Introduction" and to later parts of the narrative concerning Rivella's involvement the novel's in court trials were also the result of a decline in the book's validity. The decline in validity arose from the publication of two opposing iterations of Manley's novel Rivella. One of these versions was published by Edmund Curll, and the other by the eighteenth century publisher J. Roberts. In 1714, Roberts printed a complete key with his edition of The Adventures of Rivella that made Manley's narrative into a text that better resembled a memoir of her life. Roberts edition contested Curll's publication as the source of the novel's second edition. When the year 1717 came to an end, there were at least three separate editions of Manley's novel.

After the death of Delarivier Manley in 1725, her former publisher Edmund Curll published a history of the early publications of The Adventures of Rivella (1714) in the preface of his posthumous edition (1725). This posthumous edition was the fourth edition of the novel. Dated 29 September 1724, Curll's "history" of Rivella's authorship does not include details such as the manuscript's date of completion, its date of printing, or its date of publication. Katherine Zelinsky, an editor of a 20th-century edition of Rivella identifies this "long-deferred 'history' of Rivella's authorship" was a termination of his informal contract that he was to conceal Manley's identity as the author of her fictional autobiography. Zelinsky also identifies that the restraint that Curll shows during his written explanation of Rivella's publication history was due to Manley's professional rivalry with and subsequent fear of exposure by publisher John Barber, whom she was living with during the publication of the novel's first edition in 1714. Since the death of the novel's original publisher Edmund Curll in 1747 there has been numerous republications and edited versions of Rivella published throughout the 19th, 20th, and 21st centuries.

== Literary significance and reception ==
During her time as a columnist and author, Delarivier Manley was one of eighteenth-century England's most popular female writers. She also stood as England's first female political journalist, with her impact on public opinion being documented through her fictional and satirical writings. As an adamant supporter of the Tory party, her writings were often used for political commentary on the Whig government that was in power during the reign of Queen Anne. The Adventures of Rivella was received as a vivid depiction of the challenges female writers faced in attempting to become accomplished authors. It also stands as a contribution to the eighteenth century development of allegory, as well as an example the growing use of framing devices by novelists who write in the genre of satire. The novel Rivella represents a widely popular text with much of its acclaim and popularity being drawn from Manley's early novel The New Atalantis (1709). In The Adventures of Rivella Manley uses a mixture of realism, naturalistic dialogue, and the French style of amatory fiction, which had never been used to such an extent in English novels.
