= Love in a Maze (ballad) =

Song

Love in a Maze is an English broadside ballad that dates back, from estimation by the English Short Title Catalogue, to the 1640s, which immediately coincides with the publication of James Shirley's play, The Changes, or Love in a Maze, in 1639. The full title of the ballad is: "Love in a MAZE: / OR, The Young-man put to his Dumps. / Here in this Song you may behold and see / A gallant Girl obtain'd by Wit and Honesty; / All you that hear my Song, and mark it but aright, / Will say true love's worth gold, and breeds delight." It is set to the tune of, "The True Lovers Delight; Or, The Cambridge Horn." The ballad's opening lines are, "LAte in the Morning as I abroad was walking,/All in a meadow green, I heard two Lovers talking;." Extant copies of the ballad can be found at the Glasgow University Library, the British Library, the Huntington Library, the Pepys Library at Magdalene College, and the National Library of Scotland.

== Synopsis ==
The play begins with voyeuristic means: the, seemingly omniscient, narrator stumbles upon two witty lovers on a hilly knoll close to a river. The young man—the first of the two speaking roles—professes his love for a fair, wealthy maiden—the second and wittier. She is reluctant to comply with this wish to be married, and replies that love, "is like a fishers angle,/ which oft hath golden baites, silly maidens to intangle." The young man continues to profess his adoration and enchantment with the maid, but she can see through his falsity—she acknowledges that young men constantly chase after young women, vocalizing their love, but are only interested in the woman's virginity. The young man is undeterred and asks for a test to prove his ardor. The maid takes to the riverbed and plucks a bouquet of "may" and "time" and she hands it to him as a riddle. The young man blushes and answers the riddle: "This May [May first is the month and date of the ballad's setting] stuck in Time which is to me presenting,/ shew that I may in time gain your love with sweet con-tenting." The maiden then agrees to marry him and they do. The narrator ends by praising this marriage in which both gained something: he—money—and she—a loyal husband. But it also warns young maids to: "Try before you trust, be careful in consenting."

Form
The ballad is arranged in play-like fashion in that it employs two speakers, each with their own part and set of lines. The form of each speaker's part includes five lines—two rhyming couplets concluded with an exact repetition of line 4. The rhyme scheme is: A,A,B,B,B.

== Historical Basis ==
In addition to the ballad's likeness to Shirley's "The Changes, or, Love in a Maze," the subtitle, "Love in a Maze" is perhaps most recognized in the amatory fiction piece written by Eliza Haywood in 1725, nearly a century after the ballad and play's first publications. Though Shirley's play, the broadside ballad, and Haywood's novella do not retell exactly the same plot line, themes of witty lover engagement, sexual awakening, and lascivious practices are apparent in all three.

And though more is usually known about the ballad's tune in ballad scholarship, there is little known about either "The True Lovers Delight" or "The Cambridge Horn." Neither are cataloged in Chappell's Popular Music of Olden Time or Simpson's The British Broadside Ballad and its Music.

== See also ==
- The Despairing Lover, English broadside ballad
