= Sarah Fyge Egerton =

English poet (1668–1723)

- Born: 1668; London
- Died: 13 February 1723 (aged 54–55)
- Occupation: Poet
- Spouse(s): Edward Field; Thomas Egerton
- Relatives: Rebecca Alcock (mother); Thomas Fyge (father); Mary Beacham (stepmother)
- Writing career
- Notable work: The Female Advocate (1686)

Sarah Fyge Egerton (1668–1723) was an English poet who wrote in the late seventeenth and early eighteenth centuries. In her works The Female Advocate and Poems on Several Occasions, Egerton wrote about gender, friendship, marriage, religion, education, politics, and other topics. She is chiefly known as the spirited teen who responded in defense of women to Robert Gould's misogynist satire.

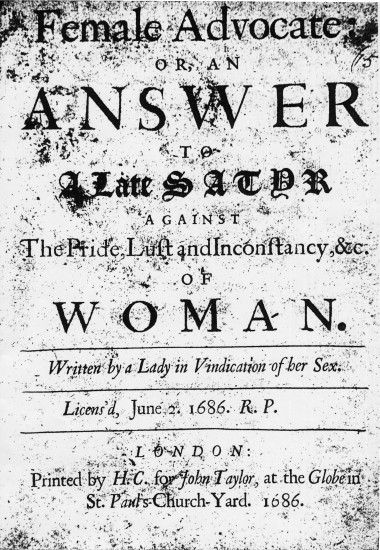
Title page, Egerton, The Female Advocate, 1686

== Life ==
Sarah Fyge was born in London and baptized on 20 December 1668. She was the daughter of Thomas Fyge (d. 1705) and his first wife Rebecca Alcock (d. 1672). Alcock died when Egerton was three years old and she was raised by her father's second wife, Mary Beacham (d. 1704). Fyge, in addition to being an apothecary in London, was a descendant of the Figge family of Winslow, Buckinghamshire, from which he inherited a plot of land. As the daughter of a landowning apothecary, Egerton had the benefit of living in a relatively wealthy environment. Based on her family's wealth and references found within her works, it appears that she had some education, whether formal or informal, in fields such as mythology, philosophy, and geography. When she was 14 years old, Egerton wrote her most popular work, The Female Advocate (1686). The Female Advocate is a poem written in response to Robert Gould's Love Given O'er: Or a Satyr on the Inconstancy of Woman, which accuses women of being a source of evil. Upon the publication of a second edition of The Female Advocate, Thomas Fyge banished his daughter from their London home, and she went to live with family members in Winslow, Buckinghamshire. Egerton later recalled this tumultuous time in her poem "On my leaving London," included in her collection Poems on Several Occasions (1703).

Sarah Fyge was married two times, first to attorney Edward Field in the late 1680s or early 1690s. Egerton was reluctant to enter into the marriage and describes her concerns in the poem "On my wedding Day." However, the marriage was brief, ended by Edward's death sometime before 1700. She went on to marry her much older second cousin Thomas Egerton, a widowed clergyman who presided over Adstock, Buckinghamshire. Both before and during her second marriage, Egerton maintained feelings for Henry Pierce, an associate of her first husband. She wrote him many letters, and she addresses him as "Alexis" in several poems. The Egertons' marriage was well known for its open hostility, and in 1703 they filed for divorce, but for one reason or another it was not granted. The author Delarivier Manley and Egerton had a genial relationship at one time; however, Egerton's testimony against Manley in a trial marked the beginning of a period of animosity. By 1709, Manley openly criticised Egerton and her second marriage in The New Atalantis with lines like, "Her face protects her chastity," and a scene featuring a violent fight during which Sarah threw a pie at her husband. Manley's infamous commentary upon Egerton and her marriage appear to mark the end of Egerton's public life. Few, if any, references can be found about her aside from the inscription of her name on her husband's burial monument in 1720 and the record of her own death 13 February 1723.

In her will made in 1721 (with two codicils in 1722), Egerton asked to be buried either in Winslow church or Westminster Abbey. She made bequests to the poor of Winslow, Adstock, and Shenley (Bucks), where she owned property probably inherited from her first husband. There were numerous bequests to various friends and relatives, including her three sisters. She also specified: "Six Ladys to bear the Pall each to have 20s Ring enameld with white wrote within only remember Clarinda 1721." The sole executor and apparently the main beneficiary was Thomas Aldridge.

== Works ==
Like many other 17th- and 18th-century women authors, Egerton probably shared her work amongst a coterie of female poets. She states in her dedication to the Earl of Hallifax in Poems on Several Occasions (1703), "They [her poems] never were abroad before, nor e'er seen but by my own sex, some of which have favour'd me with their compliments." At times her works were not only reviewed by her peers, but were also part of collaborative pieces like The Nine Muses—an elegiac tribute to John Dryden. She is best known for her own work The Female Advocate (1686), which argued against social customs that she felt restricted female freedom. In the dedication to Poems on Several Occasions, Egerton wrote that love was "the only proper theme" for women. Her lasting legacy, however, derives from for her works advocating women's rights.

=== The Female Advocate ===
Egerton first entered the literary world with her publication of The Female Advocate (1686), a defiant response to Robert Gould's Love Given O're: Or, A Satyr Against the Pride, Lust and Inconstancy of Women (1682). She responds to Gould's misogynistic endeavours to, "Discover all their [women] various sorts of vice,/The Rules by which they ruine and intice,/Their folly, Falshood, lux'ry, Lust, and Pride." Her reply in heroic couplets not only challenges the merit of his claim, but goes farther to suggest that women are in fact the superior sex because, when found alone, man is "A barren Sex and insignificant" and "So Heaven made Woman to supply the want,/And to make perfect what before was scant" Egerton also argued that it was the same God that created both men and women, and in doing so applied generally accepted theological points to counter Gould's argument. The second edition of her work in 1687 featured the same arguments, but underwent heavy editing and almost doubled in length.

=== Poems on Several Occasions ===
Egerton's Poems on Several Occasions Together with a Pastoral (1703) contains many of her best known pieces. Unlike The Female Advocate, this work consists of 56 individual poems. Many of these poems are loosely biographical and continue to challenge gender stereotypes as she did in The Female Advocate. She also addresses love, especially within the context of her personal life. The works related to female advocacy address the right for females to receive education, female equality or superiority, and the roles women should have in society. Poems concerning love express doubt and emotional vulnerability while in love.

== Selections from Poems on Several Occasions ==
=== "To Philaster" ===
"To Philaster", consists of twenty-two lines in which the speaker shifts between fond reminiscence of the love she shared with Philaster (a moniker for a lover appearing in several of Egerton's works) and attacks upon his character as a deceiver. The work begins by calling Philaster a "perjur'd Youth" and likening his passion to a "disease." The speaker then recalls that Philaster "had innocence when [he] was mine", suggesting that perhaps the memory of his passion was, according to Medoff, a comfort to her. The tone returns to remonstrance a few lines later, "Perjur'd imposing youth, cheat who you will,/Supply deficit of Truth with amourous skill" (19–20). The final lines of the poem suggest that the speaker acknowledges Philaster's deceitfulness, but she also claims her experience to be exceptional. She believes that the "first ardour of thy soul was all possessed by me" (22). The piece reveals Egerton's ability to capture uncertainty and emotional vulnerability in love.

=== "Emulation" ===
"Emulation" is a thirty nine-line poem written in heroic couplets that challenges the "tyrant Custom" that makes females "in every state a slave" (4). The speaker indicts the social construct of women being confined to subservient roles within society: "The nurse, the mistress, parent" (5). She believes that men deliberately place women in such roles to prevent females from receiving educations, because males "fear [that] we should excel their sluggish parts,/Should we attempt the science and arts" (19–20). In other words, she suggests that if given the chance, females would not only equal men in learning, but also surpass them. The piece argues that there is no legitimate reason for women to serve menial roles based on their gender, because they are as capable as men to perform any role requiring intellectual prowess. The poem ends on a positive note, suggesting that women will eventually educate themselves, and that when they do "Wit's empire now shall know a female reign" (33), ending the monopoly males enjoyed over the intellectual realm.

=== "To Marina" ===
"To Marina", written in heroic couplets, is a complaint against a woman that spoke against progressive female attitudes—a recurrent argumentative stance amongst Egerton's group of peers.

=== "The Liberty" ===
"The Liberty" opens with "Shall I be one, of those obsequious fools,/That square there lives, by customs scanty rules" (1–2). The poem builds upon the theme that rules of custom are inadequate, and that adherence to such rules is servile obedience. The poem expresses frustration with the educational system that inculcates customs designed to reflect adherence to proper form rather than intellectual knowledge. The poem is especially sensitive to the customs that dictate the roles women play within society.

== Publications ==
- Female Advocate or, an Answer to a Late Satyr Against the Pride, Lust and Inconstancy, c. of Woman. Written by a Lady in Vindication of her Sex (1686)
- Poems on Several Occasions (1703)

== E-texts ==
- Sarah Fyge Egerton at the Eighteenth-Century Poetry Archive (ECPA)
- Female Advocate or, an Answer to a Late Satyr Against the Pride, Lust and Inconstancy, &c. of Woman. Written by a Lady in Vindication of her Sex
- "The Emulation"
- "The Repulse to Alcander"
- "To Philaster"
