= Sarah Piers =

Sarah, Lady Piers (fl. 1697 – 1714; died 1719) was an English literary patron, political commentator, and a poet.

Her father was originally of Roydon in Yorkshire. She was the daughter of Matthew Roydon and wife of Sir George Piers (1670–1720), a Kentish army captain and Clerk of the Privy Seal. She had two sons, one of whom died in childhood. She is now known mainly for being one of The Nine Muses, a close friend and patron of Catherine Trotter, and a target of satire for Delarivier Manley.

She and Catherine Trotter had a long history of correspondence, private and public: Trotter invited Piers to contribute to The Nine Muses; Piers wrote a dedicatory poem to Trotter's The Fatal Friendship (1698) and a prefatory poem to her The Unhappy Penitent (1701); Trotter dedicated her comedy Love at a Loss (1701) to Piers. Manley satirised both writers, in the second volume of The New Atalantis (1709), as part of a "cabal" of women who carried their friendships "beyond with Nature design'd" (Greer 445).

In an untitled poem published in 1708, Piers praises the virtue of the female community at Tunbridge Wells. In her last known work, George for Britain, she championed the monarchy over republicanism.

== Writings ==
- "To my much Esteemed Friend on her Play call'd Fatal-Friendship." Reprinted in Kissing the Rod: An Anthology of Seventeenth-Century Women's Verse. Germaine Greer et al., eds. New York: Farrar Straus Giroux, 1988. 446–447.
- George for Britain (1714)
- "Urania: The Divine Muse. On the Death of John Dryden, Esq. By the Honourable the Lady P[iers]." The Nine Muses, Or, Poems Written by Nine severall Ladies Upon the death of the late Famous John Dryden, Esq. London: Richard Basset, 1700. Reprinted in Kissing the Rod: An Anthology of Seventeenth-Century Women's Verse. Germaine Greer et al., eds. New York: Farrar Straus Giroux, 1988. 448–451.
