= Nine Muses =

Nine Muses may refer to:

- The nine Muses of Greek mythology
- Nine Muses (band), a South Korean girl group
- The Nine Muses, an elegiac volume of poetry published in 1700
- Nine letters written by Aeschines
