= Fantomina =

1725 novel by Eliza Haywood

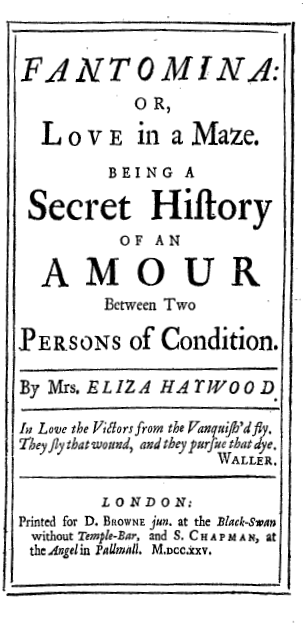
Title page for the first publication of Fantomina in 1725

Fantomina; or, Love in a Maze is a novel (Note: The work is referred to variously as a "novel", "novella", or a "piece of short fiction" by scholars.) by the English writer and actress Eliza Haywood, published in 1725. In it, the protagonist disguises herself as four different women in her efforts to understand how a man may interact with each individual persona. Part of the tradition of amatory fiction is to rewrite the story of the persecuted maiden into a story of feminine power and sexual desire.

== Plot summary ==
The story opens in a playhouse in London where the unnamed main character, intrigued by the men at the theater and the attention they pay to the prostitutes there, decides to pretend being a prostitute herself. Disguised, she especially enjoys talking with Beauplaisir, whom she has encountered before, though previously constrained by her social status's formalities. He, not recognizing her, and believing her favors to be for sale, asks to meet her. She demurs and puts him off until the next evening.

In preparation, she rents lodgings and then meets him at the theater the following night. They go to the house and have dinner. Meanwhile, the protagonist realizes that Beauplaisir wants to have sex and she tries to resist him by telling him she is a virgin. However, he is too aroused and does not listen to her protests, and he rapes her.

Afterwards, she is despondent and rejects his money, which confuses Beauplaisir, who did not believe her protestations being serious. Worried about her reputation, she gives her name as "Fantomina".

Soon, however, Beauplaisir tires of her and leaves for Bath. Though she continues to employ the ruse of "Fantomina," the protagonist drops this alias for a short time to pursue Beauplaisir to Bath. Dressed as a country maid, she obtains employment at the inn where he is staying, taking the name Celia. When Beauplaisir sees her, he believes her to be a new maid, and makes romantic overtures. The protagonist plots this encounter carefully and Beauplaisir's every reaction is drawn from him by her manipulation, but the lover believes he has ravished her in spite of some protest on her part. He gives her some money in recompense.

He leaves Bath after about a month, tired of Celia. On his way home, he encounters Mrs. Bloomer, who is the protagonist dressed as a widow, and invites her into his carriage. Her grief prompts him to try to raise her spirits, which results in them having sex in an inn along the way.

When this identity again begins to lose favor with him, the heroine sends Beauplaisir a letter, signed "Incognita," declaring her undying love and passion for him. She writes there is nothing she will refuse him, except the sight of her face. They meet and she, wearing a mask, agrees to sleep with him in the dark. Beauplaisir keeps up each of these affairs, never realizing they are the same woman. The protagonist becomes pregnant and after she gives birth her mother insists she name the father. When Beauplaisir arrives, he does not know who she is until she tells her story in full. At the end, her mother sends her to live in a monastery in France.

== Major themes ==
Fantomina explores a variety of themes, almost none of which come without literary dispute and controversy. Its unnamed protagonist's game of disguise touches on everything from gender roles, to identity, to sexual desire. Even more so, her inability or unwillingness to seduce Beauplaisir as her true self, heavily implied as a product of a respected social status, also touches on the issue of class in 18th century British society. In the infancy of the British novel genre as a whole, the theme of characters using dress to create deceptive new identities was prominent.

=== Gender ===
One of the most sweeping themes throughout Fantomina is gender, and its role in shaping the dynamics between Fantomina, Beauplaisir, and the different sects of societies they find themselves in. There are clear challenges to gender normative behavior Haywood is making throughout the story, while also portraying an honest depiction of the disparity between male and female social standings. Fantomina manipulates the constraints put on her because of her gender to satisfy her desire for sex, already thought to be an inherently masculine desire to have. To seduce Beauplaisir, Fantomina adopts multiple feminine disguises, enabling her to paradoxically act out a masculine libertine identity. This sharply contrasts the wits that are necessary to fool him, which Fantomina demonstrates. Clearly this challenges the notion that women are intellectually or sexually subdued. Other scholars suggest that Beauplaisir was not so easily fooled, but that Fantomina's skills as a performer allowed her to repeatedly seduce him.

But, given the fact that Beauplaisir escapes the end of the novella unaffected, irresponsible for the consequences of his affairs, Haywood hits readers with a dose of reality regarding gender inequalities. Despite the fact that men are easily manipulated, sexually promiscuous, predictable and even foolish, as Haywood seems to argue, they are still regarded as the superior gender.

=== Class ===
Fantomina's economic and social standing is portrayed in an interesting light, because her privilege seems to be more of a constraint on her than it is a benefit. This critiques the standards placed on women especially, coming from an elite background. She feels more comfortable coming forward with her sexuality in disguise at a brothel than she would at a party with her fellow middle-class men and women. Lowering her class, where there is less concern over a high-society marriage opportunity, and virginity is less of a critical concern, allots her the freedom she wants.

However, there is never an interaction between separate classes throughout the novella, rather a constant shifting throughout them. So, Fantomina enjoys all of the "benefits" of coming from a lower class, without having to endure the actual economic constraints.

=== Desire ===
Especially at the time of its publication, a woman's sexual desire was thought to be muted, even nonexistent. Sexual pursuits of any kind were thought to be a man's game, left for a woman to indulge or deny. Fantomina so obviously challenges the standing ideas of what desire looks like and who it can come from. Beauplaisir can be quite forward and open with his desire for whomever Fantomina is impersonating. And while her desires have to be publicly subdued throughout the story, she is the one orchestrating their sexual encounters. Some even argue that this desire is expressed through performance.

=== Dress ===
Women's dress was seen as a form of deception in Fantomina. Because of this deception that the main character repeatedly takes part in, she is able to have power over the man.

== Genre and style ==
Haywood's story "radically rewrites" the typical "persecuted maiden" story of the early eighteenth century. The heroine is introduced as "A young lady of distinguished Birth, Beauty, Wit, and Spirit" visiting London from the country, who is "young, a Stranger to the World, and consequently to the Dangers of it; and having no Body in Town, at that Time, to whom she was oblig’d to be accountable for her Actions, did in every Thing as her Inclinations or Humour render’d most agreeable to her". The reader thus expects the heroine to be seduced and reach a tragic end; such stories often taught readers about the dangers of "vulnerability, willfulness, and lack of guidance". In Fantomina, however, the heroine does not die nor is she disgraced (the typical endings). Instead, Haywood uses the disguise, wit, and sexual freedom common to Restoration comedies to show the similarities between the two genres, one tragic and the other comic. While Fantomina falls for Beauplaisir, like other maidens, she is also a heroine with an explicit sexual desire. As critic Margaret Croskery writes, Haywood "refuses to define female sexual virtue in terms of chastity or a victimized sexual objecthood…. Instead, she defines virtuous love in terms of sincerity and constancy".

Fantomina's ending, neither true to the "persecuted maiden" genre nor true to the marriages of Restoration comedies, is ambiguous. Fantomina purposefully establishes and iterates serial subjectivity, or the practice of someone who reinvent themselves in order to subvert cultural norms, and this allows Haywood to comment on these norms. This would have shocked its readers. As one editor of the text writes, "where the traditional moral might be expected, this story ends with a casual delight in 'an Intrigue, which, considering the Time it lasted, was as full of Variety as any, perhaps, that many Ages has produced'".

Fantomina also draws from the culture of the political pornography of the seventeenth century, which unflatteringly portrayed London commoners as the source of democratic unrest and protest. In the 1720s, Robert Walpole was attempting to limit the franchise in London. However, the political pornography of this time reversed the typical structure of these stories by portraying him as the villainous seducer and London as the "violated maiden". Like these stories, Fantomina's heroine "ultimately triumph[s] over those who would self-servingly exploit the favors of London's commons”.

== Characters ==
=== Fantomina ===
Fantomina is the first disguise the protagonist uses. Initially just wanting to see what it's like, she eventually encounters Beauplaisir and, after some misgivings after raping her, falls in love with her. However, Fantomina's charm quickly wears off and he leaves her.

=== Celia ===
This is the second identity that the protagonist uses. Beauplaisir moves to Bath, the protagonist follows him, and takes on the identity of a country girl working as a maid. There, she seduces Beauplaisir without him realizing being persuaded. Soon, Beauplaisir gets tired of Celia, and leaves.

=== Mrs. Bloomer ===
The protagonist's third disguise, Mrs. Bloomer is a recent widow that Beauplaisir meet after she 'lost her way back to London'. After a trist at an inn, the disguise loses favor when she realizes Beauplaisir wants to see Fantomina.

=== Incognita ===
The protagonist's final identity, used by her to captivate Beauplaisir anew. Incognita sends Beauplaisir a letter promising an ardent lover if he can accept the condition of her not revealing her true name or face. She keeps her mysterious air by wearing a mask and meeting with him only in the dark. The protagonist does not receive the opportunity to fully play out this identity's trick before her enterprise come to an end with the return of her mother.

=== Beauplaisir ===
He is an aristocratic male enticed multiple times into a sexual relationship with the same woman wearing different disguises. Though he knows the protagonist, he does not recognize her in any of her false identities. Due to the sexual nature of their relationship, Beauplaisir unknowingly gets the protagonist pregnant. The truth is revealed to him through the protagonist's mother. At first he promises to look after the child, but then, by the mother's choice, is "ensued from these Civilities" and leaves the infant with her.

== Publication and reception ==
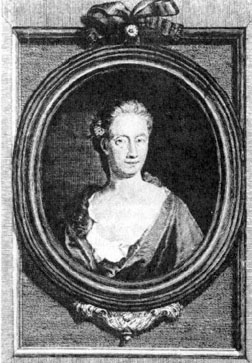
Eliza Haywood was one of the four bestselling authors of the first half of the eighteenth century.

Fantomina was first published in 1725 in the second edition of Haywood's collected works, which was entitled Secret Histories, Novels, and Poems. Although Haywood was a popular writer at the time, few of her works were republished between the eighteenth century and 1963. The reasons for this have to do with gender, "the bias against didactic and popular literature, ... Haywood’s complicated experiments with genre", and the way that the history of the novel has been told in literary studies. However, since the rise of feminist literary criticism, Haywood's works and those of other early eighteenth-century female novelists have received attention from scholars and Fantomina has appeared in several anthologies since the 1980s.

== Adaptation for stage ==
In 2016 the book was adapted into a farcical comedy for stage by Godfrey&West. A brief run at the ADC Theatre using the title "Love in a Maze" saw the show receive 4-star reviews from both Varsity and Cambridge Theatre Review. The show enjoyed further success the next year at the Edinburgh Fringe Festival under the name "Bad Habits", again receiving 4-star reviews during its two-week run.

The show follows faithfully the encounters of Fantomina and Beauplaisir as described in the original novella, although the story is presented by a cast of nuns living at the monastery where Fantomina has been since the end of the novella. The ending of the play therefore drifts dramatically from the original ending, hinting at "a heart-warmingly cheesy message of ‘being true to oneself’, only to rapidly shed this momentary serious message to give way to an explosively theatrical ending." Productions of the show require minimal set and a small cast of 6 actors, as well as a solo violinist who is present on stage throughout the performance.

== Bibliography ==
- Ballaster, Ros. Seductive Forms: Women’s Amatory Fiction from 1684 to 1740. Oxford: Clarendon Press, 1992. Print. ISBN 0-19-811244-0.
- Croskery, Margaret Case. "Masquerading Desire: The Politics of Passion in Eliza Haywood’s Fantomina." The Passionate Fictions of Eliza Haywood: Essays on Her Life and Work. Eds. Kirsten T. Saxton and Rebecca P. Bocchicchio. Lexington: University Press of Kentucky, 2000. ISBN 0-8131-2161-2.
- Croskery, Margaret Case and Anna C. Patchias. "Introduction." Fantomina and Other Works. Peterborough: Broadview Press, 2004. ISBN 1-55111-524-7.
- Merritt, Juliette. "Peepers, Picts, and Female Masquerade: Performances of the Female Gaze in Fantomina; or, Love in a Maze." Beyond Spectacle: Eliza Haywood’s Female Spectators. Toronto: University of Toronto Press, 2004. ISBN 0-8020-3540-X.
- Mowry, Melissa. "Eliza Haywood's Defense of London's Body Politic". SEL: Studies in English Literature 1500–1900 43.3 (Summer 2003): 645–665.
- Pettit, Alexander; Croskery, Margaret C.; Patchias, Anna C. (2004). Fantomina and Other Works. Peterborough, Ont.: Broadview Press. p. 24. ISBN 1-55111-524-7.
- Potter, Tiffany. (2003) "The language of feminised sexuality: gendered voice in Eliza Haywood's Love in Excess and fantomina" Women's Writing. 10. p. 169-186. ISSN 0969-9082
- Saxton, Kirsten T.; Bocchicchio, Rebecca P. (2000). The Passionate Fictions of Eliza Haywood : Essays on Her Life And Work. Lexington, Ky.: Univ. Press of Kentucky. p. 72. ISBN 0-8131-2161-2.
