= The Nine Muses =

Elegiac volume of poetry

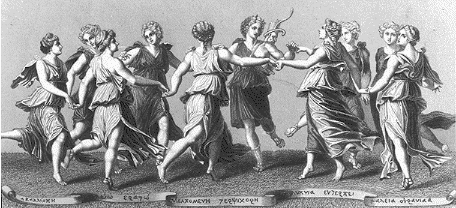
"Apollo Dancing with the Muses" by Francesco Bartolozzi

The Nine Muses, Or, Poems Written by Nine severall Ladies Upon the death of the late Famous John Dryden, Esq. (London: Richard Basset, 1700) was an elegiac volume of poetry published pseudonymously. The contributors were English women writers, each of whom signed their poems with the name of one of the Muses. The collection was edited by Delarivier Manley (who wrote as "Melpomene" and "Thalia") and includes pieces by Susanna Centlivre ("perhaps," according to Blain et al.), Sarah Fyge Egerton ("Erato", "Euterpe", and "Terpsichore"), Mary Pix ("Clio"), Catherine Trotter ("Calliope"), and Sarah Piers ("Urania"). The poet writing as "Polimnia" (the Muse of Rhetorick) has not been identified; her initials are "Mrs. D. E."

== Text ==
- Transcription of The Nine muses, or, Poems written by nine several ladies upon the death of the late famous John Dryden, Esq (1700) (Oxford Text Archive)
