= Rosalind Ballaster =

Scholar and professor

Rosalind Margaret Ballaster (born 1962 in Bombay) is a scholar of 18th-century literature and a specialist in Georgian theatre. A Professor at Mansfield College, Oxford, she is a winner of the British Academy's Rose Mary Crawshay Prize for 2006.

== Life ==
Rosalind (Ros) Ballaster obtained first class honours B.A. degree in English Language and Literature in 1984 from St Hilda's College, Oxford. In 1989, she received a doctorate in English Literature at St Cross College, Oxford. She was a visiting fellow at Harvard University (1988–1989). She joined Mansfield College as a lecturer in 1993 and became a professor in 2009. Between 2017 and 2021, she was the head of the Faculty of English Language and Literature at Oxford University. She established the Women's Studies master's degree at Oxford.

== Academics ==
Ballaster's 1992 work Seductive Forms documented the transition of public perception of women from the 17th century's strong, lusty, 'natural' to the 18th century's pale, passive and retiring creatures, as evidenced in the literary productions of Aphra Behn, Delarivier Manley and Eliza Haywood. In society's view, she claimed, women writing for profit was equivalent to selling their wares (i.e., their bodies), and these writers thereby increased their sales. In particular, early amatory fiction and its representation of class and gender was driven by the writers' political views. The split between Tory and Whig viewpoints was demonstrated by Behn and Manley (who sought Tory patronage): a female victim of love would have a beheaded Stuart king, for example, or the suffering of a virtuous woman might parallel the troubles of a Catholic. But where Behn's viewpoint moved between the male gaze and female feeling, and Manley might satirise the Whigs for corruption, Haywood would reduce the scope of women's agency to the domestic, passive and punished if they rebelled.

In 2005, Ballaster published two books (Fables of the East: Selected Tales 1662–1785; Fabulous Orients: Fictions of the East in England 1662–1785) on literature from Asia, its influence on English literature and the reimagining of the East by the British in the 17th and 18th centuries. She showed the transmission of the stories into French and thence to English, covering not only notable works such as Galland's Arabian Nights, but also less known ones from Eliza Haywood and Giovanni Paolo Marana. A critic noted that while stories with narrative energy and good writing tended to be well-received, those that extravagantly adopted orientalist tropes (harems, castrations and their ilk), as exemplified by Haywood's History of the Christian Eunuch or James Ridleys' The Adventures of Urad, have travelled less well, despite Ballaster's championing. She also set the stage for the various uses of the stories – social, religious or political commentary or satire, and expanded both the range of texts and sources across the two books.

In 2019, she began a project Opening the Edgeworth Papers, investigating the archive of papers of Maria Edgeworth at the Bodleian library.

== Selected works ==
- Fictions of Presence: Theatre and Novel in Eighteenth-Century Britain. Boydell & Brewer. 2020. ISBN 9781783275588.
- Ballaster, Ros, ed. (2010). The History of British Women's Writing, 1690-1750. Palgrave Macmillan. ISBN 978-0-230-54938-8.
- Fabulous Orients: Fictions of the East in England, 1662-1785. Oxford: Oxford University Press. 2005.
- Fables of the East: Selected Tales 1662-1785. Oxford: Oxford University Press. 2005.
- Seductive Forms: Women's Amatory Fiction 1684–1740. Oxford: Oxford University Press. 1992.
