= The Despairing Lover =

Song

The Despairing Lover is an English broadside ballad from the late-17th century, written by Edward Ford. It is about a man who loses his lover and vows to kill himself, until she saves him by returning at the end of the ballad. It is paired with A Constant and Kind Maid, in which the woman becomes the man's constant and loving wife. Sung to the tune of Fortune My Foe or Aim Not Too High, though according to William Chappell there is some controversy over the compatibility of these tunes. Copies of the broadside can be found at the British Library, the National Library of Scotland, and Magdalene College, Cambridge. On-line facsimile transcriptions are also available for public consumption.

== Synopsis ==
The ballad is told from the perspective of a man who has despaired of life because he has lost his lover. He laments that he is dying of a broken heart, that he is going to become a poor pilgrim and wander the earth telling strangers of his miseries, and that he wishes he could find a deserted place where nobody had ever been before. He says his woman used to be loving, but then her smiles turned to frowns. Even though summer returns after winter, his lover will never return. Finally, when he decides to simply end his life by stabbing himself with a dagger, his lover runs toward him, smiling and blushing, and tells him not to do it. In the final stanza, the narrator tells all maidens to listen closely the end of the story, where he proves himself true and she comforts him.
