= The fair triumvirate of wit =

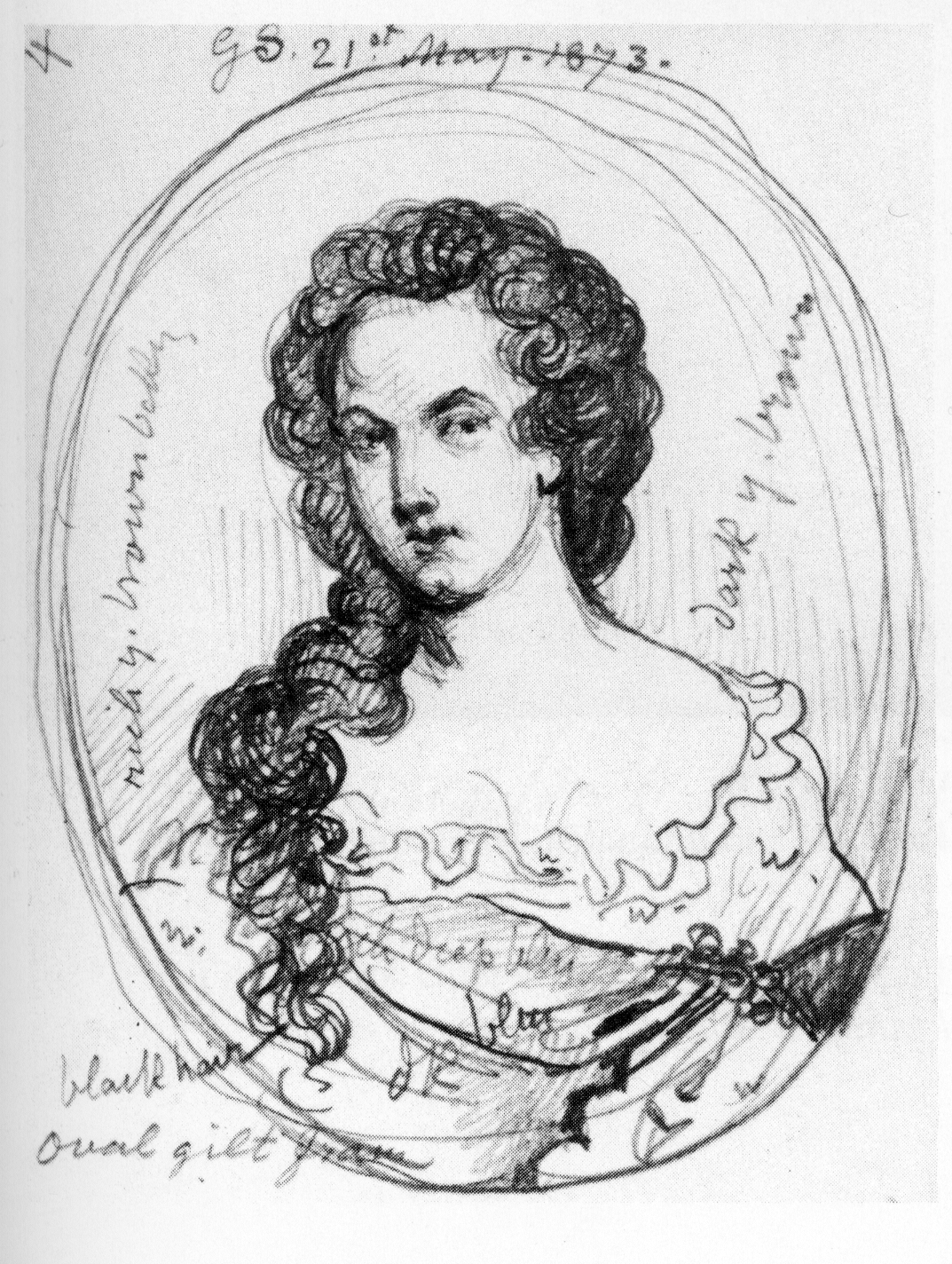
Aphra Behn sketched by George Scharf

Eliza Haywood (engraving by George Vertue)

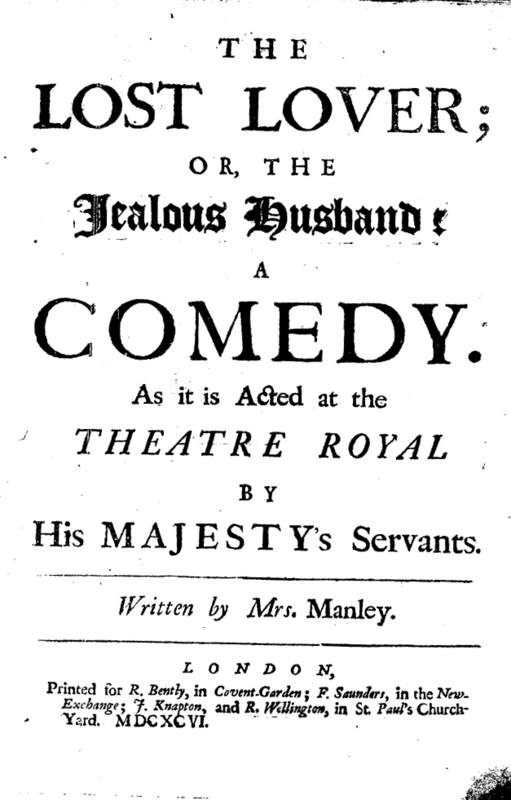
Title page of Delarivier Manley's The Lost Lover

The fair triumvirate of wit is a title given to the three 17th–18th century English women authors Eliza Haywood, Delarivier Manley and Aphra Behn.

== Term and usage ==
The term was coined by poet-critic Rev. James Sterling in a dedicatory verse to Haywood's Secret Histories, Novels, and Poems, and acknowledges the authors' stature as the three most influential women writers of the time. Subsequent feminist literary criticism has helped restore their work–which includes plays, poetry, novels, and essays–to prominence. As the verse appears in the dedication to Haywood's book, it is perhaps unsurprising that Sterling positions her as the most impressive of the three, writing:

Pathetic (Note: "Pathetic" here is used in an obsolete sense meaning "affecting the feeling"; see pathos.) Behn, or Manley's greater Name;
Forget their Sex, and own when Haywood writ,
She clos'd the Fair triumvirate of Wit.
