= Almyna: or, The Arabian Vow. A Tragedy =

1706 play by Delarivier Manley

Almyna is a she-tragedy that was written during the Restoration by Delarivier Manley. The play was first performed in 1706, and in the following year it was published. In the play's preface, Manley characterizes the play as a fable, noting her primary influences for the play as the life of Caliph Valid Almanzor, as well as The Arabian Nights' Entertainments, which was translated into French by Antoine Galland in 1704.

== List of Characters ==
Caliph Almanzor: Sultan of Eastern Arabia
Abdalla, Sultan's brother
The Grand Vizier, father to Almyna and Zoradia
Alhador, Chief of the Dervis
Morat, Chief of the Eunuchs
Almyna, eldest daughter to the Grand Vizier
Zoradia, sister to Almyna, youngest daughter to the Grand Vizier

== Plot summary ==
The sultan of eastern Arabia, Caliph Almanzor, has just executed his wife for committing adultery with one of her slaves. The sultan is so enraged over his wife's infidelity that he resolves to take revenge on all women by taking a new, virginal wife every night, and then executing her on the following morning. Now that the sultaness has been executed, the sultan no longer has an heir to the throne, so makes his brother Abdalla his heir. He expects Abdalla to adopt the same marriage practices that he does, but Abdalla is in love with Almyna, the Grand Vizier's eldest daughter. In Act 1, Abdalla and The Grand Vizier ask for the sultan's blessing so that Abdalla and Almyna can begin their courtship, arguing that if the sultan "Cou'd . . . but read Almyna's noble soul" and see that she is "wise and good" then he would gladly give his blessing on the match (1.1.266, 269). The sultan hesitantly gives his blessing, concluding that "for vain, 'tis found, to Combate youthful Passions" (1.1.357).

While Abdalla asks for the sultan's blessing on his engagement, Almyna and her sister Zoradia congregate in a garden in the sultan's palace. Almyna does not speak until Act 2, when she comforts Zoradia in the garden. Zoradia is distraught but she refuses to tell Almyna why she is upset. At the end of the act she admits that she and Abdalla used to be in a secret courtship:

'Tis two years since, the Prince pretended Love,
And gain'd no easy Conquest over mine;
I charg'd him keep the Secret from my Father.
(A fault for which I have severely suffered)
Till over-come at length by his Persuasion,
I gave him Leave, to ask me of the Vizier,
Just in that fatal Moment, thou arrived'st
With thy Superior, and too dazling Charms! (2.1.349-356)

The Grand Vizier is angry with Abdalla, and desires to exact revenge on him for Zoradia, but Almyna asks her father to remain calm, reminding him that "Passions . . . seldom mend a Wrong" (3.1.17). Almyna's resolves to rekindle Abdalla's love for Zoradia, and to marry "another Lord". Later in Act 3, Almyna asks for her father's permission to go before the sultan so that she can offer herself as his next wife:

Start not at my Request, it comes from Heav'n,
From thence derived, to save the innocent Lives
Of Virgin-daughters, and their Parent's tears.
To stop the course of such Barbarity;
Dispel the fear of trembling Mothers, who
Thro' this great Empire hourly dread his Choice. (3.1.94-99)

Almyna assures her father that ultimately, she will go before the sultan with or without his blessing, because she sees this act as a divine calling and believes that she can change the sultan. The sultan agrees to see Almyna, but he is struck by her "strange Request," and "her slight regard of Life", because he does not plan to veer from his pattern of "fatal Nuptials" (4.1.5, 9). In Act 4, the sultan begins to change his attitude, and this change is first indicated in his dream where the sultan is confronted "with the Ghost of those fair Queens / Whom in the fear of jealousy" he had murdered, and at the end of the dream, the sultan is "Charg'd with the Blood of" the "Innocents" (4.1.34-35, 38). Later in Act 4, the sultan meets Almyna, and when she is unveiled before him, he confesses that he is taken back by her beauty: "Her glistering Eyes, like Lightning flash thro' mine. / All-seeing, all-commanding; how they pierce me?" Although he is mesmerized by Almyna, the sultan reminds her that he will not veer from his murdering, and asks that she consider this before she decides to marry him. Almyna presents an argument to the sultan:

I, who have left the certainty of Power,
A Crown presented by the young Abdalla,
Nay, (in Succession) all thy Crowns and Power,
Have left his bloom of Charms, his Virgin Heart,
To go in search of thine, where death requites me,
Yet cou'd I gain but this, to fall the last
That with my Life, thy cruel Vow might end,
To save thy precious Soul, so near to ruin,
And in my Blood; to wash the stains away ... (4.1.292-300)

The sultan and Almyna are wed, and the following day, in Act 5, Scene 2, Almyna is to be executed. As she kneels before the mutes who are about to strangle her, the sultan calls off the execution, and tells Almyna that the execution was ""design'd but as a Tryal," of "How far" her "bravery of Soul cou'd reach" (5.2.177-78). He admits that Almyna has changed his attitude towards women, and commits himself to her: "I am all thine: / For ever thine we're thus to part no more" (5.2.195-96).

While Almyna's trial was underway, a revolt was forming outside the palace. Abdalla rushes into the palace, and he assumes that he will save Almyna from her execution, because he is unaware that the execution was a test. Abdalla and the Grand Vizier fight, and Abdalla is mortally wounded along with Zoradia, who had come into the palace to support Abdalla. Both Abdalla and Zoradia die at the end of the play.
