= The Lost Lover (play) =

The Younger Brother
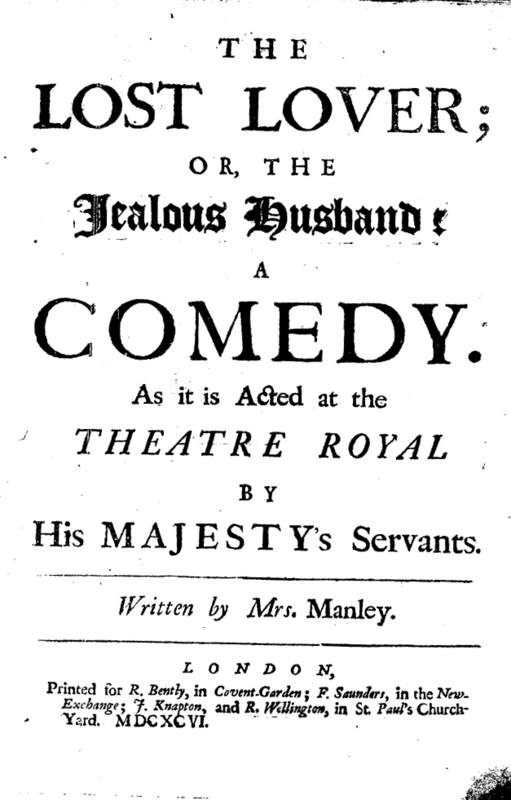
- Title page of The Lost Lover
- Original language: English
- Written by: Delarivier Manley
- Genre: Comedy

Premiere
- Date: March 1696
- Place: Theatre Royal, Drury Lane, London

The Lost Lover; or The Jealous Husband: A Comedy, Delarivier Manley's first published play, was performed in March 1696 at Theatre Royal, Drury Lane. The performance ran only three nights.

The original cast included Benjamin Johnson, John Verbruggen, Hildebrand Horden, George Powell, Colley Cibber, William Pinkethman, Joseph Haines, Mary Kent, Jane Rogers, Frances Maria Knight, Susanna Verbruggen and Margaret Mills.

== Characters ==
As listed in the original script: Men

- Sir Rustic Good-Heart, an ill-bred country gentleman
- Wilmore, Rustic's son
- Wildman, Rustic's friend
- Sir Amorous Courtall
- Smyrna, a Turkey Merchant
- Pulse, a Physician
- Knowlittle, a Fortune-teller
- Timothy, his Man
- Ready, servant to Wildman

Women

- Lady Young-Love, an Old, vain, conceited Lady
- Marina, her daughter
- Belira, secret mistress to Wilmore
- Orinda, an affected poetess
- Olivia, Smyrna's Wife
- Isabella, woman to Lady Young-Love
- Phoebe, Olivia's maid
- Page
- Servants

== Bibliography ==
- Van Lennep, W. The London Stage, 1660-1800: Volume One, 1660-1700. Southern Illinois University Press, 1960 .

== External Works ==
- Full text of The Lost Lover available at Emory Women Writers Resource Project
- The London Stage Part I
