= Fidelis Morgan =

Anglo-Irish actress and writer (born 1952)

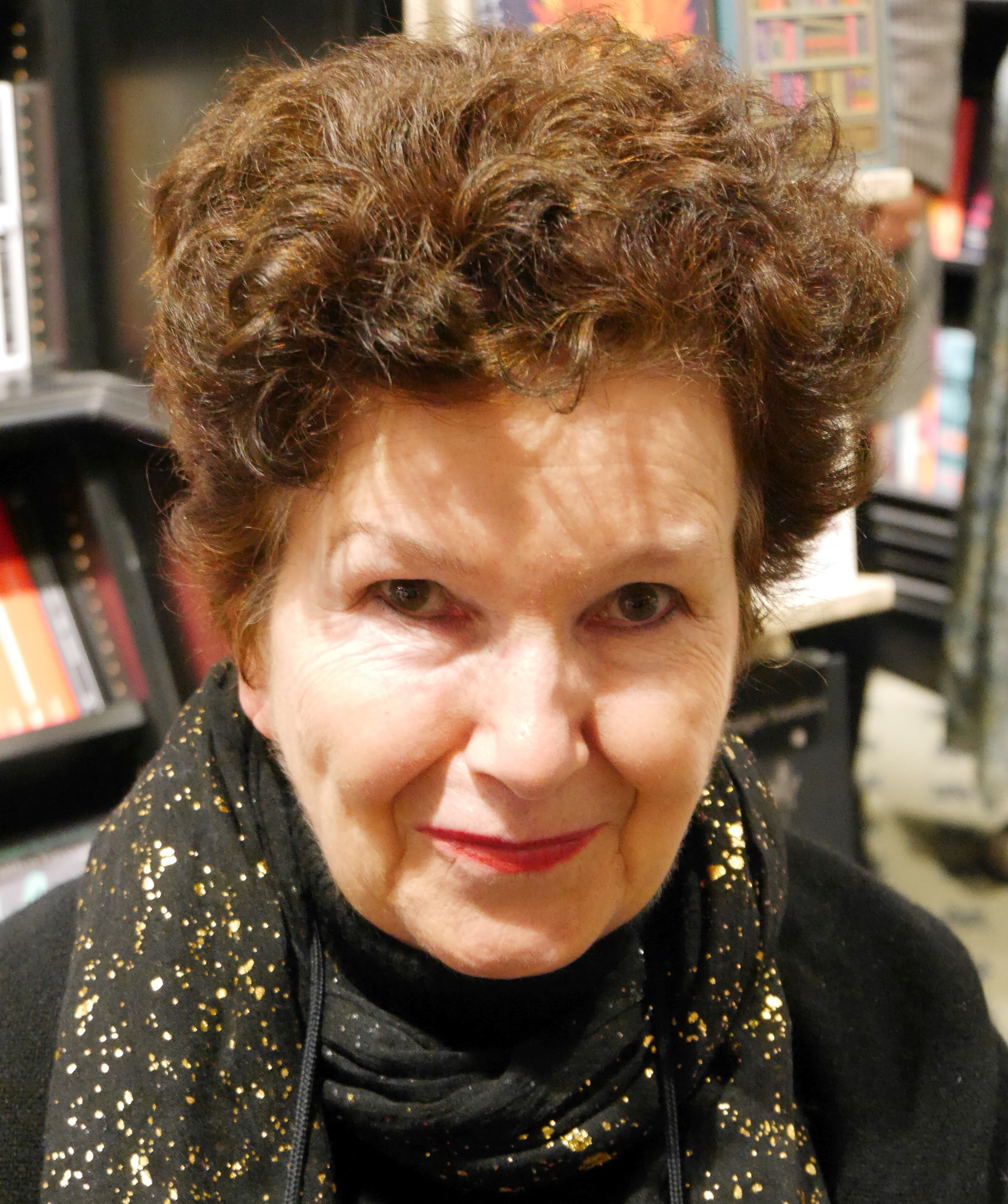
Morgan at Hatchards, Piccadilly, London, 2022

Fidelis Morgan (born 8 August 1952) is an Anglo-Irish actress, writer and director. She has performed with the Royal Shakespeare Company, the National Theatre, and in West End productions, including Noël Coward's The Vortex.

She has written stage plays based on the novels Pamela and Hangover Square. Her non-fiction works include The Female Wits, a study of female playwrights in the Restoration era and biographies of women from the 17th and 18th centuries such as Charlotte Charke. Her novels include the Countess Ashby dela Zouche series of historical crime mysteries including The Rival Queens.

== Life and career ==
Morgan was born in a "gypsy caravan" on the grounds of Amesbury Abbey in Wiltshire, near Stonehenge. Her parents, originally from Liverpool, resettled in Amesbury, where her father established a dental career and her mother pursued a passion for art. Morgan's family moved several times when she was a child, but she always thought of Liverpool as home. She studied at Farnborough Hill in Farnborough, Hampshire, and at the University of Birmingham, receiving a degree there in the Department of Drama and Theatre Arts in 1973.

=== Acting ===
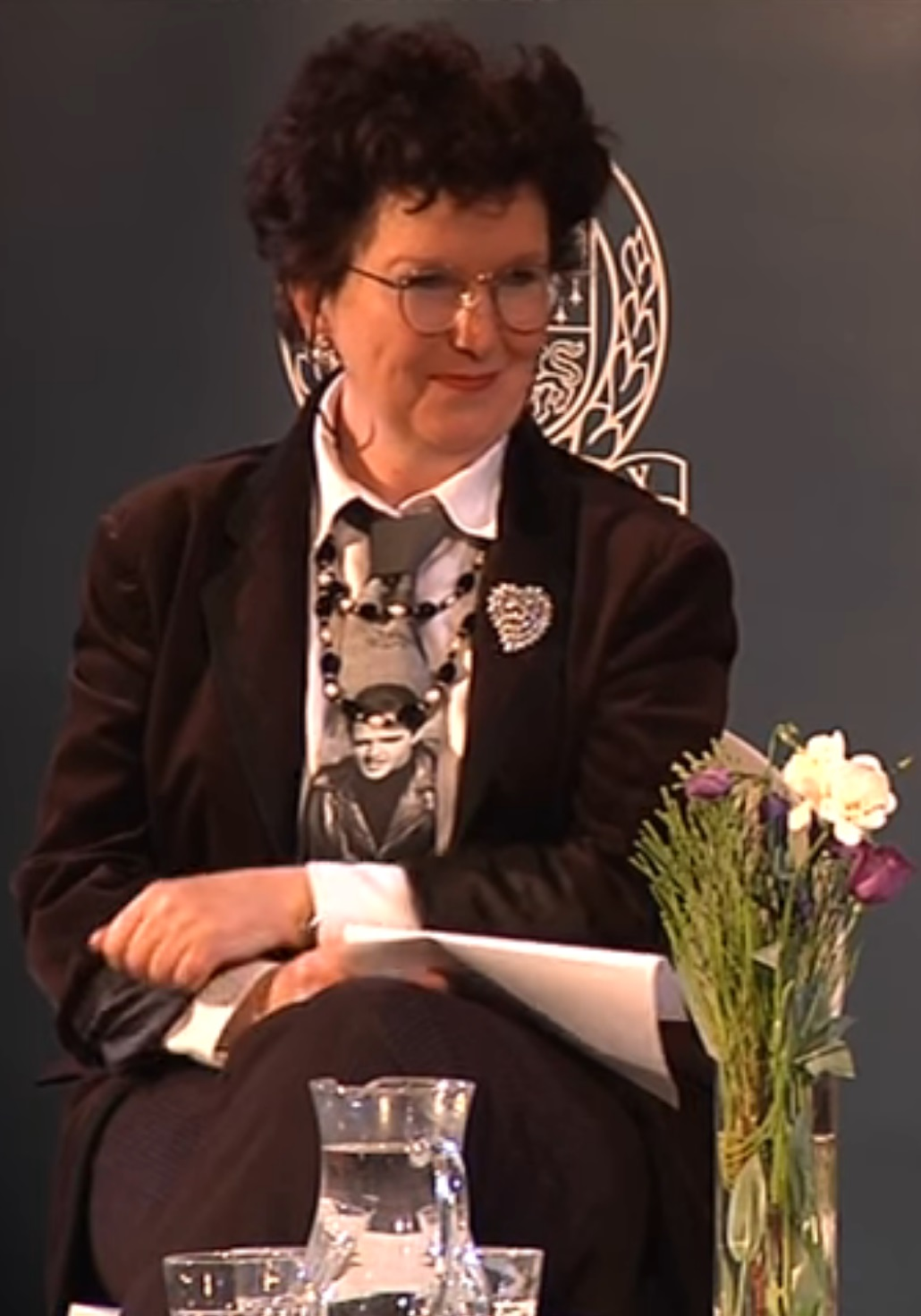
Morgan at the Cambridge Union Society Spring Wordfest in 2011

As an actress, Morgan appeared with the Royal Shakespeare Company (1975), Glenda Jackson’s company at The Old Vic (1976), the National Theatre (1986), repertory in Liverpool, Birmingham, Nottingham and Leeds (1973–1996), as well as a regular company member of the Glasgow Citizens Theatre where, among other roles, she played The Mother in The Mother by Brecht; Elizabeth in Mary Stuart by Schiller; Putana in 'Tis Pity She's a Whore by Ford; Mrs Peachum in The Threepenny Opera by Brecht; Ruth in Blithe Spirit by Coward, and Kath in Entertaining Mr Sloane by Joe Orton. She played Clara Hibbert at Citizens Theatre, and in the West End transfer, of Noël Coward's The Vortex.

Her television appearances include The Liver Birds (1974), Rachel Gold in The Politician's Wife (1995), four different roles in The Bill (1985–1998), Dorcas in As Time Goes By (1996), the Hon. Myrtle Pongleton in two episodes of Jeeves and Wooster (1991), Rosalie in four episodes of Big Women (1998), Assistant Registrar in Dead Gorgeous (2002) and was Bunty Brace-Girdle in 20 episodes of Mr Majeika (1988–1990). Her film roles include Matron in Never Let Me Go (2010), Anne in A Little Chaos (2014), and Agnes Carpenter in the TV movie Karen Carpenter: Goodbye to Love (2016).

Morgan was nominated Best Actress of the Year 1984 in The Observer for her work at Glasgow's Citizens' Theatre. Morgan has put on several 50 minute shows at the National Theatre. In 1991, her show on 'Female Playwrights of the Restoration' at the National Theatre's Cottesloe Theatre was concerned with the largely neglected plays by women dramatists written for the London stage in the late 17th and early 18th centuries. The show, subsequently entitled The Female Wits, included extracts from the plays performed by a group of actors and played at various literary festivals including the Isle of Wight, Truro, Utrecht, and on Queen Mary 2. Again at the National, in 2011, she interviewed her friend Celia Imrie on the platform of the Cottesloe Theatre.

In 2015, Morgan returned to Glasgow's Citizens' Theatre to take part in its 70th anniversary celebrations, performing an extract from Mary Stuart with Ann Mitchell.

=== Novels and non-fiction ===
Morgan's novels include the Countess Ashby dela Zouche series of historical crime mysteries: Unnatural Fire (2000), for which she was nominated as a Discovery Author by Barnes and Noble in 2001; The Rival Queens (2001); The Ambitious Stepmother (2002) and Fortune's Slave (2004). The Rival Queens was nominated for a Lefty Award for "the most humorous mystery novels published in the U.S. in 2002" by Left Coast Crime, California, in 2003. Her non-fiction work includes The Female Wits, the first study of female playwrights of the Restoration stage and biographies of charismatic female figures from the 17th and 18th centuries including Charlotte Charke.

She was the author of The Bluffer's Guide to British Theatre (1986), part of The Bluffer's Guides series.

=== Plays and teleplays ===
Morgan's stage plays include adaptations of famous novels, Samuel Richardson's Pamela and Patrick Hamilton's Hangover Square (Lyric Hammersmith, 1990, and the Finborough Theatre, London, in 2008). For her work on Pamela for Shared Experience, Morgan was nominated Most Promising Playwright in Plays and Players (1985). She collaborated with Lynda La Plante on Channel 4's Killer Net.

In 1988, she wrote and directed the sketch 'Fat Life' for Before The Act: A Celebration to Counter the Effects of Section 28. This was a gala held at the Piccadilly Theatre to protest against Section 28, which had been enacted on 24 May 1988. The programme consisted of material created on gay themes. In 1997, two of her sketches were performed in Then Again, a revue directed by Neil Bartlett at the Lyric Hammersmith.

=== Directing ===
In 2011, at the Finborough Theatre, Morgan directed a sell-out production of Lennox Robinson’s Drama at Inish starring Celia Imrie and Paul O’Grady. In the same year, she directed a reading of The Piper, a new play by Colleen Murphy at Vibrant – A Festival of Finborough Playwrights. The cast included Philip Herbert, Dudley Sutton, Christopher Webber, Julian Wadham, Siân Thomas, George Irving and Pauline Moran. In 2018, she directed a production of But It Still Goes On by Robert Graves and starring Sophie Ward and Alan Cox, again at the Finborough Theatre.

In 2014, at the St. James Theatre, Morgan directed Celia Imrie in Laughing Matters, and directed Wedlock Deadlock at the Kings Head, starring Paola Dionisotti, Sian Thomas and Celia Imrie and adapted into a musical from The Custom of the Country by Susanna Centlivre.

Also in 2014, she was Artist-in-Residence at the University of California where she directed a production of The Gambling Lady by Susanna Centlivre, a play Morgan rescued from near-oblivion in her book The Female Wits. In 2019, she directed The Wooden Meadow by Stewart Pringle at the Finborough Theatre.

== Bibliography ==
Non-fiction

- The Female Wits: Women Playwrights on the London Stage 1660–1720, Virago (1981)
- A Woman of No Character: An Autobiography of Mrs Manley, Faber (1986)
- Bluff Your Way in Theatre, Ravette (1986)
- The Well-Known Trouble Maker: A Life, Faber (1988)
- A Misogynist's Source Book, Jonathan Cape (1989)
- Female Playwrights of The Restoration: Five Comedies, ed. with Paddy Lyons, Dent Everyman (1991)
- The Female Tatler, Dent Everyman (1992)
- The Years Between, Virago (1994)
- Wicked!, Virago (1996)
- Like a Charm (Century) collaboration with other crime writers and edited by Karen Slaughter (2004)

Fiction

- My Dark Rosaleen Heinemann (1994)
- Unnatural Fire HarperCollins (2000)
- The Rival Queens HarperCollins (2001)
- The Ambitious Stepmother HarperCollins (2002)
- Fortune’s Slave HarperCollins (2004)
- The Murder Quadrille ebook (2011) ISBN 9780957074316

Short stories

- "The Actress & The Thief", BBC Radio 4, 1995
- "The Creep", Image Magazine (Eire), October 1995
- "Dead At The Wheel", Magazine of Architectural Symposium Pontresina, 2001
- "Down and Dirty", Like A Charm by Karin Slaughter (ed.) (Century, February 2004)
- Contributions to Encyclopedia of British Women's Writing 1900-1950 (Palgrave Macmillan), 2006

Plays

- Pamela with Giles Havergal 1985
- Hangover Square 1990
- Fragments From the Life of Marie Antoinette 1996
