= Eliza Haywood =

English novelist and painter (c. 1693 – 1756)

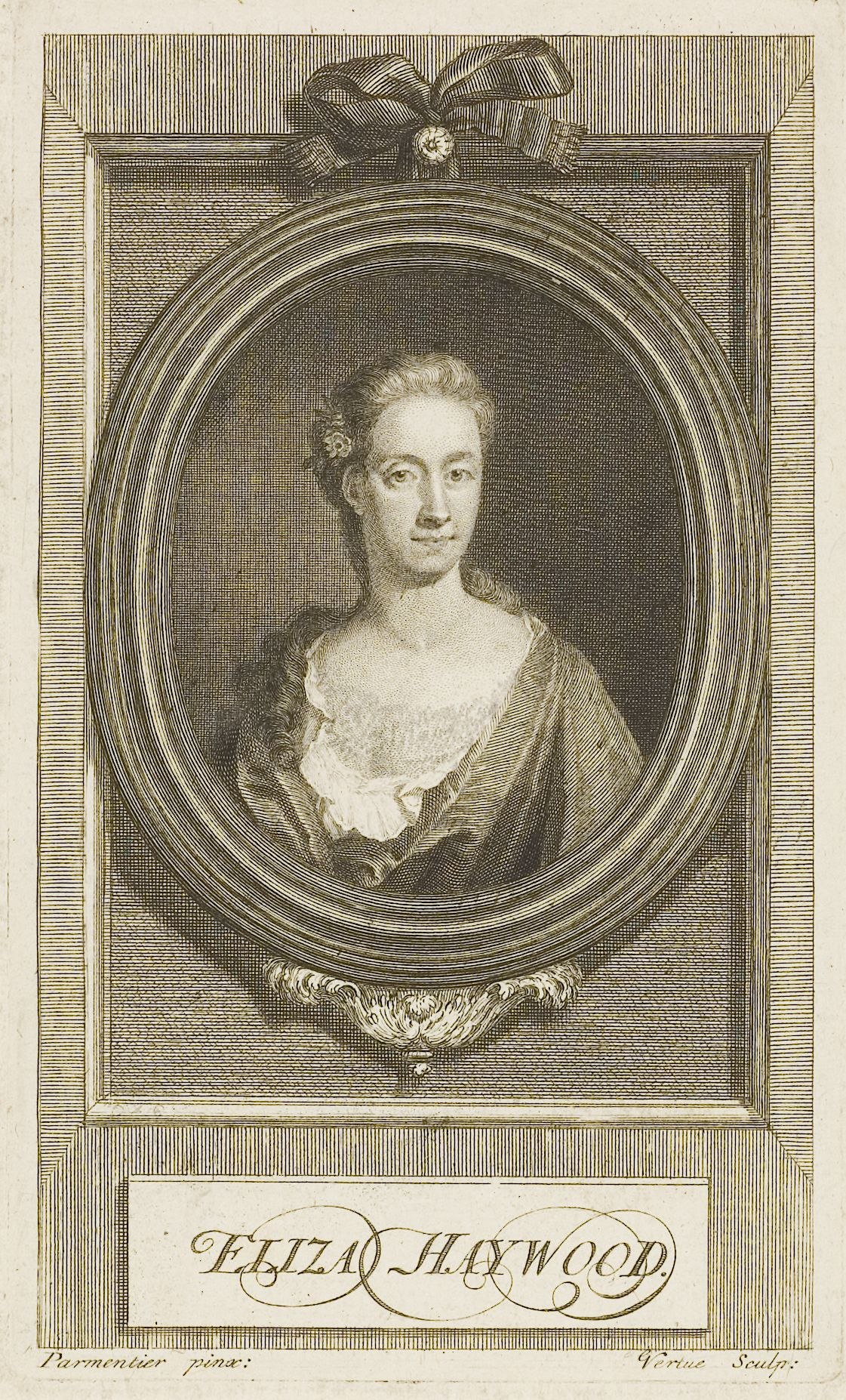
- Playwright and novelist Eliza Haywood, by George Vertue, 1725.
- Born: Elizabeth Fowler c. 1693; England
- Died: 25 February 1756 (aged c. 62–63)
- Resting place: Saint Margaret's Church near Westminster Abbey in Westminster

Eliza Haywood (née Elizabeth Fowler; c. 1693 – 25 February 1756) was an English writer, actress and publisher. Described as "prolific even by the standards of a prolific age", Haywood wrote and published over 70 works in her lifetime, including fiction, drama, translations, poetry, conduct literature and periodicals. Haywood today is studied primarily as one of the 18th-century founders of the novel in English. She is especially famous for her novel Love in Excess (1719–20).

== Biography ==
Scholars of Eliza Haywood universally agree upon only one thing: the exact date of her death. Haywood gave conflicting accounts of her own life; her origins remain unclear, and there are presently contending versions of her biography. For example, it was once mistakenly believed that she married the Rev. Valentine Haywood. According to report, Haywood took pains to keep her personal life private, asking the one (unnamed) person with knowledge of her private life to remain silent for fear that such facts may be misrepresented in print. Apparently, that person felt loyal enough to Haywood to honour her request.

The early life of Eliza Haywood is somewhat of a mystery to scholars. While Haywood was born "Elizabeth Fowler", the exact date of Haywood's birth is unknown due to the lack of surviving records. Although scholars believe that she was most likely born near Shropshire or London, England, in or around 1693, her birth date is extrapolated from a combination of her death date and her stated age at the time of her death (Haywood died on 25 February 1756 and obituaries notices list her age as sixty years).

Haywood's familial connections, education status, and social position are unknown. Some scholars have speculated that she is related to Sir Richard Fowler of Harnage Grange, who had a younger sister named Elizabeth. Others have stated that Haywood was most likely from London, England as several Elizabeths were born to Fowler families in 1693 in London; however, no evidence exists to positively confirm any of these possible connections. Her first entry in public records appears in Dublin, Ireland, in 1715. In this entry, she is listed as "Mrs. Haywood", performing in Thomas Shadwell's Shakespeare adaptation, Timon of Athens; or, The Man-Hater at the Smock Alley Theatre. Haywood described herself as a "widow", noting in 1719 that her marriage was "unfortunate", but no record of her marriage has been found and the identity of her husband remains unknown.

Scholars have speculated that Haywood had an affair and even a child with Richard Savage in the 1720s, in addition to a 20-year open relationship with William Hatchett, who was suspected of being the father of her second child. However, later critics have called these speculations into question as too heavily influenced by Alexander Pope's famous illustration of her in The Dunciad and too little based upon evidence. (Pope depicted Haywood as a grotesque figure with two "babes of love" at her waist, one by a poet and the other by a bookseller.) Other accounts from the period, however, suggest that her "friends" rejected Pope's scandalous depiction of her; they maintained that she had been deserted by her husband and left to raise their children alone. In fact, and despite the popular belief that she was once a woman of ill repute, Haywood seems to have had no particular scandals attached her name whatsoever.

Haywood's friendship with Richard Savage is thought to have begun around 1719. Savage wrote the gushing 'puff' for the anonymous Part I of her first novel, Love in Excess. The two appear to have been close in these early years, sharing many associates in literary and theatrical circles, even sharing the same publisher, William Chetwood. By September 1725, however, Savage and Haywood had fallen out, and he anonymously attacked her as a 'cast-off Dame' desperate for acclaim in The Authors of the Town. Savage is considered the likely impetus for Pope's attack on Haywood.

Haywood's association with Aaron Hill and the literary coterie known as The Hillarians seems to have followed a similar pattern as Haywood rose to fame. The Hillarians, a collection of writers and artists "committed to a progressive programme of ameliorating 'politeness'", included Savage, Hill, Martha Fowke, and for a time, Haywood. The group shared poems to and about each other, and formed a social circle of like minds. Haywood seems to have greatly admired Hill – who, though not a patron, seems to have promoted young, up-and-coming artists – and dedicated poems to him. She may have even seen him as a mentor during the earliest years of her career.

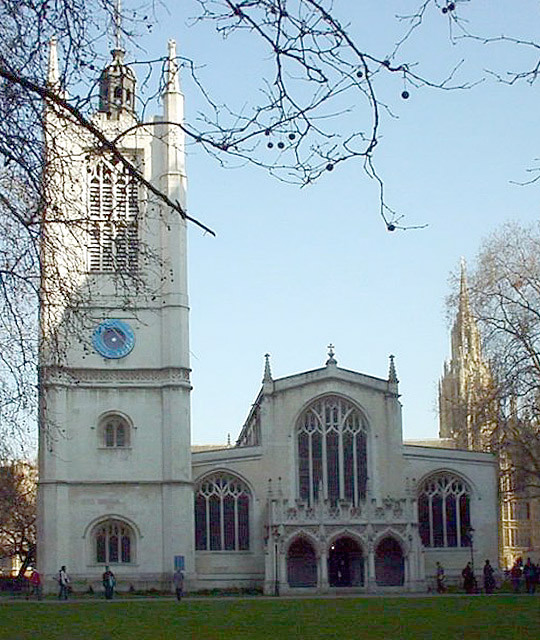
St. Margaret's Church, where Haywood was buried in an unmarked grave

William Hatchett was a long-time colleague and collaborator. The two probably met around 1728 or 1729, and recent critics have touted the pair as domestic partners or lovers, though this suggestion has now been challenged. He was a player, playwright, pamphleteer and translator (and perhaps "sponge") who shared a stage career with Haywood, and they collaborated on an adaptation of The Tragedy of Tragedies by Henry Fielding (with whom she also collaborated) and an opera, The Opera of Operas; or, Tom Thumb the Great (1733). They also may have collaborated on a translation of Claude Prosper Jolyot de Crébillon's Le Sopha in 1742. Hatchett has even been seen as the father of Haywood's second child (based on Pope's reference to "a Bookseller" as a father of one of her children, though Hatchett was not a bookseller.) No clear evidence supporting this or a domestic partnership is extant.

Haywood's long writing career began in 1719 with the first instalment of Love in Excess, a novel, and ended in the year she died with the conduct books The Wife and The Husband and contributions to the biweekly periodical The Young Lady. She wrote in almost every genre, often anonymously. Haywood is now considered "the foremost female 'author by profession' and businesswoman of the first half of the eighteenth century", tireless and prolific in her endeavours as an author, poet, playwright, periodical writer and editor, and publisher. During the early 1720s, "Mrs Haywood" dominated the novel market in London, so much so that contemporary Henry Fielding created a comic character, "Mrs. Novel", in The Author's Farce, modelled after her.

Haywood fell ill in October 1755 and died on 25 February 1756, actively publishing up to her death. She was buried in Saint Margaret's Church near Westminster Abbey in an unmarked grave in the churchyard. For unknown reasons, her burial was delayed by about a week.

== Acting and drama ==
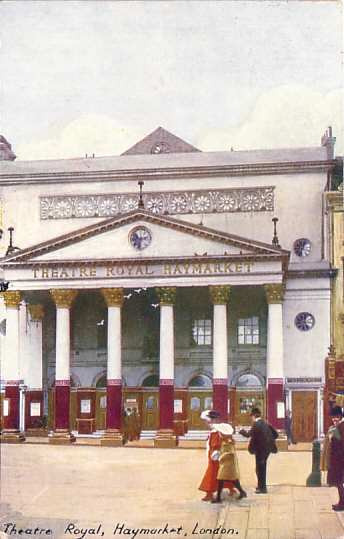
Haymarket Theatre, where Haywood acted, beginning in the late 1720s (image: ca. 1900)

Haywood began her acting career in 1715 at the Smock Alley Theatre in Dublin. Public records for this year list her as "Mrs. Haywood," appearing in Thomas Shadwell's Shakespeare adaptation, Timon of Athens; or, The Man-Hater.

By 1717, she had moved to Lincoln's Inn Fields, where she worked for John Rich. Rich had her rewrite a play called The Fair Captive. The play only ran for three nights (to the author's benefit), but Rich added a fourth night as a benefit for the second author, Haywood. In 1723, her first play, A Wife to be Lett, was staged.

In the later 1720s, Haywood continued acting, moving over to the Haymarket Theatre to join Henry Fielding in the opposition plays of the 1730s. In 1729, she wrote the tragedy Frederick, Duke of Brunswick-Lunenburgh to honour Frederick, Prince of Wales. George II's son was later a locus for Patriot Whig and Tory opposition to the ministry of Robert Walpole. As he made it clear that he did not favour his father's policies or ministry, praise for him was a demurral. However, when Haywood wrote the play, it is likely that she was still aiming to secure the patronage of the whole royal family, including Queen Caroline, as the royal split had yet to occur. Others, such as James Thomson and Henry Brooke, were also writing such "patriotic" plays (i. e. supportive of the Patriot Whigs) at the time, and Henry Carey would soon satirise the failed promise of George II.

Haywood's greatest Haymarket success came in 1733, with The Opera of Operas, an adaptation of Fielding's Tragedy of Tragedies with music by J. F. Lampe and Thomas Arne). However, it was an adaptation with a sharp difference. Caroline of Ansbach had affected a reconciliation between George I and George II, which meant an endorsement by George II of the Whig ministry. Haywood's adaptation contains a reconciliation scene, replete with symbols from Caroline's own grotto. This enunciated a change in Haywood herself, away from any Tory or anti-Walpolean causes she had supported previously. It did not go unnoticed by her contemporaries.

In 1735, Haywood wrote a Companion to the Theatre. The volume contains plot summaries of contemporary plays, literary criticism, and dramaturgical observations. In 1747 she added a second volume.

After the Licensing Act 1737, the playhouse was shut against adventurous new plays such as hers.

== Fiction ==
Haywood, Delarivier Manley and Aphra Behn were seen as "the fair triumvirate of wit" and major writers of amatory fiction. Haywood's prolific works moved from titillating romance novels to the amatory during the early 1720s to works, focusing more on "women's rights and position" (Schofield, Haywood 63) in the later 1720s into the 1730s. In the middle novels of her career, women would be locked up, tormented and beleaguered by domineering men, but in the later ones of the 1740s and 1750s marriage became a positive move for men and for women.

Due to the system for paying authors in 18th-century publishing, Haywood's novels often ran to multiple volumes. Authors would be paid only once for a book and receive no royalties: a second volume meant a second payment.

Title page of Love in Excess, 1720

Haywood's first novel, Love in Excess; Or, The Fatal Enquiry (1719–1720) touches on education and marriage. Often classified as a work of amatory fiction, this novel is notable for its treatment of the fallen woman. D'Elmonte, the novel's male protagonist, reassures one woman that she should not condemn herself: "There are times, madam", he says "in which the wisest have not power over their own actions." The fallen woman is given an unusually positive portrait.

Idalia; or The Unfortunate Mistress (1723) divides into three parts. In the first, Idalia appears as a young motherless, spoiled, yet wonderful Venetian aristocrat, whose varied amorous adventures carry her over most of Italy. Already in Venice she is sought by countless suitors, among them the base Florez, whom her father forbids the house. One suitor, Florez's friend Don Ferdinand, resigns his suit, but Idalia's vanity is piqued at the loss of an even a single adorer, and more from perverseness than from love continues to correspond with him. They meet, and he eventually effects her ruin. His beloved friend Henriquez conducts her to Padua, but also falls for her charms. He quarrels with Ferdinand and they eventually kill each other in a duel.

In the second part, Henriquez' brother, Myrtano, succeeds as Idalia's principal adorer, and she reciprocates. She then receives a letter informing her of Myrtano's engagement to another woman, and so she leaves for Verona, hoping to enter a convent. On the road her guide takes her to a rural retreat with the intention of killing her, but she escapes to Ancona, from where she takes ship for Naples. The sea captain pays crude court to her, but just in time to save her from his embraces, the ship is captured by corsairs commanded by a young married couple. Though the heroine is in peasant dress, she is treated with distinction by her captors. Her history moves them to tears and they in turn are in the midst of relating to Idalia an involved story of their courtship when the vessel is wrecked in a gale.

In the third part, Idalia is washed ashore on a plank. Succoured by cottagers, she continues her journey towards Rome in a man's clothing. On the way, robbers beat her and leave her for dead. She is found and taken home by a lady, Antonia, who falls in love with her. Idalia later discovers that Antonia's husband is her dear Myrtano. Their happiness is marred by the jealousy of his wife, who first tries to poison everyone and then appeals to the Pope to separate them. Idalia is taken to Rome first to a convent, where she leads a miserable life, persecuted by all the young gallants of the city. Then one day she sees Florez, the first cause of her misfortunes. With thoughts of revenge, she sends him a billet, but Myrtano keeps the appointment instead of Florez. Not recognising her lover, muffled in a cloak, Idalia stabs him, but upon recognising him is overcome by remorse, and dies by the same knife.

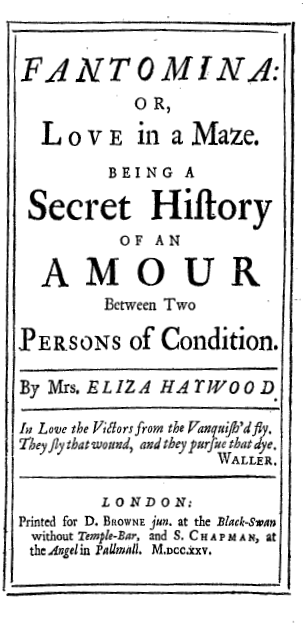
Title page of Fantomina, 1725

Fantomina; or Love in a Maze (1724) is a novella about a woman who assumes the roles of prostitute, handmaid, widow and lady, to seduce repeatedly a man named Beauplaisir. Schofield points out: "Not only does she satisfy her own sexual inclinations, she smugly believes that 'while he thinks to fool me, [he] is himself the only beguiled Person'" (p. 50). The story asserts that women have some access to social force – a recurring theme in Haywood's work. It has been argued that it owes a debt to the interpolated tale of an "Invisible Mistress" in Paul Scarron's Roman Comique.

The Mercenary Lover; or, The Unfortunate Heiresses (1726) examines the risks women face in giving way to passion. Miranda, the eldest of two heiress sisters, marries Clitander, the mercenary lover of the title. Unsatisfied with Miranda's half of the estate, Clitander seduces Althea, the younger sister, by plying her with romantic books and notions. She gives way to "ungovernable passion" and becomes pregnant. Clitander fools her into signing over her inheritance, then poisons her, killing both her and the unborn child.

The Distress'd Orphan; or Love in a Madhouse (1726) is a novella that relates the plight of a woman falsely imprisoned in a private madhouse. In Patrick Spedding's A Bibliography of Eliza Haywood, he notes that The Distress'd Orphan; or Love in a Madhouse was more "enduringly popular", "reprinted more often, in larger editions, and remained in print for a longer period, than... Love in Excess" (p. 21). It recounts the story of Annilia, who is an orphan and heiress. Her uncle and guardian Giraldo plan to gain access to her fortune by having her marry his son, Horatio. When Annilia meets Colonel Marathon at a dance and they fall in love, she rejects her uncle's plan and prepares to move out of his home. In response, Giraldo declares her insane and has her confined in a private madhouse, so gaining control over her inheritance. Annilia languishes in the madhouse until Marathon enters it as a supposed patient and rescues her.

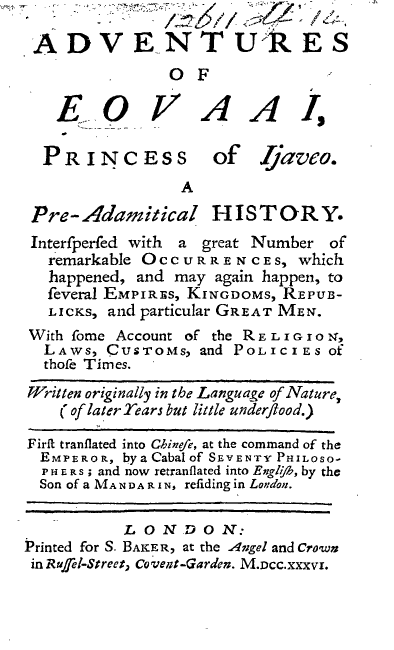
Title page of Adventures of Eovaai, 1736

The Adventures of Eovaii: A Pre-Adamitical History (1736), also entitled The Unfortunate Princess (1741), is a satire of Prime Minister Robert Walpole, told through a sort of oriental fairy tale. The Anti-Pamela; or, Feign'd Innocence Detected (1741) is a satirical response to Samuel Richardson's didactic novel Pamela, or, Virtue Rewarded (1740), making fun of the idea of bargaining one's maidenhead for a place in society. (Their contemporary Henry Fielding also reacted to Pamela in 1741 with An Apology for the Life of Mrs. Shamela Andrews.) The Fortunate Foundlings (1744) is a picaresque novel, in which two children of opposite sex experience the world differently, in line with their gender.

The History of Miss Betsy Thoughtless (1751) is a sophisticated, multi-plot novel that has been deemed the first in English to explore female development in English. Betsy leaves her emotionally and financially abusive husband Munden and experiences independence for a time before she decides to marry again. Written a few years before her marriage-conduct books were published, the novel contains advice in the form of quips from Lady Trusty. Her "patriarchal conduct-book advice to Betsy is often read literally as Haywood's new advice for her female audience. However, Haywood's audience consisted of both men and women, and Lady Trusty's bridal admonitions, the most conservative and patriarchal words of advice in the novel, are contradictory and impossible for any woman to execute completely."

Betsy Thoughtless marks a strong change in 18th-century fiction. It portrays a mistaken, but intelligent and strong-willed woman, who gives way to society's pressures to marry. According to Backsheider, Betsy Thoughtless as a novel of marriage, rather than the more popular subject of courtship, foreshadows a type of domestic novel that will culminate in the 19th century, for example in Charlotte Brontë's Jane Eyre. Instead of concerning itself with attracting a worthy partner, Betsy Thoughtless examines marrying well; its heroine learns that to give way to the role of women in marriage can be fulfilling.

The fullest and most detailed bibliography of Haywood is by Patrick Spedding.

== Periodicals and non-fiction ==
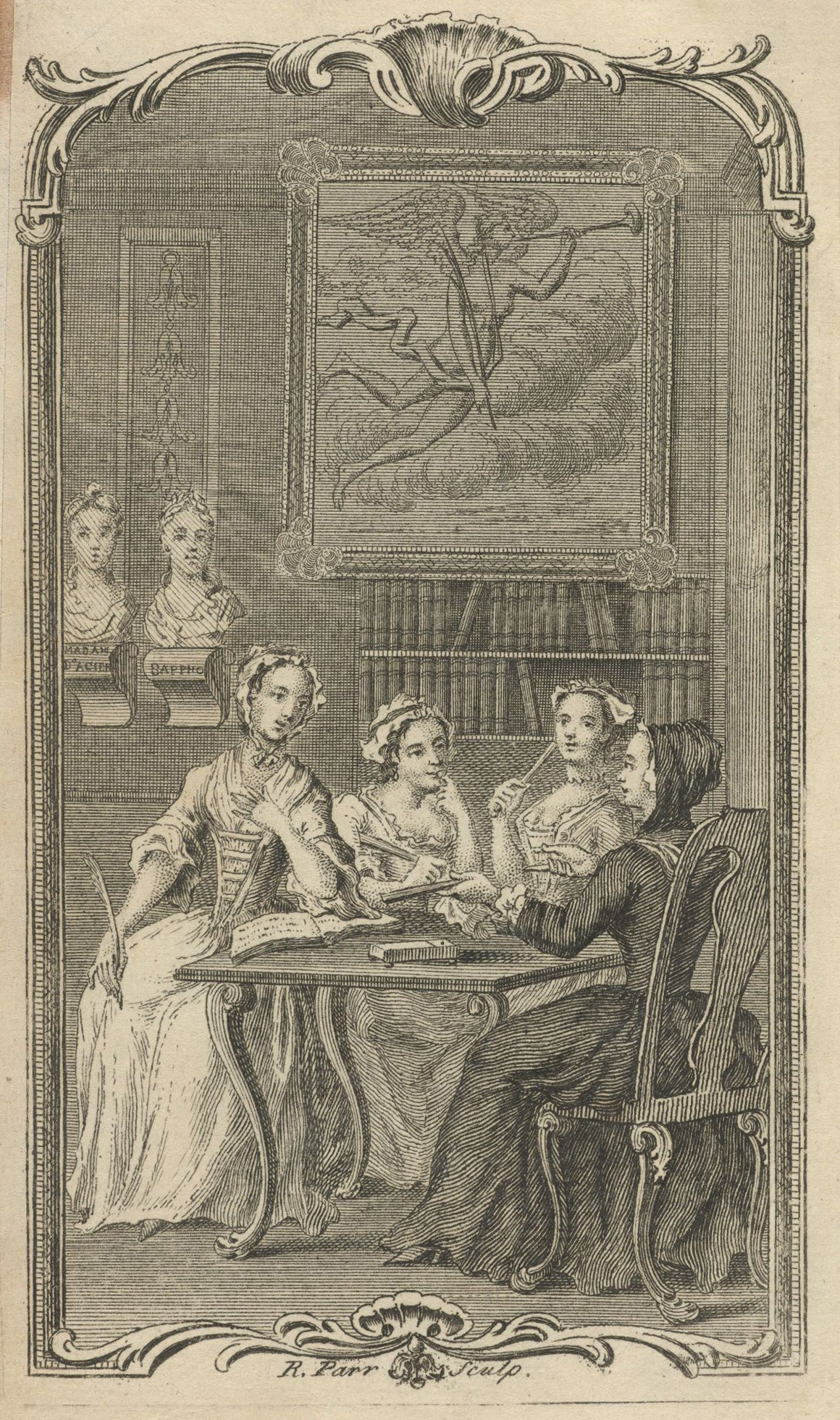
Frontispiece to The Female Spectator, Vol. 1

While writing popular novels, Eliza Haywood also worked on periodicals, essays and manuals on social behaviour (conduct books). The Female Spectator (24 numbers, 1745–1746), a monthly, was written in response to the contemporary The Spectator by Joseph Addison and Richard Steele. In The Female Spectator, Haywood wrote in four personae (Mira, Euphrosine, Widow of Quality and The Female Spectator) and took positions on issues such as marriage, children, reading, education and conduct. It was the first periodical written for women by a woman and arguably one of her most significant contributions to women's writing. Haywood followed a lead by contemporary John Dunton who issued the Ladies' Mercury as a companion to his successful Athenian Mercury. Though The Ladies' Mercury was a self-proclaimed women's journal, it was produced by men (Spacks, p. xii).

The Parrot (1746) apparently earned her questions from the government for political statements about Charles Edward Stuart. Mary Stuart, Queen of Scots (1725) is termed a "hybrid" by Schofield (p. 103), as a work of non-fiction that makes use of narrative techniques. Reflections on the Various Effects of Love (1726) is a didactic account of what can happen to a woman when she gives in to her passions. This piece displays the sexual double standard that allows men to love freely without social consequence and women to be called scandalous for doing the same. The Wife and The Husband (1756) are conduct books for each partner in a marriage. The Wife was first published anonymously (by Mira, one of Haywood's personas from The Female Spectator); The Husband: in Answer to The Wife followed later the same year with Haywood's name attached.

Haywood also worked on sensational pamphlets on the contemporary deaf-mute prophet, Duncan Campbell. They include A Spy Upon the Conjurer (1724) and The Dumb Projector: Being a Surprising Account of a Trip to Holland Made by Duncan Campbell (1725).

== Political writings ==
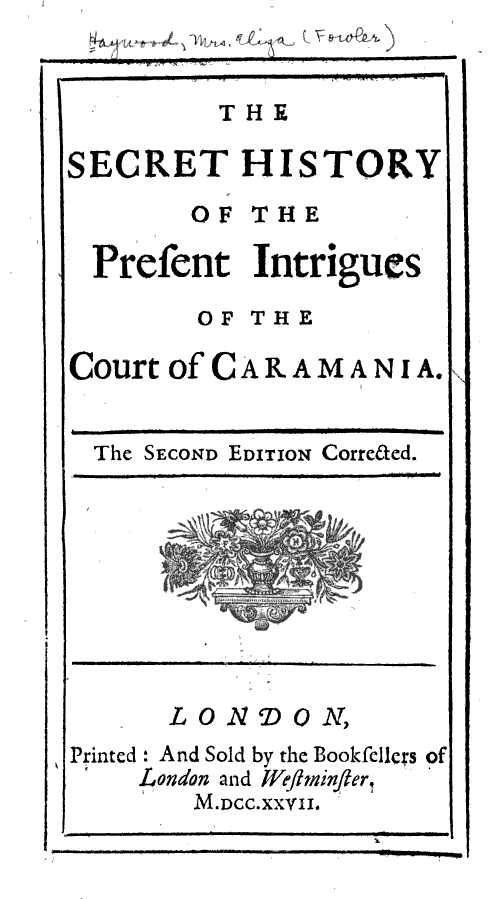
Title page of The Secret History of the Present Intrigues of the Court of Caramania, 1727.

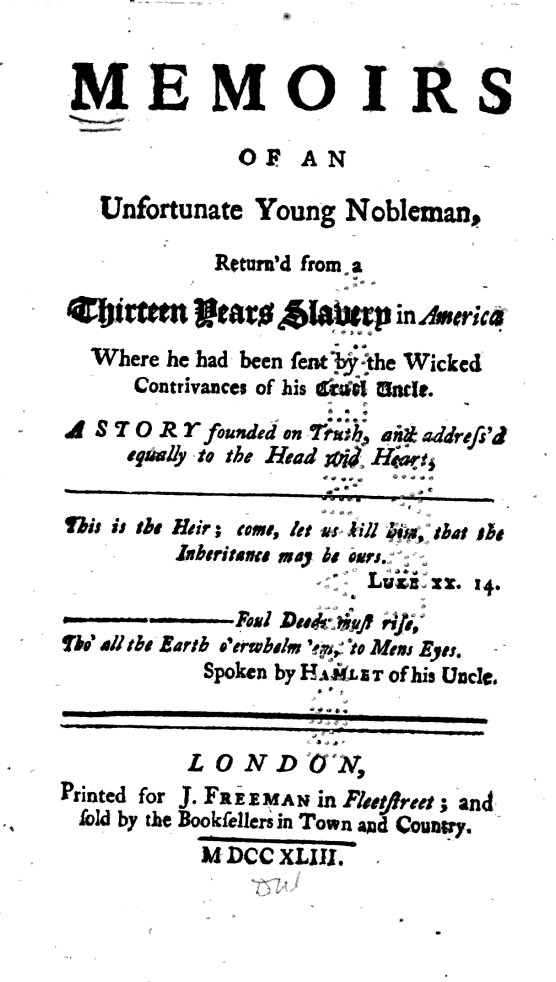
Title page of Memoirs of an Unfortunate Young Nobleman, 1743.

Eliza Haywood was active in politics throughout her career, although she changed parties around the time George II was reconciled to Robert Walpole. She wrote a series of parallel histories, beginning with the Memoirs of a Certain Island, Adjacent to Utopia (1724), and then The Secret History of the Present Intrigues of the Court of Caramania (1727). Her Memoirs of an Unfortunate Young Nobleman (1743) fictionalised the life of James Annesley.

In 1746 she started another journal, The Parrot, for which she was questioned by the government on political statements about Charles Edward Stuart, just after the Jacobite rising of 1745. This happened again with A Letter from H---- G----g, Esq. (1750). She grew more directly political in The Invisible Spy (1755) and The Wife (1756).

== Translations ==
Haywood published eight translations of popular continental romances: Letters from a Lady of Quality (1721, translating Edme Boursault's play), The Lady's Philosopher's Stone (1723, translating Louis Adrien Duperron de Castera's historical novel), La Belle Assemblée (1724–1734, translating Madame de Gomez's novella), Love in its Variety (1727, translating Matteo Bandello's stories), The Disguis'd Prince (1728, translating Madame de Villedieu's 1679 novel), The Virtuous Villager (1742, translating Charles de Fieux's work), and with William Hatchett, The Sopha (1743, translating Prosper Jolyot de Crébillon's novel).

== Critical reception ==
Haywood is notable as a transgressive, outspoken writer of amatory fiction, plays, romance and novels. Paula R. Backscheider claims, "Haywood's place in literary history is equally remarkable and as neglected, misunderstood, and misrepresented as her œuvre" (p. xiii intro drama).

For a time Eliza Haywood was more frequently noted for appearing in Alexander Pope's The Dunciad rather than on her literary merits. Though Alexander Pope centred her in the heroic games of The Dunciad in Book II, she was in his view "vacuous". He does not dismiss her as a woman, but as having nothing of her own to say – for her politics and implicitly for plagiarism. Unlike other "dunces", Pope's verdict does not seem to have caused her subsequent obscurity. Rather it was as literary historians came to praise and value the masculine novel and most importantly dismiss the courtship novel and novels of eroticism that she was upstaged by more chaste or overtly philosophical works. In The Dunciad, booksellers race to reach Eliza, their reward to be all of her books and her company. In Pope's view, she is for sale, in other words, in literature and society. As with other "dunces", she was not without complicity in the attack. Haywood had begun to make it known that she was poor and in need of funds; she seemed to be writing for pay and to please an undiscerning public.

In the conclusion to Old Mortality (1816), one of Walter Scott's comic characters references Haywood's Jemmy and Jenny Jessamy (1753) as a model of pathos. Editors suggest the novel had become something of a joke in literary circles by the late 18th century.

Eliza Haywood is seen as "a case study in the politics of literary history" (Backscheider, p. 100). She is also being re-evaluated by feminist scholars and rated highly. Interest has burgeoned since the 1980s. Her novels are seen as stylistically innovative. Her plays and political writing attracted most attention in her own time, and she was a full player in that difficult public sphere. Her novels, voluminous and frequent, are now seen as stylistically innovative and important transitions from the erotic seduction novels and poetry of Aphra Behn, particularly Love-Letters Between a Nobleman and His Sister (1684), and the straightforward, plain-spoken novels of Frances Burney. In her own day, her plays and political writing attracted the most comment and attention – she was a full player in the difficult public sphere – but today her novels carry the most interest and demonstrate the most significant innovation.

== As a publisher ==
Works published under her imprint: Haywood not only wrote works to be published, but participated in the publication process. Sometimes in collaboration with William Hatchett, at least nine works under her own imprint. Most were available for sale at the Sign of Fame (her pamphlet shop in Covent Gardens), including:

- Anti-Pamela by Eliza Haywood (1741)
- Sublime Character of his Excellency Somebody by Unknown (1741)
  - Title page states that the work was "Originally Written by a Celebrated French Wit"
- The Busy-Body: or, Successful Spy by Susannah Centlivre (1742)
- The Ghost of Eustace Budgel Esq. to the Man in Blue possibly by William Hatchett (1742)
- The Right Honourable, sir Robert Walpole, (Now Earl of Orford) Vindicated by "A Brother Minister in Disgrace" (1742)
- The Virtuous Villager by Eliza Haywood (1742)
- A Remarkable Cause on a Note of Hand by William Hatchett (1742)
- The Equity of Parnassus by Unknown (1744)
- A Letter from H[enry] G[orin]g by Eliza Haywood (1749)

King notes that the 18th-century definition of "publisher" could also cover bookselling. King is uncertain whether Haywood produced the books and pamphlets that she sold (as Spedding indicates) or whether she was a bookseller, especially for her own early productions. Haywood sometimes collaborated on publishing so as to share the costs, as she did with Cogan on The Virtuous Villager. In any case, Haywood was certainly a bookseller, for many and various works "to be had" at the Sign of Fame did not bear her imprint.

== Works by Haywood ==
Collections by Eliza Haywood published before 1850:

- The Danger of Giving Way to Passion (1720–1723)
- The Works (3 volumes, 1724)
- Secret Histories, Novels and Poems (4 volumes, 1725)
- Secret Histories, Novels, Etc. (1727)

Individual works by Eliza Haywood published before 1850:

- Love in Excess (1719–1720)
- Letters from a Lady of Quality to a Chevalier (1720) (translation of Edme Boursault's novel)
- The Fair Captive (1721)
- The British Recluse (1722)
- The Injur'd Husband (1722)
- Idalia; or The Unfortunate Mistress (1723)
- A Wife to be Lett (1723)
- Lasselia; or The Self-Abandon'd (1723)
- The Rash Resolve; or, The Untimely Discovery (1723)
- Poems on Several Occasions (1724)
- A Spy Upon the Conjurer (1724)
- The Lady's Philosopher's Stone (1725) (translation of Louis Adrien Duperron de Castera's historical novel)
- The Masqueraders; or Fatal Curiosity (1724)
- The Fatal Secret; or, Constancy in Distress (1724)
- The Surprise (1724)
- The Arragonian Queen: A Secret History (1724)
- The Force of Nature; or, The Lucky Disappointment (1724)
- Memoirs of the Baron de Brosse (1724)
- La Belle Assemblée (1724–1734) (translation of Madame de Gomez's novella)
- Fantomina; or Love in a Maze (1725)
- Memoirs of a Certain Island Adjacent to the Kingdom of Utopia (1725)
- Bath Intrigues: in four Letters to a Friend in London (1725)
- The Unequal Conflict (1725)
- The Tea-Table (1725)
- The Dumb Projector: Being a Surprising Account of a Trip to Holland Made by Duncan Campbell (1725)
- The Fatal Fondness (1725)
- Mary Stuart, Queen of Scots (1725)
- The Mercenary Lover; or, the Unfortunate Heiresses (1726)
- Reflections on the Various Effects of Love (1726)
- The Distressed Orphan; or, Love in a Madhouse (1726)
- The City Jilt; or, The Alderman Turn'd Beau (1726)
- The Double Marriage; or, The Fatal Release (1726)
- The Secret History of the Present Intrigues of the Court of Carimania (1726)
- Letters from the Palace of Fame (1727)
- Cleomelia; or The Generous Mistress (1727)
- The Fruitless Enquiry (1727)
- The Life of Madam de Villesache (1727)
- Love in its Variety (1727) (translation of Matteo Bandello's stories)
- Philadore and Placentia (1727)
- The Perplex'd Dutchess; or Treachery Rewarded (1728)
- The Agreeable Caledonian; or, Memoirs of Signiora di Morella (1728)
- Irish Artifice; or, The History of Clarina (1728)
- The Disguis'd Prince (1728) (translation of Madame de Villedieu's 1679 novel)
- The City Widow (1728)
- Persecuted Virtue; or, The Cruel Lover (1728)
- The Fair Hebrew; or, A True, but Secret History of Two Jewish Ladies (1729)
- Frederick, Duke of Brunswick-Lunenburgh (1729)
- Love-Letters on All Occasions Lately Passed between Persons of Distinction (1730)
- The Opera of Operas (1733)
- L'Entretien des Beaux Esprits (1734) (translation of Madame de Gomez's novella)
- The Dramatic Historiographer (1735)
- Arden of Feversham (1736)
- Adventures of Eovaai, Princess of Ijaveo: A Pre-Adamitical History (1736)
  - Alternative title The Unfortunate Princess, or The Ambitious Statesman (2nd edition, 1741)
- The Anti-Pamela; or, Feign'd Innocence Detected (1741)
- The Virtuous Villager (1742) (translation of Charles de Fieux's work)
- The Sopha (1743) (translation of Claude Prosper Jolyot de Crébillon's novel)
- Memoirs of an Unfortunate Young Nobleman (1743)
- A Present for a Servant Maid; or, the Sure Means of Gaining Love and Esteem (1743)
- The Fortunate Foundlings (1744)
- The Female Spectator (4 volumes, 1744–1746)
- The Parrot (1746)
- Memoirs of a Man of Honour (1747)
- Life's Progress through the Passions; or, The Adventures of Natura (1748)
- Epistle for the Ladies (1749)
- Dalinda; or The Double Marriage (1749)
- A Letter from H---- G-----, Esq., One of the Gentlemen of the Bedchamber of the Young Chevalier (1750)
- The History of Miss Betsy Thoughtless (1751)
- The History of Jemmy and Jenny Jessamy (1753)
- The Invisible Spy (1754)
- The Wife (1756)
- The Young Lady (1756)
- The Husband (1756)
- See also: The Female Spectator (4 vols., 1744–1746). 5th ed., v.3 (London: 1755); 7th ed. (London: 1771)

== See also ==
- List of early-modern British women playwrights
- List of early-modern British women poets
