= Delarivier Manley =

English writer

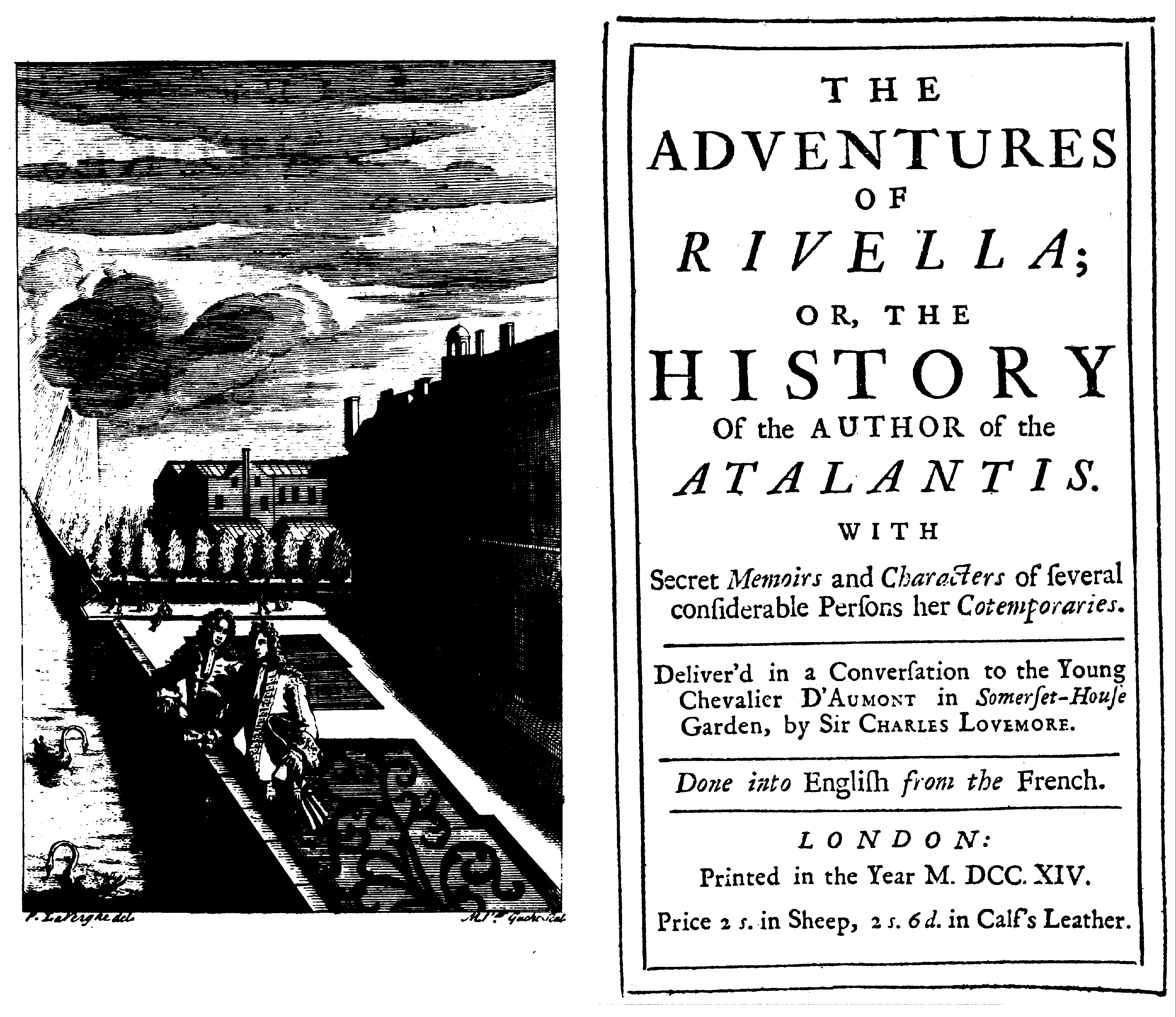
Present in all that's said about her: Manley's half-fictional autobiography

Delarivier "Delia" Manley (1663 or c. 1670 – 24 July 1724) was an English author, playwright, and political pamphleteer. Manley is sometimes referred to, with Aphra Behn and Eliza Haywood, as one of "the fair triumvirate of wit", which is a later attribution.

Some outdated sources list her first name as Mary, but recent scholarship has demonstrated that to be an error: Mary was the name of one of her sisters, and she always referred to herself as Delarivier or Delia.

== Early life and theatrical writings ==
Much of what is known about Manley is rooted in her insertion of "Delia's story" in The New Atalantis (1709) and the Adventures of Rivella that she published as the biography of the author of the Atalantis with Edmund Curll in 1714. Curll added further details on the publication history behind the Rivella in the first posthumous edition of the quasi-fictional and not entirely-reliable autobiography in 1725.

Manley was probably born in Jersey, the third of six children of Sir Roger Manley, a royalist army officer and historian, and a woman from the Spanish Netherlands, who died when Delarivier was young. It seems that she and her sister, Cornelia, moved with their father to his various army postings.

After their father's death in 1687, the young women became wards of their cousin, John Manley (1654–1713), a Tory MP. John Manley had married a Cornish heiress and, later, bigamously, married Delarivier. They had a son in 1691, also named John. In January 1694 Manley left her husband and went to live with Barbara Villiers, the 1st Duchess of Cleveland, at one time the mistress of Charles II. She remained there only six months, at which time she was expelled by the duchess for allegedly flirting with her son. There is some indication that she may have been by then reconciled with her husband, for a time.

From 1694 to 1696, Manley travelled extensively in England, principally in the southwest, and began her dramatic career. At this time she wrote her first play, a comedy, The Lost Lover, or, The Jealous Husband (1696), and the she-tragedy The Royal Mischief (1696), which became the subject of ridicule and inspired the anonymous satirical play The Female Wits. The satire mocked three female playwrights, including Manley, Catharine Trotter, and Mary Pix. Manley retired from the stage for ten years before returning with her 1707 play, Almyna, or, The Arabian Vow. Ten years later, Manley's Lucius, The First King of Britain, was staged.

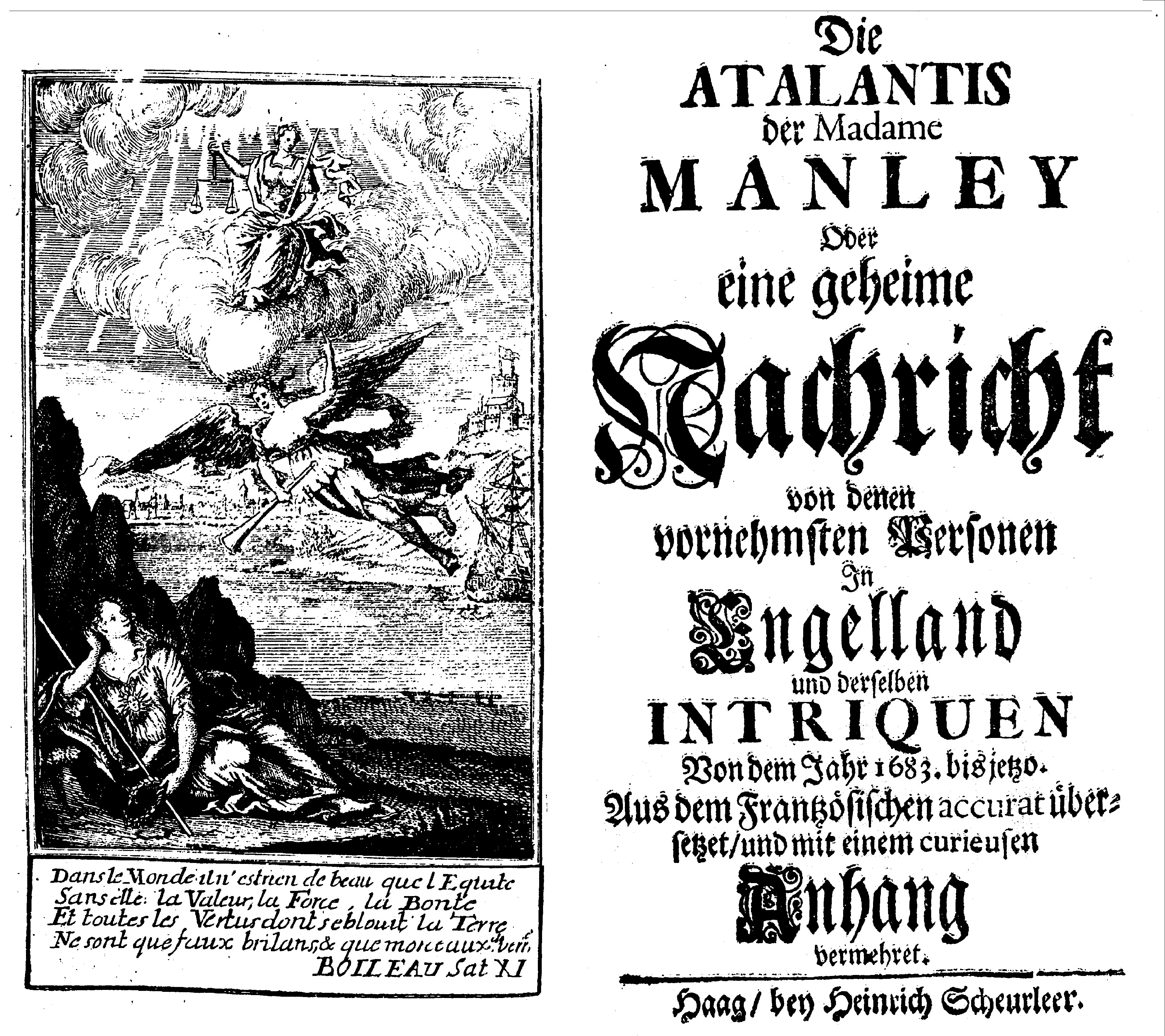
German edition of Manley's Atalantis, 1713

== Political satire ==
Manley became well-known, even notorious, as a novelist with the publication of her roman à clef the New Atalantis in 1709, a work that spotted present British politics on the fabulous Mediterranean Island. Contemporary critics like Swift might consider that her caricatures missed the mark much more often than they hit it; but a historian like G. M. Trevelyan would at least rate her portrait of Godolphin as a telling one: "...the greatest genius of his age with the least of it in his aspect. The affairs of a nation in his head, with a pair of cards or a box of dice in his hand".

Such was the scandal the work produced that Manley was arrested, and immediately questioned by the authorities in preparation of a libel case against her. She had discredited half the arena of ruling Whig politicians, as well as moderate Tories like John Churchill, 1st Duke of Marlborough, who, she said, had begun his career at court in the bed of the royal mistress, Barbara Villiers. Manley resolutely denied all correspondencies between her characters and real people, and the charges were eventually dropped: part of the difficulty of those offended was proving that she had actually told their stories, without exposing themselves to further ridicule. Manley's semi-autobiographical Adventures of Rivella repeated the claim that her work was entirely fictional.

The result was a tacit agreement as to the fictional status of her works, under cover of which she continued to publish another volume of the Atalantis and two more of the Memoirs of Europe. The latter found a different fictional setting to allow the wider European picture. Later editions sold the Memoirs, however, as volumes three and four of the Atalantis, which also came to incorporate the earlier skit, the Secret History of Queen Zarah; while the Atalantis also sparked several imitations by others.

Meanwhile, with the Tory electoral victory of 1710, Manley came to collaborate with Swift in a number of pro-Tory pamphlets, and also took over the editorship of The Examiner from him. Her satirical attacks on the Whigs resulted in a payment from the new Prime Minister Robert Harley, 1st Earl of Oxford and Mortimer; but with the accession of George I and the ensuing Tory collapse, her position disintegrated, as a begging letter to Harley reveals: "I have nothing but a starveling scene before me, Lord Marlborough and all his accomplices justly enraged against me. Nothing saved from the wreck".

== Later writings ==
Manley, however, was a resilient figure. In 1714, she had been threatened with being the object of a biographical text planned by Charles Gildon, but Curll, Gildon's prospective publisher warned Manley of the work in progress. She contacted Gildon and arranged for an agreement: she would write the work in question herself within a certain time span. The result were her Adventures of Rivella, a book evolving between two male protagonists: the young chevalier D'Aumont has left France to have sex with the author and finds a rejected lover and friend who does not only offer his assistance in arranging the contact but also tells the story of her life, both as related in public gossip and as only her friends know it. In this work, Manley has been seen as repositioning herself politically as a more moderate figure, in preparation for the power shifts to come; and it may be significant that it was a Whig, Richard Steele, who was later to produce her lucrative drama Lucius in 1717.

Her last major work, The Power of Love in Seven Novels (London: J. Barber/ J. Morphew, 1720), was a revised version of selected novellas first published in William Painter's Palace of Pleasure well furnished with pleasaunt Histories and excellent Novelles (1566). In Manley's The Power of Love novellas, her female characters often participated in violent acts of revenge against the men who betrayed them. While betrayal by men was common in her earlier works, scenes of violent revenge enacted upon them by women was new to her later works.

== Death ==
Manley died at Barber's Printing House, on Lambeth Hill, after a violent fit of the cholic which lasted five days. Her body was interred in the middle aisle of the Church of St Benet at Paul's-Wharf, where on a marble gravestone is the following inscription to her memory:

"Here lieth the body of
Mrs. Delarivier Manley,
Daughter of Sir Roger Manley, Knight,
Who, suitable to her birth and education,
Was acquainted with several Parts of Knowledge,
And with the most polite Writers, both in the French and English tongue.
This Accomplishment,
Together with a greater Natural Stock of Wit, made her Conversation agreeable to
All who knew Her, and her Writings to be universally Read with Pleasure.
She died July 11th, 1724."

== Reception ==
She lived on the fame of her notorious personality as early as 1714. Her precarious marriage past, numerous quarrels, her obesity and her politics were topics that she sold in constant revisions of the fame she had acquired. That was apparently no problem before the 1740s, as Manley was translated into French and German in the early 18th century, and received new English editions during the first half of the century. Alexander Pope satirised the eternal fame that she was about to acquire in his Rape of the Lock in 1712—it would last "as long as the Atalantis shall be read."

Manley was recognised for her dramatic contributions to the stage from the late 1690s to the late 1710s. Her tragedy, The Royal Mischief, was criticised for its resemblance to 1670s heroic tragedy. Almyna, her dramatic adaptation of The Arabian Nights Entertainments also found itself entangled in controversy by Anne Bracegirdle's retirement from the stage and the high cost of the production.

Manley was also an avid supporter and defender of the first fully-fledged it-narrative in English, Charles Gildon's The Golden Spy (1709).

The revision of her fame and status as an author began in the early decades of the 18th century and led to manifest defamations in the 19th and early 20th centuries: she became seen as a scandalous female author who, some critics audaciously asserted, did not deserve to be ever read again. Later critics, however, looked back on the conclusions of Richetti and others as short-sighted and perhaps even outright misogynistic and more reflective of their era than of general historic scholarship on the author as an important political satirist.

Manley's present reappreciation began with Patricia Köster's edition of her works. The more accessible edition of The New Atalantis, which Rosalind Ballaster turned into a Penguin Classic, brought Manley wider recognition among students of early 18th-century literature. Janet Todd, Catherine Gallagher and Ros Ballaster provided the perspective of Manley as a proto-feminist. Fidelis Morgan's, A Woman of No Character. An Autobiography of Mrs. Manley (London, 1986) put the (auto-)biographical information into the first more coherent picture. More recent critics such as Rachel Carnell and Ruth Herman have professionalised her biography and provided standardised scholarly editions.

Manley has been erroneously claimed to have written The Secret History of Queen Zarah (1705). That was first doubted in Köster's edition of her works, which still included the title. The claim was openly rejected by Olaf Simons (2001) who reread the wider context of early 18th century Atalantic novels.

J. Alan Downie (2004) went a step further and cast light on the presumable author of the Queen Zarah: Dr Joseph Browne.

== Bibliography ==
- Letters written by Mrs Manley (1696)
  - posthumously republished as A Stage-Coach Journey to Exeter. Describing the Humours on the Road, with the Characters and Adventures of the Company (1725)
- The Lost Lover; or The Jealous Husband: A Comedy (1696)
- The Royal Mischief (1696), a tragedy
- Almyna, or the Arabian Vow (1707), a tragedy
- The Secret History of Queen Zarah and the Zarahians. Containing the true reasons of the necessity of the revolution that lately happen’d in the Kingdom of Albigion (1705)
- Secret Memoirs and Manners of Several Persons of Quality of Both Sexes, from the new Atlantis, an island in the Mediterranean (1709), a satire in which great liberties were taken with Whig notables
- Memoirs of Europe towards the Close of the Eighth Century. Written by Eginardus (1710)
- The Adventures of Rivella; or, The History of the Author of the (New) Atalantis (1714)
- Lucius, The First Christian King of Britain (1717), a tragedy
- Delarivier Manley revising William Painter: The Power of Love in Seven Novels (London: J. Barber/ J. Morphew, 1720).

She also edited Jonathan Swift's Examiner. In her writings she played with classical names and spelling. She was an uninhibited and effective political writer.

== See also ==
- Abigail Masham, Baroness Masham
- Bluestocking
- Dystopia
- Lady Mary Wortley Montagu
- Mademoiselle de Scudéry
- Menippean satire

== Sources ==
- Ros Ballaster, ‘Manley, Delarivier (c.1670–1724)’, Oxford Dictionary of National Biography, Oxford University Press, 2004.
- Carole Sargent, "Military Scandal and National Debt in Manley's 'New Atalantis'", SEL: Studies in English Literature 1500–1900, 53:3, Summer 2013.
- Carole Fungaroli Sargent, , "How a Pie Fight Satirizes Whig-Tory Conflict in Delarivier Manley's 'The New Atalantis'", Eighteenth-Century Studies, 44:4, Summer 2011.
- Aaron Santesso, "'The New Atalantis' and Varronian Satire," Philological Quarterly, Spring 2000.
- Rachel Carnell, A Political Biography of Delarivier Manley (London: Pickering & Chatto, 2008).
- Ruth Herman, The Business of a Woman: The Political Writings of Delarivier Manley (London: AUP, 2003).
- Rachel Carnell and Ruth Herman, The Selected Works of Delarivier Manley (London: Pickering and Chatto, 2005).
- Patricia Köster, "Delariviere Manley and the DNB. A Cautionary Tale about Following Black Sheep with a Challenge to Cataloguers", Eighteenth-Century Live, 3 (1977), p. 106-11.
- Fidelis Morgan, A Woman of No Character. An Autobiography of Mrs. Manley (London, 1986).
- Dale Spender, Mothers of the Novel: 100 Good Women Writers Before Jane Austen (1986).
- Janet Todd, "Life after Sex: The Fictional Autobiography of Delarivier Manley", Women's Studies: An Interdisciplinary Journal, 15 (1988), p. 43–55.
- Janet Todd (ed.), "Manley, Delarivier." British Women Writers: A Critical Reference Guide. London: Routledge, 1989. 436–440.
- Rosalind Ballaster, "Introduction" to: Manley, Delariviere, New Atalantis, ed. R. Ballaster (London, 1992), p.v-xxi.
- Ros Ballaster, 'Delarivier Manley (c. 1663–1724)' at www.chawton.org
- Catharine Gallagher, "Political Crimes and Fictional Alibis. The Case of Delarivier Manley", Eighteenth Century Studies, 23 (1990), p. 502-21.
- Olaf Simons, Marteaus Europa oder Der Roman, bevor er Literatur wurde (Amsterdam/ Atlanta: Rodopi, 2001), p. 173–179, 218–246.
- J. Alan Downie, "What if Delarivier Manley Did Not Write The Secret History of Queen Zarah?", The Library (2004) 5(3):247–264 .
- Paul Bunyan Anderson, "Mistress Delarivière Manley's Biography", Modern Philology, 33 (1936), p. 261-78.
- Paul Bunyan Anderson, "Delariviere Manley's Prose Fiction", Philological Quarterley, 13 (1934), p. 168-88.
- Gwendolyn Needham, "Mary de la Rivière Manley, Tory Defender", Huntington Library Quarterley, 12 (1948/49), p. 255-89.
- Gwendolyn Needham, "Mrs Manley. An Eighteenth-Century Wife of Bath", Huntington Library Quarterley, 14 (1950/51), p. 259-85.
