= Thomas Smith (actor) =

British actor

Thomas Smith (died 1766) was a British stage actor of the eighteenth century.

He first joined the Drury Lane company in the late seventeenth century. He spent time at the Queen's Theatre in Haymarket and in 1715 joined John Rich's company at Lincoln's Inn Fields. He remained with the company, although acting elsewhere such as Dublin's Smock Alley Theatre, until 1728. There another Smith, named Charles, at the company in his latter years and their roles are sometimes confused. After leaving Lincoln's Inn, Thomas Smith moved to the Haymarket Theatre and then to Goodman's Fields where he acted in Henry Giffard's company until 1733.

His daughter, was also an actress, making her debut at Lincoln's Inn Fields in 1716.

== Selected roles ==
- Cyaxeres in Cyrus the Great by John Banks (1695)
- Peter in Imposture Defeated by George Powell (1697)
- Brisson in The Unhappy Penitent by Catherine Trotter (1701)
- Phorbas in The Virgin Prophetess by Elkanah Settle (1701)
- Albazer in The Generous Conqueror by Bevil Higgons (1701)
- Ibrahim Bassa in Irene by Charles Goring (1708)
- High Priest in The Persian Princess by Lewis Theobald (1708)
- Numitorius in Appius and Virginia by John Dennis (1709)
- Rockerick in The Perfidious Brother by Lewis Theobald (1716)
- Pisano in The Traitor by Christopher Bullock (1718)
- Alucius in Scipio Africanus by Charles Beckingham (1718)
- Villeyor in Henry IV of France by Charles Beckingham (1719)
- Sir Julius Caesar in Sir Walter Raleigh by George Sewell (1719)
- Alcander in The Fatal Legacy by Jane Robe (1723)
- Alderman Quorum in The Beggar's Wedding by Charles Coffey (1729)
- Whim in The Fashionable Lady by James Ralph (1730)

== Bibliography ==
- Highfill, Philip H, Burnim, Kalman A. & Langhans, Edward A. A Biographical Dictionary of Actors, Actresses, Musicians, Dancers, Managers, and Other Stage Personnel in London, 1660–1800: Volume 14. SIU Press, 1978.
