= Mary Kent =

British actress

Mary Kent (before 1692 – after 1718) was an English actress, whose career lasted from 1692 to 1718. Her dates of birth and death are not known. She was the wife of Drury Lane actor Thomas Kent.

== Career ==
Mary Kent appeared in many playbills from 1692 onwards in London, playing minor parts in the United Company until the company's tumultuous breakup in 1695. She and her husband remained with the depleted parent troupe when the senior actors walked out to set up their own cooperative company, and during the consequent brief actor shortage at Drury Lane, she played more important parts, notably Flareit in Colley Cibber's Love's Last Shift and young Tom Fashion (as a breeches role) in John Vanbrugh's The Relapse in 1697. This role came at a time when it was common for boys to be portrayed by actresses and her casting was described as perhaps "an attempt to defuse the homosexual suggestions in his (Tom Fashion's) relationship with Coupler."

She continued to appear in minor roles at Drury Lane up to 1710, and had her first and only taste of female lead roles at the theatre operated by William Penkethman at Greenwich during the summer season of 1710. After this experience she did not return to supporting roles, but instead worked at a puppet theatre from 1710 to 1714. Only when John Rich opened his new theatrical enterprise in Lincoln's Inn Fields in December 1714 did she return to the stage, appearing in playbills for Rich's company up to 1718. That year she appeared in The Traitor by Christopher Bullock.

== Selected roles ==
- Rosamond's Woman in Henry II by William Mountfort (1692)
- Florence in The Maid's Last Prayer by Thomas Southerne (1693)
- Mrs Breeder in The Canterbury Guests by Edward Ravenscroft (1694)
- Nurse in Love Triumphant by John Dryden (1694)
- Bianca in Agnes de Castro by Catherine Trotter (1695)
- Flareit in Love's Last Shift by Colley Cibber (1696)
- Lady Young Love in The Lost Lover by Delarivier Manley (1696)
- Tom Fashion in The Relapse by John Vanbrugh (1697)
- Lettice in Woman's Wit by Colley Cibber (1697)
- Friskit in A Plot and No Plot by John Dennis (1697)
- Gusset in The Campaigners by Thomas D'Urfey (1698)
- Irene in The Generous Conqueror by Bevil Higgons (1701)
- Delia in The Bath by Thomas D'Urfey (1701)
- Isabella in The False Friend by John Vanbrugh (1702)
- Daria in All for the Better by Francis Manning (1702)
- Honoria in The Patriot by Charles Gildon (1702)
- Widow Purelight in Vice Reclaimed by Richard Wilkinson (1703)
- Zaida in The Faithful Bride of Granada by William Taverner (1704)
- Lady Youthful in The Doating Lovers by Newburgh Hamilton (1715)
- Lady Cardivant in The Northern Heiress by Mary Davys (1716)
- Orian's Mother in The Traitor by Christopher Bullock (1718)
- Mrs Prim in A Bold Stroke for a Wife by Susanna Centlivre (1718)
- Axarte in Scipio Africanus by Charles Beckingham (1718)
