= Theophilus Keene =

British actor

Theophilus Keene (1680–1718) was an Anglo-Irish stage actor and theatre manager.

Keene was from a Presbyterian background. He originally began acting at the Smock Alley Theatre in Dublin. Having arrived in London from Ireland in 1704, he appeared as part of the company at the Drury Lane Theatre until 1714. Along with Christopher Bullock he took over the management of the Lincoln's Inn Fields Theatre in 1717, at the time one of two patent theatres in London. The co-managers worked together for one season after replacing the "broke" John Rich before Keene's death after a fall from a horse while riding in the county.

Following his death in 1718 a biography of him Memoirs of the Life of Mr. Theophilus Keene was produced by Richard Savage.

== Selected roles ==
- Balance in The Recruiting Officer by George Farquhar (1706)
- Rodogune in The Royal Convert by Nicholas Rowe (1707)
- Memnon in The Persian Princess by Lewis Theobald (1708)
- Priscian in The Rival Fools by Colley Cibber (1709)
- Claudius in Appius and Virginia by John Dennis (1709)
- De Sale in The Successful Pyrate by Charles Johnson (1712)
- Lucius in Cato, a Tragedy by Joseph Addison (1713)
- Ulysses in The Victim by Charles Johnson (1714)
- Colonel Winfield in The Doating Lovers by Newburgh Hamilton (1715)
- Sebatian in The Perfidious Brother by Lewis Theobald (1716)
- Winwife in The Artful Husband by William Taverner (1717)

== Bibliography ==
- Highfill, Philip H, Burnim, Kalman A. & Langhans, Edward A. A Biographical Dictionary of Actors, Actresses, Musicians, Dancers, Managers, and Other Stage Personnel in London, 1660–1800: Garrick to Gyngell. SIU Press, 1978.
- Wanko, Cheryl. Roles of Authority: Thespian Biography and Celebrity in Eighteenth-century Britain. Texas Tech University Press, 2003.
