= The Imperial Captives =

1720 play

- Original language: English
- Written by: John Mottley
- Genre: Tragedy

Premiere
- Date: 29 February 1720
- Place: Lincoln's Inn Fields Theatre

The Imperial Captives is a 1720 tragedy by the British writer John Mottley.

The original cast included James Quin as Genseric, Lacy Ryan as Thrasimond, Anthony Boheme as Aspar, John Egleton as Honoric, Richard Diggs as Narbal, Anna Maria Seymour as Eudosia and Jane Rogers as Sophronia. The prologue was written by Charles Beckingham and the epilogue by Christopher Bullock.

== Bibliography ==
- Baines, Paul & Ferarro, Julian & Rogers, Pat. The Wiley-Blackwell Encyclopedia of Eighteenth-Century Writers and Writing, 1660-1789. Wiley-Blackwell, 2011.
- Burling, William J. A Checklist of New Plays and Entertainments on the London Stage, 1700-1737. Fairleigh Dickinson Univ Press, 1992.
