= John Galliard =

John Galliard may refer to:

- Johann Ernst Galliard, an eighteenth-century German composer
- Sir John Galliard, the protagonist of Mary Davys's The Accomplished Rake (1727)
