= The Persian Princess =

1708 play by Lewis Theobald

- Original language: English
- Written by: Lewis Theobald
- Genre: Tragedy

Premiere
- Date: 31 May 1708
- Place: Theatre Royal, Drury Lane

The Persian Princess is a 1708 tragedy by the British writer Lewis Theobald. It was performed at the Theatre Royal, Drury Lane. It is also written as The Persian Princess: or, The Royal Villain.

The play was not a great success and Theobald himself wrote disparagingly of it, although its acceptance to be staged at a major theatre suggests that it was seen as having merit. Along with his later work The Perfidious Brother, it has been examined for textual clues in light of the authorship of Double Falsehood a play that Theobald claimed to be based on a lost William Shakespeare work.

The original Drury Lane cast included Theophilus Keene as Memnon, Robert Wilks as Artaban, John Mills as Oxartes, Barton Booth as Mirvan, John Corey as Barzanes and Thomas Smith as High Priest.

== Bibliography ==
- Burling, William J. A Checklist of New Plays and Entertainments on the London Stage, 1700-1737. Fairleigh Dickinson Univ Press, 1992.
- Carnegie, Davis & Taylor, Gary. The Quest for Cardenio: Shakespeare, Fletcher, Cervantes, and the Lost Play. OUP Oxford, 2012.
- Jones, Richard Foster. Lewis Theobald: His Contribution to English Scholarship, with Some Unpublished Letters. AMS Press, 1966.
