= Henry IV of France (play) =

1719 play

- Written by: Charles Beckingham
- Original language: English
- Genre: Tragedy

Premiere
- Date premiered: 7 November 1719
- Place premiered: Lincoln's Inn Fields Theatre

Henry IV of France is a 1719 tragedy by the British writer Charles Beckingham. It portrays the reign of Henry IV of France, who was assassinated in 1610.

The play was written and produced a time when the Catholic Jacobite pretender James III was attempting to launch an invasion of Britain with the assistance of Spain, and reflects Whig concerns about Catholic power and the persecution of French Huguenots. Although a Catholic by the time of his death, Henry IV is portrayed as a defender of liberty and a victim of plotting by the Catholic factions at his court.

The original cast included James Quin as Henry, Lacy Ryan as Prince of Conde, John Leigh as Duke of Vendome, John Ogden as Duke of Boullion, Thomas Smith as Villeyor, Richard Diggs as Rosny, John Harper as Montmorency, Christopher Bullock as Nuncio, Anthony Boheme as French Bishop, John Egleton as François Ravaillac and Jane Rogers as Charlotta. The epilogue was written by George Sewell.

== Bibliography ==
- Burling, William J. A Checklist of New Plays and Entertainments on the London Stage, 1700-1737. Fairleigh Dickinson Univ Press, 1992.
- Streete, Adrian. Apocalypse and Anti-Catholicism in Seventeenth-Century English Drama. Cambridge University Press, 2017.
