= A Woman's Revenge =

A Woman's Revenge may refer to:

- A Woman's Revenge (play), 1715, by the British writer Christopher Bullock
- A Woman's Revenge (1921 film), a 1921 German film
- A Woman's Revenge (1990 film), a 1990 French film
- A Woman's Revenge (2012 film), a 2012 Portuguese film
- A Women's Revenge the debut album by rapper Feloni
