= Thomas Simpson (actor) =

English actor

Thomas Simpson (sometimes Sympson) was an English stage actor of the late 17th and early 18th centuries.

Simpson joined the United Company from the 1687–88 season, but his early roles are unknown. Following the 1695 split, he stayed at Drury Lane with Christopher Rich's company and acted in a number of roles until 1702. From 1703, he, William Bullock, and William Pinkethman operated a theatrical stall at Bartholomew Fair.

== Selected roles ==
- King in Agnes de Castro by Catherine Trotter (1695)
- Hottman Oroonoko by Thomas Southerne (1695)
- Curio in Neglected Virtue by Charles Hopkins (1696)
- Mufti in Ibrahim, the Thirteenth Emperor of the Turks by Mary Pix (1696)
- Don Leon in The Campaigners by Thomas D'Urfey (1698)
- Governor in Love Makes a Man by Colley Cibber (1700)
- Armando in The Perjured Husband by Susanna Centlivre (1700)
- Neoptolemus in The Virgin Prophetess by Elkanah Settle (1701)
- Du Law in The Unhappy Penitent by Catherine Trotter (1701)
- Lord Bellamy in Sir Harry Wildair by George Farquhar (1701)
- Meroan in The Generous Conqueror by Bevil Higgons (1701)
- Neoptolemus in The Virgin Prophetess by Elkanah Settle (1701)
- Uberto in The Patriot by Charles Gildon (1702)
- Mendez in All for the Better by Francis Manning (1702)

== Bibliography ==
- Highfill, Philip H, Burnim, Kalman A. & Langhans, Edward A. A Biographical Dictionary of Actors, Actresses, Musicians, Dancers, Managers, and Other Stage Personnel in London, 1660–1800: Volume 14. SIU Press, 1978.
