= Occasional Oratorio =

1746 oratorio by George Frideric Handel

An Occasional Oratorio
- Oratorio by G. F. Handel
- Portrait of Handel by Balthasar Denner
- Catalogue: HWV 62
- Occasion: Defeat of the Jacobite rebellion
- Text: Newburgh Hamilton
- Language: English
- Composed: January–February 1746
- Movements: 44 in three parts
- Vocal: SATB choir and solo
- Instrumental: 2 trumpets; principal; timpani; 2 oboes; 2 violins; viola; basso continuo

Premiere
- Date: 14 February 1746
- Location: Covent Garden Theatre
- Conductor: George Frideric Handel
- Performers: Willem de Fesch, Élisabeth Duparc, Elisabetta de Gambarini, John Beard, Thomas Reinhold

An Occasional Oratorio (HWV 62) is an oratorio by George Frideric Handel, based upon a libretto by Newburgh Hamilton after the poetry of John Milton and Edmund Spenser. The work was written in the midst of the Jacobite rising of 1745–1746, the attempt to overthrow Handel's patrons – the Hanoverian monarchy under George II – and replace them with a Stuart restoration under Charles Edward Stuart, "Bonnie Prince Charlie". The Occasional Oratorio is unique among Handel's works which he labelled "oratorio" in that it does not tell a story or contain elements of a drama, but was intended as a defiant and patriotic rallying piece.

== Jacobite rising ==
The Stuart armies, based in Scotland, had invaded England and got as far as Derby when the King's armies, under the command of his son Prince William, Duke of Cumberland, had driven them back to Scotland in December 1745. The fighting was at a hiatus due to winter weather and the Duke of Cumberland was in London in February 1746.

== Structure ==
Handel composed the Occasional Oratorio hastily in January and February 1746, borrowing and re-arranging some movements from previous compositions, and premiered it immediately on 14 February 1746 with Willem de Fesch, Élisabeth Duparc, Elisabetta de Gambarini, John Beard, and Thomas Reinhold at Covent Garden Theatre. It contains 44 movements split over three parts. Part One, generally speaking, concerns the miseries of war and the vengeance of a wrathful God, Part Two the blessings of peace, and Part Three a thanksgiving for victory. This was felt at the time by some to be premature as the rebels had not yet been defeated, Charles Jennens, Handel's friend and collaborator who wrote the text for Saul and others of Handel's oratorios, called the piece "a triumph for a victory not yet gained." The festive four-part overture, with trumpets and drums, is sometimes performed separately. The famous chorus "Prepare the Hymn" (a paraphrase of Psalm 81:1-2) is the 26th movement and appears in the second part as 2.10. Aria, Chorus: "To God, our strength, sing loud". The second minuet from the Music for the Royal Fireworks was reused from this oratorio. Handel's coronation anthem Zadok the Priest was also reused as the finale to the oratorio, but without the second movement "And all the people rejoic'd".

== List of musical numbers ==
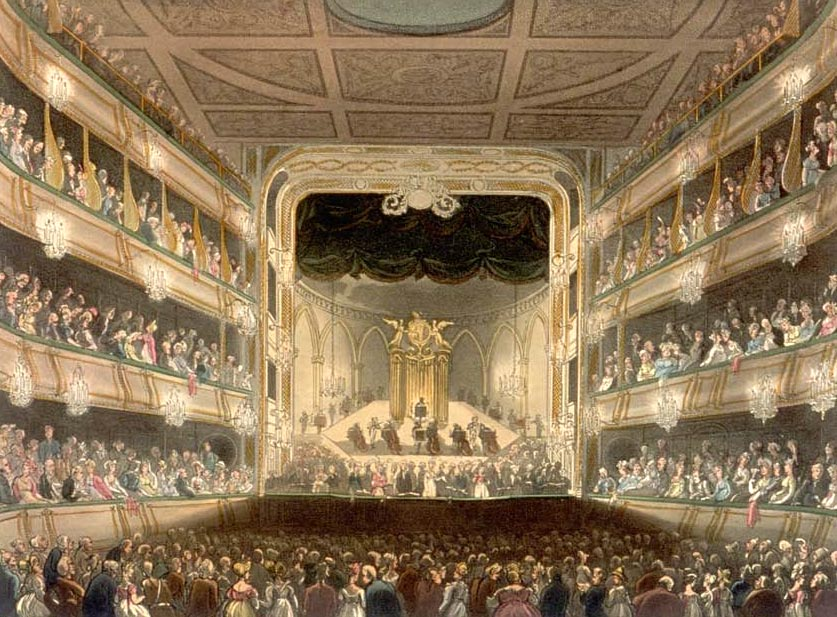
A picture of the theatre at Covent Garden where the Occasional Oratorio was first performed

=== Part I ===
- Overture
- 1.1. Arioso: Why do the gentiles tumult?
- 1.2. Chorus: Let us break off by strength of hand
- 1.3. Aria: O Lord, how many are my foes!
- 1.4. Chorus: Him or his God we not fear!
- 1.5. Aria: Jehovah, to my words give ear
- 1.6. Chorus: Him or his God we scorn to fear!
- 1.7. Recitative: The Highest who in Heaven doth dwell
- 1.8. Aria: O, who shall pour into my swollen eyes
- 1.9. Aria: Fly from the threat'ning vengeance, fly!
- 1.10. Accompagnato: Humbled with fear
- 1.11. Aria: His sceptre is the rod of righteousness
- 1.12. Aria: Be wise, be wise at length
- 1.13. Chorus: Be wise, be wise at length
- 1.14. Recitative: Of many millions the populous rout
- 1.15. Aria: Jehovah is my shield, my glory
- 1.16. Recitative: Fools or madmen stand not within
- 1.17. Chorus: God found them guilty

=== Part II ===
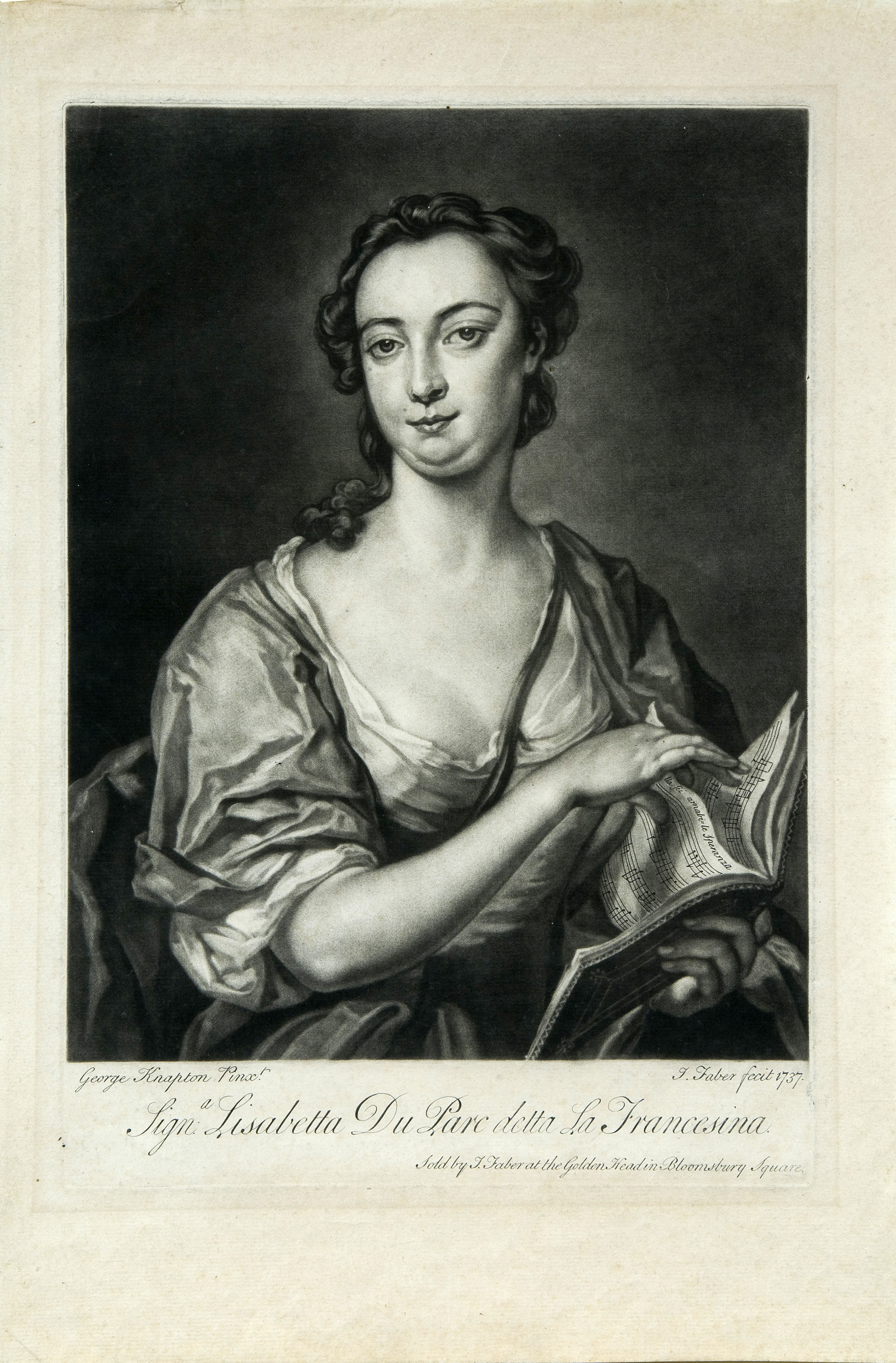
Élisabeth Duparc, soprano soloist in the original performances of the Occasional Oratorio

- 2.1. Aria: O liberty, thou choicest treasure
- 2.2. Recitative: Who trusts in God should ne'er despair
- 2.3. Aria: Prophetic visions strike my eye
- 2.4. Chorus mit Solo (alto): May God, from whom all mercies
- 2.5. Recitative: The Lord hath heard my pray'r
- 2.6. Aria: Then will I Jehovah's praise
- 2.7. Chorus: All his mercies shall endure
- 2.8. Aria: How great and many perils do enfold
- 2.9. Duett (soprano, alto): After long storms and tempests overblown
- 2.10. Aria, Chorus: To God, our strength, sing loud
- 2.11. Aria: He has his mansion fix'd on high
- 2.12. Chorus: Hallelujah, your voices raise

=== Part III ===
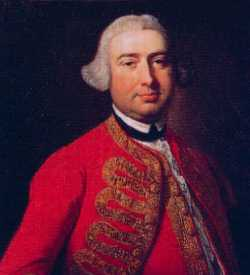
John Beard, tenor soloist in the original performances of the Occasional Oratorio

- 3.1. Sinfonia
- 3.2. Chorus: I will sing unto the Lord
- 3.3. Chorus: Who is like unto thee, O Lord?
- 3.4. Aria: When warlike ensigns wave on high
- 3.5. Recitative: The enemy said, I will pursue
- 3.6. Aria: The enemy said, I will pursue
- 3.7. Aria: The sword that's drawn in virtue's cause
- 3.8. Chorus: Millions unborn shall bless the hand
- 3.9. Recitative: When Israel, like the bounteous Nile
- 3.10. Aria: When Israel, like the bounteous Nile
- 3.11. Aria: Tyrants, whom no cov'nants bind
- 3.12. Accompagnato: May balmy peace, and wreath'd renown
- 3.13. Aria: May balmy peace, and wreath'd renown
- 3.14. Chorus: Blessed are all they that fear the Lord

== Recordings ==
- With Susan Gritton and Lisa Milne (sopranos), James Bowman (countertenor), John Mark Ainsley (tenor), Michael George (bass), The King's Consort, Choir of The King's Consort, New College Choir, Oxford, Robert King (conductor). Hyperion CD:CDAyomom66961/2. 2010.
- With Julia Doyle (soprano), Ben Johnson (tenor), Peter Harvey (baritone), Chor des Bayerischen Rundfunks and the Akademie für Alte Musik Berlin, Howard Arman, conductor. BR Klassik CD:900520. 2017.
