= Scipio Africanus (play) =

1718 play

- Original language: English
- Written by: Charles Beckingham
- Genre: Tragedy

Premiere
- Date: 18 February 1718
- Place: Lincoln's Inn Fields Theatre

Scipio Africanus is a 1718 historical tragedy by the British writer Charles Beckingham. It is inspired by the story of The Continence of Scipio, featuring the Ancient Roman general Scipio Africanus during the Second Punic War.

Staged at Lincoln's Inn Fields the cast included James Quin as Scipio, John Leigh as Trebellius, Sarah Thurmond as Almeyda, Jane Rogers as Semanthe, Thomas Smith as Alucius, John Corey as Lelius, John Ogden as Lucilius, Thomas Smith as Alucius, and Mary Kent as Axarte.

== Bibliography ==
- Burling, William J. A Checklist of New Plays and Entertainments on the London Stage, 1700-1737. Fairleigh Dickinson Univ Press, 1992.
