= The Doating Lovers =

Play by Newburgh Hamilton

- Original language: English
- Written by: Newburgh Hamilton
- Genre: Comedy

Premiere
- Date: 23 June 1715
- Place: Lincoln's Inn Fields Theatre

The Doating Lovers: Or, the Libertine Tam'd is a 1715 comedy play by the Irish writer Newburgh Hamilton.

The original cast included John Leigh as Gaylove, William Bullock as Sir Butterfly Ayrewould, Christopher Bullock as Sr Timothy Twiddle, Theophilus Keene as Colonel Winfield, Benjamin Griffin as Choleric, George Pack as Decoy, Francis Leigh as Thump, Mary Kent as Lady Youthful, Sarah Thurmond as Cosmelia and Letitia Cross as Clarinda.

== Bibliography ==
- Burling, William J. A Checklist of New Plays and Entertainments on the London Stage, 1700-1737. Fairleigh Dickinson Univ Press, 1992.
- Nicoll, Allardyce. A History of Early Eighteenth Century Drama: 1700-1750. CUP Archive, 1927.
