= The False Friend (Vanbrugh play) =

Play by John Vanbrugh

- Original language: English
- Written by: John Vanbrugh
- Genre: Comedy

Premiere
- Date: January 1702
- Place: Drury Lane Theatre

The False Friend is a 1702 comedy play by the English writer John Vanbrugh. It was inspired by Francisco de Rojas Zorrilla's Spanish play La traición busca el castigo.

The original Drury Lane cast included Robert Wilks as Don Pedro, Philip Griffin as Don Felix, John Mills as Don Guzman, Colley Cibber as Don John, William Pinkethman as Lopez, William Bullock as Galindo, Jane Rogers as Leonora, Mary Kent as Isabella and Anne Oldfield as Jacinta.

== Bibliography ==
- Burling, William J. A Checklist of New Plays and Entertainments on the London Stage, 1700-1737. Fairleigh Dickinson Univ Press, 1992.
- Downes, Kerry. Sir John Vanbrugh. Sidgwick & Jackson, 1987,
