= The Patriot (play) =

1702 play

- Original language: English
- Written by: Charles Gildon
- Genre: Tragedy

Premiere
- Date: November 1702
- Place: Theatre Royal, Drury Lane

The Patriot, or, The Italian Conspiracy is a 1702 tragedy by the English writer Charles Gildon. Based on the life of Cosimo de' Medici but also inspired by Nathaniel Lee's 1680 work Lucius Junius Brutus set during the Roman Republic.

The original Drury Lane cast included John Mills as Cosimo De Medici, Benjamin Husband as Lorenzo, Thomas Simpson as Uberto, Thomas Kent as Donato, Philip Griffin as Rimini, Jane Rogers as Teraminta and Mary Kent as Honoria. The prologue was by John Dennis and the epilogue by George Farquhar. Incidental music was composed by Daniel Purcell.

== Bibliography ==
- Burling, William J. A Checklist of New Plays and Entertainments on the London Stage, 1700-1737. Fairleigh Dickinson Univ Press, 1992.
- Nicoll, Allardyce. History of English Drama, 1660-1900, Volume 2. Cambridge University Press, 2009.
