= The Campaigners =

1698 play

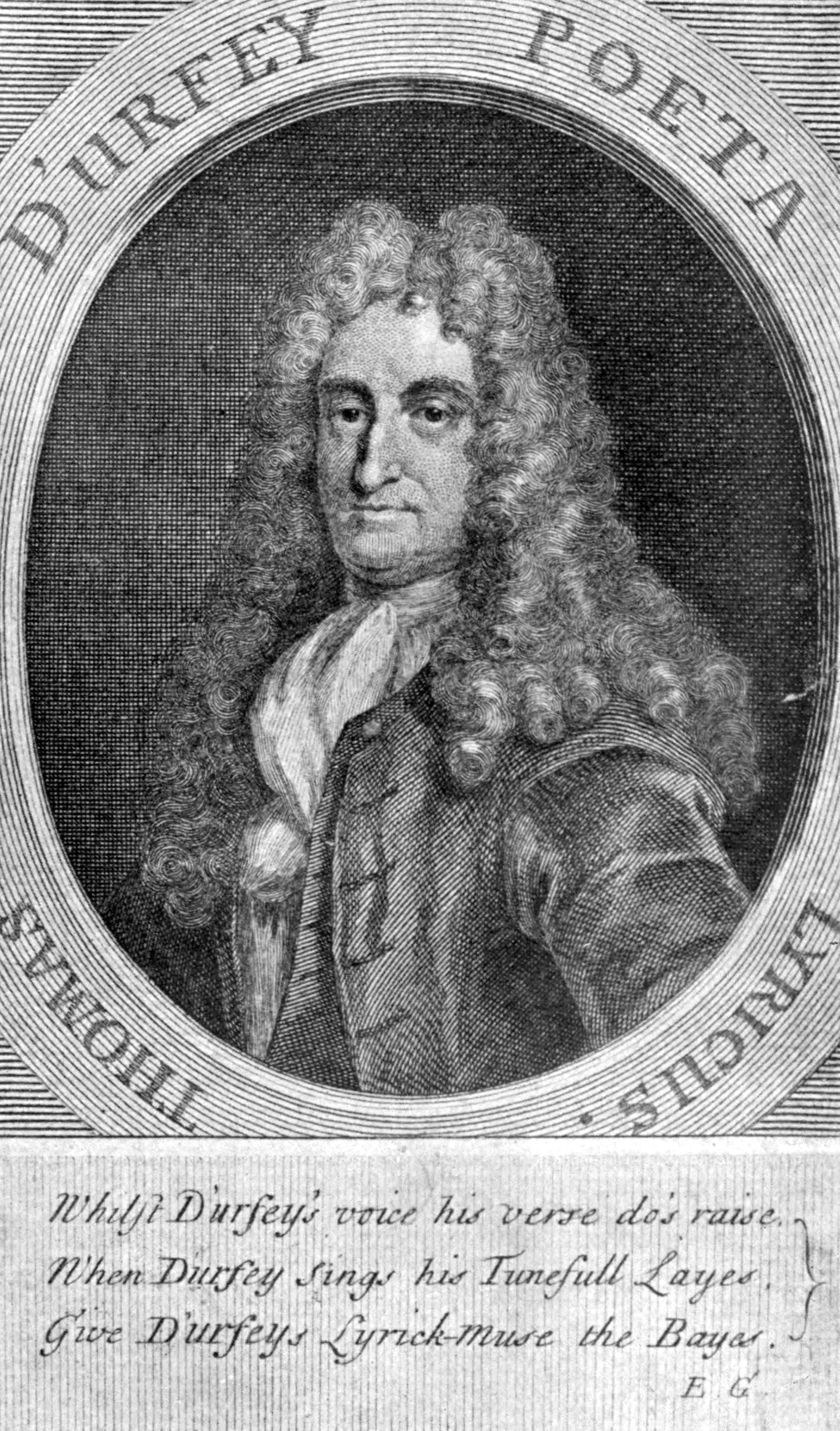
- Original language: English
- Written by: Thomas D'Urfey
- Genre: Restoration Comedy

Premiere
- Date: June 1698
- Place: Theatre Royal, Drury Lane, London

The Campaigners; Or, The Pleasant Adventures At Brussels is a 1698 comedy play by the English writer Thomas D'Urfey. It was first staged at the Theatre Royal, Drury Lane by Christopher Rich's Company.

The original Drury Lane cast included Thomas Simpson as Don Leon, Benjamin Johnson as The Sieur Bondevelt, John Mills as Colonel Darange, Tobias Thomas as Kinglove, William Pinkethman as Min Heer Tomas, Colley Cibber as Marqui Bertran, William Bullock as Mascarillo, Frances Maria Knight as Angellica, Susanna Verbruggen as Madam la Marquise, Mary Powell as Anniky and Mary Kent as Gusset.

== Bibliography ==
- McVeagh, John. Thomas Durfey and Restoration Drama: The Work of a Forgotten Writer. Routledge, 2017.
- Van Lennep, W. The London Stage, 1660-1800: Volume One, 1660-1700. Southern Illinois University Press, 1960.
