= Woman Is a Riddle =

1716 play

- Original language: English
- Written by: Christopher Bullock
- Genre: Comedy

Premiere
- Date: 4 December 1716
- Place: Lincoln's Inn Fields Theatre

Woman Is a Riddle is a 1716 comedy play by the British actor Christopher Bullock. Sometimes its title is written as A Woman Is a Riddle.

Richard Savage may have assisted with the writing of the play, which draws inspiration from a seventeenth century Spanish work The Phantom Lady by Pedro Calderón de la Barca. In 1788 Woman Is a Riddle was reworked as an afterpiece called The Invisible Mistress performed at Drury Lane.

The original Lincoln's Inn Fields cast includes John Leigh as Colonel Manly, Christopher Bullock himself as Sir Amorous Vainwit, Thomas Elrington as Charles Courtwell, William Bullock as Vulture, James Spiller as Aspin, John Ogden as Butler, Jane Rogers as Lady Outside and Letitia Cross as Miranda.

== Bibliography ==
- Burling, William J. A Checklist of New Plays and Entertainments on the London Stage, 1700-1737. Fairleigh Dickinson Univ Press, 1992.
- Nicoll, Allardyce. A History of Early Eighteenth Century Drama: 1700-1750. CUP Archive, 1927.
