= John Jeffreyson =

English-born judge in Ireland

Sir John Jeffreyson (1635–1700) was an English-born judge whose entire judicial career was spent in Ireland. He was unusual among Irish judges of the time in holding the rank of English Serjeant-at-law. He was considered an outstanding lawyer, and was noted for his staunchly Tory political views.

== Early life ==
He was born in Durham, son of John Jeffreyson, a mercer, and Margaret Walton, daughter of Hugh Walton, an alderman of the city. He went to school in Guisborough and matriculated from St John's College, Cambridge in 1652.

== Career ==
He entered Gray's Inn in 1651 and was called to the Bar in 1661. He became Recorder of Durham in 1679, a Bencher of Gray's Inn in 1682 and Serjeant in 1683.

He was a convinced Tory in politics and a close friend of the noted loyalist cleric Thomas Cartwight, Bishop of Chester, but after the Glorious Revolution, unlike Bishop Cartwright, he did not follow King James II into exile. He strongly supported the King's policy of religious toleration, and was recommended for promotion to the English High Court bench in 1688 as a reward for his good service to the Crown.

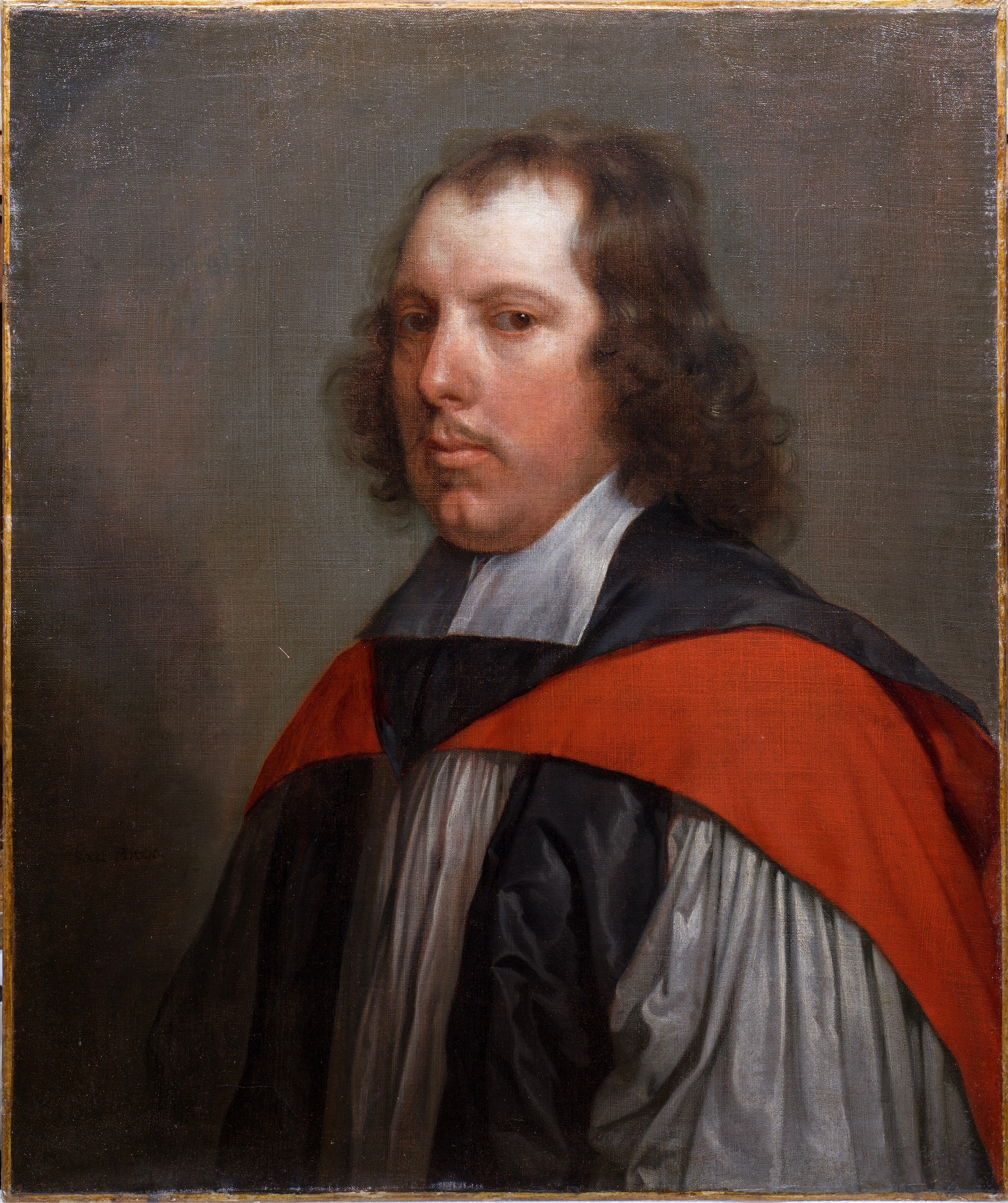
Thomas Cartwight, Bishop of Chester

== Judge in Ireland ==
His career was not permanently damaged by the Glorious Revolution. Perhaps surprisingly, given his record of loyalty to the previous regime, he was sent to Ireland as a judge of the Court of Common Pleas (Ireland) in 1690: presumably, his experience and legal ability were thought to outweigh his Tory opinions, although this tolerant attitude did not last. He joined the King's Inn and was knighted in 1692. He was made a member of the Privy Council of Ireland in 1693. His political views inevitably led to conflict at a time when the Irish Bench was riven with political differences: he was removed from the Privy Council in 1695 but restored to his place on it in 1697. He acted as Commissioner of the Great Seal of Ireland 1696–7. As was customary then for High Court judges he attended the Irish House of Lords to act as their legal adviser.

== Death and family ==
He died in 1700 and was buried in St. Peter's Church, Aungier Street, Dublin (which was demolished in 1983).

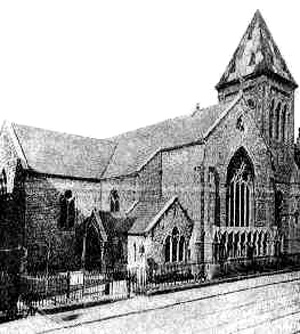
St. Peter's Church, Aungier Street, Dublin, now demolished, where Jeffreyson was buried

He married Elizabeth Cole of Gateshead in 1664; they had one daughter, Margaret, who married Captain Walker. Margaret was a friend of the Irish-born author, Mary Davys, who dedicated her first novel, The Amours of Alcippus and Lucippe, later renamed The Lady's Tale (1704) to Margaret. Mrs Davys in the dedication praises Margaret's "unexceptional temper", and refers to their old acquaintance in England, suggesting that their friendship was of long standing.

Elrington Ball described Jeffreyson as a fine lawyer, but a Tory above all.
