= The Bath (play) =

Play by Thomas d'Urfey

- Original language: English
- Written by: Thomas d'Urfey
- Genre: Comedy

Premiere
- Date: 31 May 1701
- Place: Theatre Royal, Drury Lane, London

The Bath; or, The Western Lass is a 1701 comedy play by the English writer Thomas d'Urfey.

The original Drury Lane cast included Philip Griffin as Lord Lovechace, Henry Norris as Sir Oliver Oldgame, Benjamin Johnson as Sir Carolus Codshead, John Mills as Colonel Philip, William Pinkethman as Charles, William Bullock as Harry, Colley Cibber as Crab, Frances Maria Knight as Lydia, Jane Rogers as Sophronia, Mary Kent as Delia, Susanna Verbruggen as Gillian and Henrietta Moore as Combrush.

== Bibliography ==
- Burling, William J. A Checklist of New Plays and Entertainments on the London Stage, 1700-1737. Fairleigh Dickinson Univ Press, 1992.
