= The Traitor (1718 play) =

1718 play

- Original language: English
- Written by: Christopher Bullock
- Genre: Tragedy

Premiere
- Date: 11 October 1718
- Place: Lincoln's Inn Fields Theatre

The Traitor (often spelt as The Traytor) is a tragedy published anonymously in 1718 and commonly attributed to the British writer and actor Christopher Bullock. It is a revised version of the 1631 play of the same title by James Shirley. It was Bullock's only effort to write tragedy, as his other works were all farces.

It was staged at the Lincoln's Inn Fields Theatre with a cast that included John Leigh as the Duke, Lacy Ryan as Sciarrah, James Quin as Lorenzo, Christopher Bullock as Cosmo, John Egleton as Florio, Thomas Smith as Pisano, William Bullock as Depazzi, Thomas Smith as Pisano, John Ogden as Petruchio, Jane Rogers as Amidea, Anna Maria Seymour as Oriana and Mary Kent as Orian's Mother. Lasting six performances on its original run, it was revived again in 1719 and 1720, with much the same cast. No further attempts were made to stage either this play or Shirley's original for more than a century.

== Bibliography ==
- Burling, William J. A Checklist of New Plays and Entertainments on the London Stage, 1700–1737. London and Cranbury, NJ: Associated University Presses, 1993.
- Carter, John Stuart, ed. John Shirley: The Traitor. Lincoln, NE: University of Nebraska Press, 1965.
- Donohue, Joseph W., Jr. Dramatic Character in the English Romantic Age. Princeton: Princeton University Press, 2015.
- Nicoll, Allardyce. A History Of Early Eighteenth Century Drama, 1700-1750, 2nd ed. Cambridge: Cambridge University Press, 1929.
