= The Reform'd Coquet =

The Reform'd Coquet, alternately titled The Memoirs of Amoranda, is a novella, about 70 pages long, written by Mary Davys and published in 1724. It is an important work in helping to establish the form of the novel: according to feminist critic and anthologist Paula R. Backscheider, The Reform'd Coquet "shows the influence of Restoration and eighteenth-century marriage comedies; It was immediately popular and went through seven editions by 1760."

== Plot summary ==
Amoranda's grandfather was primarily interested in "whoring and drinking" and lost his estates. Her father's brother had made a fortune as a merchant and repurchased the family's estate, which he gave to Amoranda's father. When Amoranda's parents die, her uncle is made her guardian. Because he is engaged in his business, he sends an elderly man, Formater, to be a guardian in his absence.

The years had given her much appeal and grace, and she was greatly desired "for ten Parishes round." Lord Lofty was chief among her admirers, and while he was waiting to visit her one morning, he found a letter on the ground, written by a woman and directed to Amoranda, warning her that Lofty "carries nothing but Ruin to our whole sex." He proceeded to put the letter in his pocket and did not mention it to Amoranda. Amoranda later realised that Lofty had stolen her letter, but she remained mute on the matter. The arrival of the letter's author, Altemira, disguised as a young man, causes his deeds to be revealed. Lord Lofty had promised to marry Altemira or pay her ten thousand pounds. However, the night before they were to be married, he convinced her to sleep with him and had a maid steal the contract he had written. Pitying her, Amoranda successfully schemes to make Lord Lofty marry Altemira to salvage her reputation.

Later, Amoranda's childhood friend, Arentia, with her friend Berintha, come to visit. They are suspicious of Formator, and Formator believes Berintha is actually a man. Amoranda spends a good deal of time with them and comes to the same conclusion. After a few days, they desire to go on a boat trip down the river with her. Amoranda goes with them against Formator's advice, and Berintha reveals himself to be Biranthus, a man. Biranthus, aided by servants he had planted in her household, kidnaps her. Although two of her loyal servants overcome four of the others, Biranthus has already escaped into the woods with Amoranda and Arentia. Arentia gets bitten by an adder, or venomous snake, and dies. A man who calls himself Alanthus shows up on horseback, and Amoranda pleads for his help. After Biranthus attempts to shoot Alanthus with a pistol, one of Alanthus's men kills him with his sword. Meanwhile, barge-men friendly to Amoranda have retaken her boat, and they return to her home.

Later, Amoranda's stables catch fire in the night and Formator hastily runs to her bedroom. In doing so, he forgets to put on his beard, and when Amoranda looks at him she sees Alanthus. He hands her a letter from her uncle stating that Alanthus, a marquis, is the man that he has chosen for her to marry if they like one another. Shortly thereafter, Lady Betty and Amoranda's uncle both show up and the couple are married that afternoon; a week later they all go to London.

== Editions ==
- Davys, Mary (1724). The Reform'd Coquet (1st ed.). H. Woodfall (printer). OCLC 15864452.
- The Reform'd Coquet and Familiar Letters Betwixt a Gentleman and a Lady, by Mary Davys. with The Mercenary Lover, by Eliza Haywood. Garland Pub., 1973. OCLC 584335
- The Reform'd Coquet; or, Memoirs of Amoranda; Familiar Letters Betwixt a Gentleman and a Lady; and, The Accomplish'd Rake, or, A Modern Fine Gentleman, Martha F. Bowden, editor. University Press of Kentucky, c1999. ISBN 0-8131-0969-8
