= The Northern Heiress =

1716 play

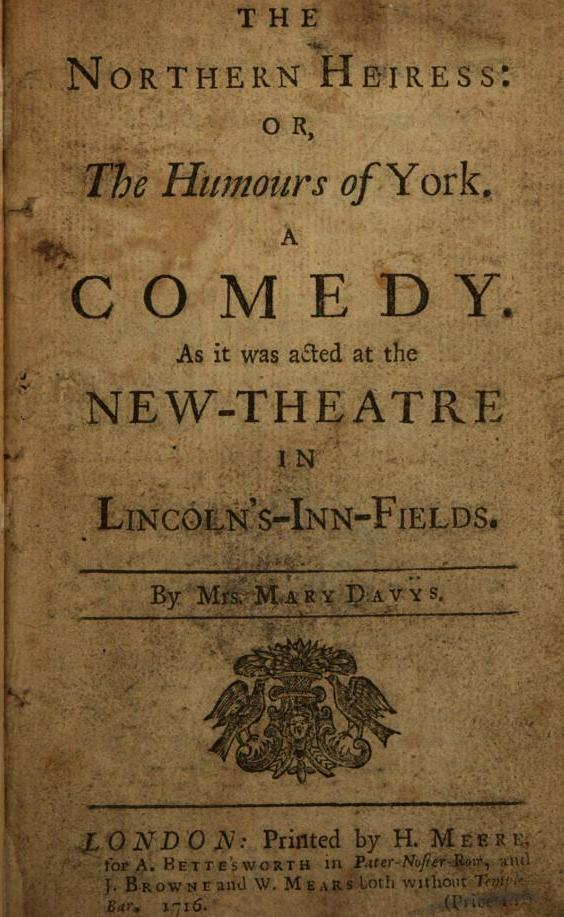
- Original language: English
- Written by: Mary Davys
- Genre: Comedy

Premiere
- Date: 27 April 1716
- Place: Lincoln's Inn Fields Theatre

The Northern Heiress is a 1716 comedy by the Irish-born writer Mary Davys. Its fuller title is The Northern Heiress, or, The Humours of York.

The play satirizes the contemporary marriage market. It was dedicated to Princess Anne, daughter of George, Prince of Wales. Because of this it has been inferred that Davys was a strong Whig supporter of the Hanoverian Succession. However, the dedication may have been the attempt of a struggling author to try to secure patronage in the wake of the recent Jacobite rebellion.

The original cast featured John Leigh as Gamont, Christopher Bullock as Welby, William Bullock as Sir Loobily Joddrell, Sarah Thurmond as Isabella, Jane Rogers as Louisa, Mary Kent as Lady Cardivant and Frances Maria Knight as Lady Ample.

== Bibliography ==
- Burling, William J. A Checklist of New Plays and Entertainments on the London Stage, 1700-1737. Fairleigh Dickinson Univ Press, 1992.
- Womersley. David. "Cultures of Whiggism": New Essays on English Literature and Culture in the Long Eighteenth Century. University of Delaware Press, 2005.
