= Elisabetta de Gambarini =

British musician (1731–1765)

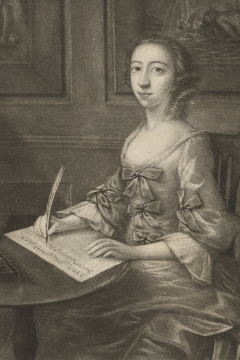
- Portrait by Nathaniel Hone
- Born: 7 September 1731; London, England
- Died: 9 February 1765 (aged 33); London, England

Elisabetta de Gambarini (7 September 1731 – 9 February 1765) was an English composer, singer, organist, harpsichordist, pianist, orchestral conductor and painter of the 18th century. Elisabetta's music is considered late Baroque and Classical music. She achieved distinction as an all-around musician, performing on, and composing for a variety of instruments as well as voice. Her compositions were known to reflect that of vocal work instead of instrumental patterns. She was the first female composer in Britain to publish a collection of keyboard music. Some sources describe her voice type as a singer as a soprano, and others as a mezzo-soprano.

== Family ==
Elisabetta de Gambarini was born 7 September 1731 in Holles Street, St Marylebone, Middlesex, England. She was born to Charles Gambarini (died 1754), Counsellor to the Landgrave of Hessen-Kassel and Joanna (Giovanna Paula) Stradiotti (died 1774). Her father was a nobleman from Lucca, Italy. He published A Description of the Earl of Pembroke's Pictures in 1731. Her mother was of similar status from Dalmatia. Her mother may have been a tutor to the nobility but it is not certain. Elisabetta was the third of four children. She was the only sibling to survive to maturity. Her name has appeared several other ways: her first name as Elizabeth, Elisabetta, or Elisabetti and her family name as Gambarini, de Gambarini, Gamberini, or Gambarene.

== Marriage ==
On 20 March 1764, Elisabetta married Etienne Chazal at St Martin-in-the-Fields. She gave one concert as Mrs Chazal in May, but died at her home in Castle Court, Strand, in the parish of St Martin-in-the-Fields, Westminster, less than a year later, on 9 February 1765. She was buried at St James's, Westminster, on 14 February. Her mother's will reveals that Elisabetta had a daughter, Giovanna Georgiana Chazal. Elisabetta may have died in or as a result of childbirth but it is not known for certain. This was common during this time. There is no additional information known of either her husband or her daughter.

== Education ==
There is no specific information regarding Elisabetta de Gambarini's formal musical education, however there is speculation that she may have studied with Francesco Geminiani, composer of The Inchanted Forest.

There was increased participation of women in music-making in the eighteenth century. It is known that French women undertook music instruction at a young age, under the guidance of a music master before marriage and family responsibilities intervened. Many women involved in music were noblewomen or were from families of other musicians. It is known that during the Classical period the number of women involved in domestic music making increased significantly because of the popularity of singing and playing the piano, and also because the middle class was expanding.

Music was considered a social accomplishment for women, which reflected on the gentility of one's family, filled leisure time and drove away ennui, and in the case of a young women, it was an asset in procuring a husband. Amateur musicians as well as trained professionals were playing. Young ladies became involved in music by playing concerts in their homes and later as court musicians. They sang and played the lute or the harpsichord for their private amusement and occasionally retained small staffs of musicians -perhaps even including a composer – for their own entertainments. The lute and the harpsichord by their nature were sufficient unto themselves or could serve to support the player's own voice. Playing bowed string instruments was less appealing as a pastime because of the unladylike position required for playing the larger bowed string instruments. Because of this, many eighteenth century women took up the smallest member of the viol family, the pardessus.

== Career ==
Elisabetta began her career singing in Handel's Occasional Oratorio (1746–1747). She also performed as the First Israelite Woman at the first performance and sang in Judas Maccabaeus (1747) and Joseph and his Brethren (1747). Her name also appears in scores of Handel's Samson and Messiah; however the exact dates are unknown.

By 1748, Elisabetta's reputation allowed her to promote and perform her own benefit concert. She sang and played her own compositions with the organ. She also issued her first two volumes of music. She was the first female composer in Britain to publish a collection of keyboard music, The Six Sets of Lessons for the Harpsichord, published in her teens, dedicated to Viscountess Howe of the Kingdom of Ireland. Her music had many subscribers, among them were famous musicians, Handel and Francesco Geminiani as well as dukes, lawyers, barons, sirs, lords as well as captains. Later that year she published Lessons for the Harpsichord Intermix'd with Italian and English Songs, dedicated to the Prince of Wales. Later she also published XII English & Italian Songs, for a German flute and Thorough Bass...Opera III in 1750 composed primarily for woodwind players and dedicated to the Duke of Marlborough.

Throughout her career, Elisabetta performed at the Haymarket Theatre and the great Concert Room in Dean Street, Soho. Later in her career, she gave several benefit concerts, appearing as composer, harpsichordist, organist, and singer. During one of her benefit concerts, she borrowed Francesco Geminiani's score The Inchanted Forest, for this reason there are those that believe she could have been one of his students. There is also information that she may have sought a court appointment during this time.

== Women in music ==
As the eighteenth century progressed, the social class of the women who composed music and what they chose to compose changed. Whereas seventeenth century noble women wrote simple songs for their families and friends to perform, the daughters of musicians and composers gradually began composing in more ambitious genres: sacred and secular cantata and cantatille, opera, ballet, comic opera, and even oratorio. We do know that many women were achieving musically during this time period. The greater participation of women in music, traditionally associated exclusively with men, is largely attributable to political and social happenings across Europe in the early to mid-eighteenth century.

Significant and far reaching developments in music are also credited to the invention of the piano and its concomitant solo and chamber literature- which also played a decisive role in creating a musical climate conducive to a greater involvement of women as composers. The lied also attracted many female composers, resulting in many fine pieces of music written by women. From its inception the lied constituted a type of chamber music and as such fit comfortably in a domestic environment, a setting in which women had long been accepted as performers, in clear contrast to the public area, whose large scale operas, sacred music and Orchestral music had been off limits to women. It is unclear if Elisabetta de Gambarini composed lied music; however, we do know that other female composers such as Corona Schröter and Maria Theresia Paradis were lied composers.

== Repertoire ==
Elisabetta's Six Sets of Lessons for the Harpsichord are pleasant two-voice compositions (except for the March in Sonata IV, which is in three voices). In 1759 she published three sets of songs and harpsichord pieces written between 1748 and 1750. (Songs 1–4 are English, 5 is French, 6–12 are Italian.) They are short pieces, the longest being 53 measures, not counting repeats. The lyrics were based on moral lessons or classical allusions. Eighteenth-century concert programmes usually did not have consecutive pieces in the same genre. The forty minutes of music may also have been too short in length for an entire concert. Interrupting the music for the performance of songs or keyboard pieces may therefore have been a good solution. The word intermixed in the title of Elisabetta de Gambarini's Opus 2: Lessons for the Harpsichord Intermix'd with Italian and English evince many of the characteristics of vocal writing; a textual basis, compact range, strophic style, abbreviated length, and the absence of multi-movement structure. Like other pieces of this genre, her songs could be performed in a variety of ways: by voice, flute, keyboard, voice and flute together alternating segments. Her writing style was simple with uncomplicated keyboard writing, many being spirited and attractive.

- The Six Sets of Lessons for the Harpsichord (Op. 1), 1748
- Lessons for the Harpsichord Intermix'd with Italian and English Songs (Op. 2), 1748
- XII English & Italian Songs, for a German flute and Thorough Bass...Opera III
- War March
- Victory for voice and organ
- Forest Scene for horns and timpani
- Tho Mars, Still Friends to France
- The Friendly Wish
- Forgive Ye Fair
- Honour, Riches, Marriage-Blessing from The Tempest
- Overture for French horns
- Overtures
- Organ concertos
- Solos for piano and violin
- Ode for chorus

== Instruments played ==
Violin, Harpsichord, Piano, Organ

== Recordings ==
- 18th Century Women Composers – Music for Solo Harpsichord, Vol. 1. Barbara Harbach, harpsichord. Gasparo Records GSCD-272 (1995)
- Anthony Noble, Elizabeth Gambarini: Complete Works for Harpsichord. Herald Records HAVPCD 244 (2000)
- Elisabetta De Gambarini: Complete Works for Keyboard, Margherita Torretta, piano, Piano Classics (November 2024)
