= The Virgin Prophetess =

1701 play

- Original language: English
- Written by: Elkanah Settle
- Genre: Tragedy

Premiere
- Date: 12 May 1701
- Place: Theatre Royal, Drury Lane

The Virgin Prophetess, or The Fate of Troy is a 1701 tragedy by Elkanah Settle featuring music by Gottfried Finger. It is a semi-opera with masque-like elements breaking up the scenes.

The original cast included John Mills as Menelaus, Philip Griffin as Ulysses, Thomas Simpson as Neoptolemus, Robert Wilks as Paris, Anne Oldfield as Helen and Jane Rogers as Cassandra.

== Bibliography ==
- Burling, William J. A Checklist of New Plays and Entertainments on the London Stage, 1700-1737. Fairleigh Dickinson Univ Press, 1992.
