= The Accomplished Rake =

The Accomplish’d Rake, written by Mary Davys and published in 1727, provides a psychological account and transformation of the stock figure of the Rake, detailing the life and exploits of Sir John Galliard, a “modern fine gentlemen” In her work, Davys sought to create a realistic character details, focusing on moral development and reform of her heroes and heroines.

== Plot summary ==
=== Dedication to the Beaus of Great-Britain: ===
Davys dedicated the text to the Beaus of Great Britain, stating that she is “draw[ing] the Character of a Rake” and “lay[ing] it under the Protection of a Beau.” In her preface to the Beaus, Davys also proposes that it is an example of the “bad taste of the age” that the actions of the Beaus are seen as inferior.

Davys begins the text by describing Sir John’s family: his mother has the “best blood in the Nation” but lacks education and is temperamental. Likewise, his mother cares more for pleasure than for the domestic affairs of the household. Sir John’s father was a good man who looked on his wife with pity, but died of smallpox when Sir John was fourteen. His father’s dying request was that his wife teach his young son and daughter be given “an early notion of virtue and honor.” He encourages his son to “despise and shun those Libertines who may strive to poison your Morals, be dutiful to your Mother, love your Sister, and marry a Woman of virtue.” Upon his father’s death, Sir John is left sole heir of the estate.

Following his father’s death, Sir John spends two years in “careless lethargy” until Mr. Friendly, a dear friend of his father, intervenes. Mr. Friendly invites the Galliard family to dinner, and introduces his footman, Tom. Mr. Friendly explains that Tom was born a gentleman, but was spoiled for twenty years by his mother. When Tom’s mother died, the family estate was left to his uncle, who cheated him out of the fortune. Because he had squandered what money he had on gambling, Tom is forced to become a footman. Lady Galliard and Sir John realize Mr. Friendly told Tom’s story because he feared Sir John would have a similar fate. Mr. Friendly then proposes that Sir John begin learning from his acquaintance, a tutor named Mr. Teachwell. Sir John accepts the proposition, and asks that in exchange Tom become his footman. Mr. Friendly obliges and Tom becomes a member of the Galliard household. Two years later, Tom’s uncle dies and with Sir John’s permission, he makes plans to leave to attend to his affairs. Mr. Teachwell proposes that he and Sir John embark on a trip to France or Italy, so as to further Sir John’s education. Teachwell hopes that Sir John will choose to attend Cambridge.

Once Lady Galliard has left, Teachwell tells Sir John of his mother’s affair with the footman, Tom. Distraught, Sir John asks Teachwell if all women are like his mother. Sir John resolves to catch his mother in the act of adultery. Later that night, Sir John confronts Lady Galliard about her affair. Sir John angrily resolves to go to London to seek pleasure rather than go to Cambridge. On his way to London, Sir John encounters Mr. Friendly and his daughter. Meanwhile, Tom—now married—returns to work at the Galliard estate. Tom continues his affair with Lady Galliard, which his wife discovers. Tom tells Lady Galliard he will not speak a word of the affair in exchange for a large sum of money. Three months later, Tom’s wife dies of what is probably a sexually transmitted infection from Lady Galliard.

Mr. Friendly dies of consumption in Bath, and Sir John travels to London to stay with Mr. Friendly and his daughter. After a period of time, Mr. Friendly leaves London to travel to the country, leaving Sir John alone in the city. Sir John quickly falls into gambling, drinking and associating with other Rakes. Sir John encounters Miss Friendly, Mr. Friendly’s daughter, at a play, and resolves to have sex with her. He devises a plan to drug macaroons and give them to Miss Friendly, and rape her while she is incapacitated. His plan succeeds, and Miss Friendly retains no knowledge of what has happened. Later, Sir John discovers that his sister has been abducted by Tom and forced into prostitution and is about to be raped. Sir John intervenes and is about to attack Tom when Tom reveals that he is seeking revenge against the Galliard family because he believes Lady Galliard killed his wife by causing him to unknowingly transmit a sexual disease to her. Lady Galliard arrives at Sir John’s dwelling and they discuss the event. Sir John asks about the state of the Friendlys, and Lady Galliard explains that Miss Friendly is pregnant and that the entire family is in ruin and despair. Sir John begins to regret his actions.

Sir John then becomes intrigued with a woman named Belinda, who he intends seduce or rape. Belinda narrowly avoids assault using wit and guile. Sir John is punished by a man whose wife he seeks to sleep with by setting off fireworks that light Sir John on fire. Sir John returns home and visits Miss Friendly. Her child bears an uncanny resemblance to Sir John. Miss Friendly maintains that she has never slept with a man, and has become the mockery of the town. Sir John confesses his misdeed to Miss Friendly and decides to marry her. Miss Friendly agrees but requests partial ownership to his estate, and that her son be named full heir by an act of Parliament.

Davys ends the tale by stating that she will keep watch over Sir John, and report any relapses in his character by “advertisement to the Public”

== Critical reception ==
Davys, like many 18th century female writers, received little recognition during her lifetime. The Accomplish’d Rake is considered Davys’s finest novel, though like all her works it was out of print until the mid-twentieth century Davys is credited with establishing a framework that influenced the overall structure of the modern novel, including the idea that a novel must be grounded in real life, and that character development is just as important as plot. The idea that novels should be rooted in realism, as well as the humor in much of her texts is a reflection of her middle-class existence The Accomplish’d Rake provides interesting insight into gender relations and ideas of women in 18th century life. Many of Davys’s female characters are raped and married or pressured into marriage, which suggests a desire for a “utopian husband”. In addition to utilizing stock dramatic characters such as the Rake, Davys also used devices such as “a misplaced letter, an overheard conversation or a lost snuff box” to contribute to plot intricacies and overall structural flow. Davys is often seen as a forerunner of many later novelists, such as Henry Fielding …”
