= A Woman's Revenge (play) =

1715 play

- Original language: English
- Written by: Christopher Bullock
- Genre: Comedy

Premiere
- Date: 24 October 1715
- Place: Lincoln's Inn Fields Theatre

A Woman's Revenge, or a Match in Newgate is a 1715 comedy play by the British writer Christopher Bullock. It was originally performed as an afterpiece to another work The Lucky Prodigal. With its Newgate Prison setting and cynical references to corruption, it could be regarded as a precursor to John Gay's hit The Beggar's Opera of a decade later.

The cast included William Bullock as Thinkwell, John Thurmond as Bevil, Christopher Bullock as Vizard and Sarah Thurmond as Corinna. George, Prince of Wales attended the first performance.

== Bibliography ==
- Burling, William J. A Checklist of New Plays and Entertainments on the London Stage, 1700-1737. Fairleigh Dickinson Univ Press, 1992.
- Fisher, Tony. Theatre and Governance in Britain, 1500–1900. Cambridge University Press, 2017.
- Nicoll, Allardyce. A History of Early Eighteenth Century Drama: 1700-1750. CUP Archive, 1927.
