= The Generous Conqueror =

1701 play by Bevil Higgons

- Original language: English
- Written by: Bevil Higgons
- Genre: Tragedy

Premiere
- Date: December 1701
- Place: Theatre Royal, Drury Lane

The Generous Conqueror is a 1701 tragedy by the English writer Bevil Higgons. It was published in January the following year, and is sometimes dated 1702 by this. Higgons was a well-known Jacobite who had been implicated in the 1696 Jacobite assassination plot against William III. In this play he effectively called for the peaceful succession of the pretender to the throne as James III.

The Drury Lane cast included Robert Wilks as Almerick, John Mills as Rodomond, Philip Griffin as Gonzalvo, Colley Cibber as Malespine, Thomas Simpson as Meroan, Jane Rogers as Armida, Mary Kent as Irene and Anne Oldfield as Cimene. It was not a success, partly because audiences and critics objected to its Jacobite arguments portrayed in the characters and plot.

The prologue was by the Tory politician and writer George Granville, who shared the Jacobite sympathies of Higgons. The printed version play was dedicated to the Marquess of Normanby, who had attended the play several times, and was another Tory with Jacobite leanings.

A contemporary play Tamerlane by Nicholas Rowe, took the very opposite view to Higgons, presenting another historical tragedy that depicts William of Orange as a heroic figure in Whig eyes.

== Bibliography ==
- Braverman, Richard. Plots and Counterplots: Sexual Politics and the Body Politic in English Literature, 1660-1730. Cambridge University Press, 1993.
- Burling, William J. A Checklist of New Plays and Entertainments on the London Stage, 1700-1737. Fairleigh Dickinson Univ Press, 1992.
- Hone, Joseph. Literature and Party Politics at the Accession of Queen Anne. Oxford University Press, 2017.
- Lowerre, Kathryn. Music and Musicians on the London Stage, 1695-1705. Routledge, 2017.
