= Mary Davys =

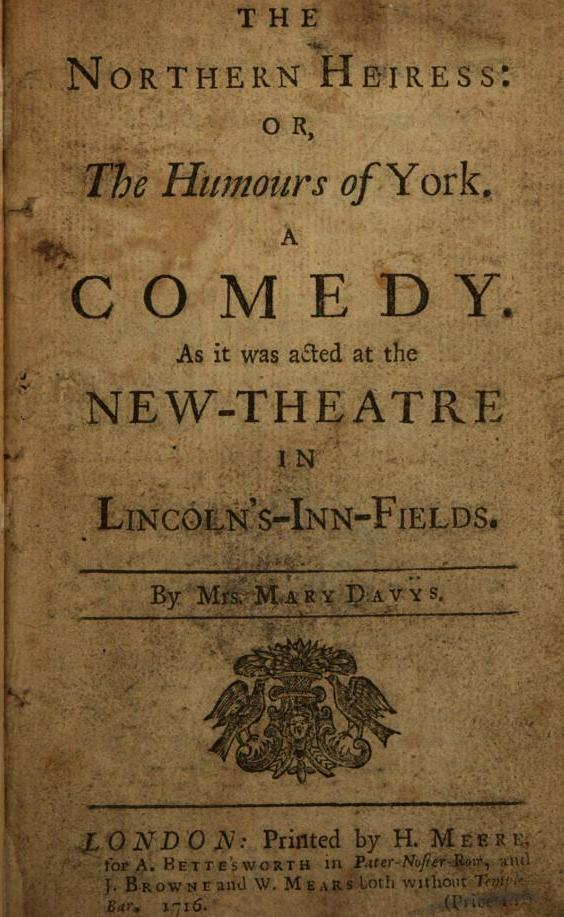
- Title page of Mary Davys' comedy The Northern Heiress, or, The Humours of York (1716)
- Born: 1674; Ireland
- Died: 1732 (aged 57–58)
- Resting place: Church of the Holy Sepulchre, Cambridge
- Occupation: writer
- Spouse: Peter Davys
- Writing career
- Language: English
- Years active: 1704—1727
- Notable work: The Reform'd Coquet (1724)

Mary Davys (1674?–1732) was an Irish novelist and playwright.

== Early life ==
Davys was born in Ireland: nothing is known about her childhood, including her birth name. Comments by Jonathan Swift, who was at Trinity College Dublin with her husband, suggest that she grew up in conditions of poverty and obscurity. She married Peter Davys, master of the free school of St Patrick's Cathedral, Dublin, and had two daughters both of whom seem to have died in infancy. Despite her lack of family connections, she had a number of socially prominent friends, including Margaret Walker, daughter of Sir John Jeffreyson, judge of the Court of Common Pleas (Ireland). After being widowed in 1698, she moved to London in 1700 in order to make a living.

== Writing career ==
She published The Amours of Alcippus and Lucippe, with a dedication to Margaret Walker, in 1704, and "The Fugitive," dedicated to Esther Johnson (Swift's "Stella"), in 1705. She claims in the Introduction to The Works of Mrs. Davys (1725) that she abandoned The Amours while in press to go north, probably to York. In 1716, she returned to London for the production of her play, The Northern Heiress, or the Humours of York, a comedy critical of the marriage market. Initially produced in York in 1715, it debuted in London at Lincoln's Inn Fields. The production ran for three nights, crucial for Davys as the receipts from the third night traditionally went to the playwright.

She spent some more time in London, hoping to have a successful writing career. In early 1718, Davys's novel Familiar Letters Betwixt a Gentleman and a Lady was printed by J. Roberts attributed to the pseudonym "Little Dick Fisher" and titled Love and Friendship Inseparable Betwixt Different Sexes, not appearing under her own name until it was published in The Works (1725). This textual variant ran to at least two editions, reprinted for H. Meere in 1722, as advertised in The London Journal. Despite this relative success, in about 1718 she abandoned the hope of staying in London. The note "As it was to be performed at the Drury Lane Theatre" on the title page of The Self-Rivals indicates possible disappointment. Instead, she moved to Cambridge, where she established a coffee house. Her chief patrons were the students at St. John's College, Cambridge, whom she thanks in her prefaces for their help.

In Cambridge, she turned to writing the novels for which she is best known. The Reform'd Coquet is a successful early example of the "novel of education", "the true paradigm of the central female tradition in the eighteenth-century novel [which] contains the key character type: 'the mistaken heroine who reforms' and learns to appreciate a worthy, if sober, man." Her Familiar Letters, which satirises the upper classes and their political affiliations, is an example of a successful epistolary novel before Samuel Richardson. Her writing is often direct, even blunt: for example, Sir John Galliard, the main character in The accomplish'd Rake, a debauched womanizer, is presented without euphemism. She was attacked in The Grub-Street Journal in 1731 for being "bawdy" but she "replied with vigour."

== Later life ==
Her response to a satirical letter in "The Grub Street Journal" refers to shaking hands and bad eyesight. She lived in Cambridge until her death after a period of ill health. She was buried in the Church of the Holy Sepulchre in Cambridge on 5 July 1732.

== Works ==
=== Collected works ===
- The works of Mrs. Davys: Consisting of, Plays, Novels, Poems, and Familiar Letters. Several of which never before publish'd. In two volumes. (London: H. Woodfall, 1725.)

=== Novels ===
- The amours of Alcippus and Lucippe. A novel. Written by A lady. (James Round, 1704; revised as The Lady's Tale for Works, 1725)
- The Fugitive (1705; revised as The Merry Wanderer for Works, 1725)
- The Reform'd Coquet, or, Memoirs of Amoranda (published by subscription, 1724. Included with revisions in Works. Went into seven editions by 1760.)
- Familiar letters betwixt a gentleman and lady (published in the Works of 1725; initially pseudonymously printed for J. Roberts as Love and Friendship in 1718)
- The accomplish'd rake, or, Modern fine gentleman (1727)
- The False Friend, or the Treacherous Portuguese (written c. 1704; published as The Cousins in Works, 1725)

=== Plays ===
- The Northern Heiress, or, The Humours of York (1716; debuted in 1715 at the Market House in York, and in London at Lincoln's Inn Fields in April 1716)
- The Self-Rival (unpublished until Works, 1725)

=== Poetry ===
- The Modern Poet (unpublished until Works, 1725)

== See also ==
- List of 18th-century British working-class writers
