= The Perfidious Brother =

1716 play

- Original language: English
- Written by: Lewis Theobald
- Genre: Tragedy

Premiere
- Date: 21 February 1716
- Place: Lincoln's Inn Fields Theatre

The Perfidious Brother is a 1716 tragedy by the British writer Lewis Theobald. A dispute rose of the authorship of the play when a watchmaker and aspiring playwright Henry Meystayer claimed that Theobald had stolen it from him. Meystayer published his own version of the play presenting it as the work of the "original author". Theobald was later to be involved in a much more controversial dispute in 1727 when he presented Double Falsehood as being based on a lost work of William Shakespeare.

The original Lincoln's Inn Fields cast included John Corey as Gonsalvo, Theophilus Keene as Sebastian, Thomas Smith as Roderick, John Leigh as Beaufort, Jane Rogers as Luciana and Jane Bullock as Selinda.

== Bibliography ==
- Burling, William J. A Checklist of New Plays and Entertainments on the London Stage, 1700-1737. Fairleigh Dickinson Univ Press, 1992.
- Carnegie, Davis & Taylor, Gary. The Quest for Cardenio: Shakespeare, Fletcher, Cervantes, and the Lost Play. OUP Oxford, 2012.
