= George Sewell (physician) =

English physician and poet

George Sewell (died 1726) was an English physician and poet, known as a controversialist and hack writer.

== Life ==
Born at Windsor, George Sewell was the eldest son of John Sewell, treasurer and chapter-clerk to the dean and canons of Windsor. He was educated at Eton College: his poem of The Favorite, a simile embodies reminiscences of his Eton life. He then went to Peterhouse, Cambridge, and graduated B.A. in 1709; for a time he studied medicine under Hermann Boerhaave at the University of Leiden, and about July 1725 he took the degree of M.D. at the University of Edinburgh.

Sewell practised at first in London, but little success. He then moved to Hampstead, but encountered competition from other physicians. Under financial pressure he became a booksellers' hack, publishing numerous poems, translations, and political and other pamphlets.

Sewell died of consumption at Hampstead, in poverty, on 8 February 1726. On 12 February he was given a pauper's funeral.

== Works ==
In early life Sewell inclined to Toryism, and was a bitter critic of Gilbert Burnet, whom he attacked in five pamphlets (1713–1715). His animosity extended to the bishop's son, Thomas Burnet (1694–1753), and he brought out anonymously in 1715 a satirical True Account of the Life and Writings of Thomas Burnet. Sewell also wrote in the Tory interest Remarks upon a Pamphlet intituled [Observations upon the State of the Nation] (anon.) 1713 (3rd edit., 1714); and Schism destructive of the Government: a Defense of the Bill for preventing the Growth of Schism; 2nd edit. 1714, in which he answered the arguments of Sir Richard Steele.

Afterwards Sewell attached himself to Sir Robert Walpole, and issued The Resigners vindicated: by a Gentleman, 1718. It went through four editions in that year, and was succeeded by The Resigners, Part ii. and last, 1718.

Sewell's best-known literary work was his Tragedy of Sir Walter Raleigh, as it is acted at the Theatre in Lincoln's Inn Fields, 1719; 5th edit. with a new scene (and prefatory verses from Amhurst and others), 1722; 6th edit. 1745. The author traded on the national hatred of Spain. James Quin played the part of the hero in this piece, which was produced on 16 January 1719, and was often repeated. It was revived for one night at Drury Lane, 14 December 1789.

Sewell contrived to link his name with those of many prominent writers of this period. Verses by him are in Matthew Prior's Collection of Poems, 1709. He twice defended Joseph Addison's Cato in pamphlets issued in 1713 and 1716. He wrote the preface for Addison's Miscellanies in Verse and Prose, 1725, which include two translations by him (the Puppet-show, and The Barometer, pp. 29–32). A copy of verses by him was added to Sir Richard Steele's Recantation.

Sewell had a principal part in the fifth volume of The Tatler, sometimes called "The spurious Tatler", which was edited by William Harrison, and in the ninth or "spurious" volume of The Spectator. He wrote a Life and Character of John Philips (2nd edit. 1715; 3rd edit. 1720), which was also issued with the works of Philips, and down to 1760 was often reprinted. To Alexander Pope's edition of Shakespeare (1725) Sewell added a seventh volume.

To George Cheyne's History of Himself (1743, pp. 44–49) was added Sewell's account of Archibald Pitcairne, of whose Dissertationes medicae Sewell issued a translation with John Theophilus Desaguliers in 1717. He assisted in the translation of Ovid's Metamorphoses (1717), which was projected in competition with that of Samuel Garth, even if Sewell addressed him as "his dear friend" in a poem in his New Collection (anon.), 1720. He contributed to, and probably supervised, a volume of Sacred Miscellanies (circa 1713), and he prepared in 1717 an edition of the Poems of Henry Howard, Earl of Surrey.

Others publications were:

- The Patriot: a Poem. Inscribed to Robert, Earl of Oxford, 1712; in his Posthumous Works (1728) the name of the representative patriot was changed (from Robert Harley) to Walpole.
- An Epistle from Sempronia to Cethegus, with Reply (anon.), 1713: a satire on the Duke and Duchess of Marlborough.
- The Proclamation of Cupid, or a Defence of Women: a Poem from Chaucer, 1718, reprinted in A new Collection.
- Poems on several Occasions, 1719.
- A new Collection of original Poems (anon.), 1720.

Posthumous were: Tragedy of King Richard I, Essays and Poems, 1728; edited by his brother, Gregory Sewell. Some of his poems are in John Nichols's Collection, and in Bell's Fugitive Poetry. Long letters to and from him are in the correspondence of John Dennis (1721), and in the works of Aaron Hill (1753). His own verses, prophetic of his death, are cited in Thomas Campbell's Specimens of the British Poets (1841, p. 345).
