= Lewis Theobald =

English writer

Lewis Theobald /ˈtɪbəld/ (baptised 2 April 1688 – 18 September 1744), English textual editor and author, was a landmark figure both in the history of Shakespearean editing and in literary satire. He was vital for the establishment of fair texts for Shakespeare, and he was the first avatar of Dulness in Alexander Pope's The Dunciad.

== Life and work ==
Lewis Theobald was the son of Peter Theobald, an attorney, and his second wife, Mary. He was born in Sittingbourne, Kent, and baptized there on 2 April 1688.

When Peter Theobald died in 1690, Lewis was taken into the Rockingham household and educated with the sons of the family, which gave him the grounding in Greek and Latin that would serve his scholarship throughout his career. As a young man, he was apprenticed to an attorney and then set up his own law practice in London. In 1707, possibly while he was apprenticing, he published A Pindaric Ode on the Union of Scotland and England and Naufragium Britannicum. In 1708 his tragedy The Persian Princess was performed at Drury Lane.

Theobald translated Plato's Phaedo in 1714 and was contracted by Bernard Lintot to translate the seven tragedies of Aeschylus but didn't deliver. In 1714, Theobald adapted Sophocles's Electra, and in 1715 he translated Ajax, and Oedipus Rex. Theobald also wrote for the Tory Mist's Journal. He attempted to make a living with drama and began to work with John Rich at Drury Lane, writing pantomimes for him including Harlequin Sorcerer (1725), Apollo and Daphne (1726), The Rape of Proserpine (1727), and Perseus and Andromeda (1730); many of these had music by Johann Ernst Galliard. He also probably plagiarized a man named Henry Meystayer. Meystayer had given Theobald a draft of a play called The Perfidious Brother to review, and Theobald had it produced as his own work.

Theobald's fame and contribution to English letters rests with his 1726 Shakespeare Restored, or a Specimen of the many Errors as well Committed as Unamended by Mr Pope in his late edition of this poet; designed not only to correct the said Edition, but to restore the true Reading of Shakespeare in all the Editions ever published. Theobald's variorum is, as its subtitle says, a reaction to Alexander Pope's edition of Shakespeare. Pope had "smoothed" Shakespeare's lines, and, most particularly, Pope had, indeed, missed many textual errors. In fact, when Pope produced a second edition of his Shakespeare in 1728, he incorporated many of Theobald's textual readings. Pope claimed that he took in only "about twenty-five words" of Theobald's corrections, but, in truth, he took in most of them. Additionally, Pope claimed that Theobald hid his information from Pope.

Pope was as much a better poet than Theobald as Theobald was a better editor than Pope, and the events surrounding Theobald's attack and Pope's counter-attack show both men at their heights. Theobald's Shakespeare Restored is a judicious, if ill-tempered, answer to Pope's edition, but in 1733 Theobald produced a rival edition of Shakespeare in seven volumes for Jacob Tonson, the book seller. For the edition, Theobald worked with Bishop Warburton, who later (1747) also published an edition of Shakespeare. Theobald's 1733 edition was far the best produced before 1750, and it has been the cornerstone of all subsequent editions. Theobald not only corrected variants but chose among best texts and undid many of the changes to the text that had been made by earlier 18th century editors. Edmond Malone's later edition (the standard from which modern editors act) was built on Theobald's.

== Theobald the Dunce ==
Theobald (pronounced by Pope as "Tibbald," though living members of his branch of the Theobald family say it was pronounced as spelled then, as it is today) was rewarded for his public rebuke of Pope by becoming the first hero of Pope's The Dunciad in 1728. In the Dunciad Variorum, Pope goes much farther. In the apparatus to the poem, he collects ill comments made on Theobald by others, gives evidence that Theobald wrote letters to Mist's Journal praising himself, and argues that Theobald had meant his Shakespeare Restored as an ambush. One of the damning bits of evidence came from John Dennis, who wrote of Theobald's Ovid: "There is a notorious Ideot . . . who from an under-spur-leather to the Law, is become an under-strapper to the Play-house, who has lately burlesqu'd the Metamorphoses of Ovid by a vile Translation" (Remarks on Pope's Homer p. 90). Until the second version of The Dunciad in 1741, Theobald remained the chief of the "Dunces" who led the way toward night (see the translatio stultitiae) by debasing public taste and bringing "Smithfield muses to the ears of kings." Pope attacks Theobald's plagiarism and work in vulgar drama directly, but the reason for the fury was in all likelihood the Shakespeare Restored. Even though Theobald's work is invaluable, Pope succeeded in so utterly obliterating the character of the man that he is known by those who do not work with Shakespeare only as a dunce, as a dusty, pedantic, and dull witted scribe. In this, "The Dunciad" affected Theobald's reputation for posterity much as Dryden's "Mac Flecknoe" affected Thomas Shadwell's.

== Double Falshood ==
In 1727, Theobald produced a play Double Falshood; or The Distrest Lovers, which he claimed to have based on a lost play by Shakespeare. Pope attacked it as a fraud, but admitted in private that he believed Theobald to have worked from, at the least, a genuine period work. Modern scholarship continues to be divided on the question of whether Theobald was truthful in his claim. Double Falshood may be based on the lost Cardenio, by Shakespeare and John Fletcher, which Theobald may have had access to in a surviving manuscript, which he revised for the tastes of the early eighteenth century. However, Theobald's claims about the origins of the play are not consistent and have not been uniformly accepted by critics.

== Selected plays ==
- The Persian Princess (1708)
- The Perfidious Brother (1716)
- Harlequin Sorcerer (1725)
- Apollo and Daphne (1726)
- Double Falsehood (1727)
- The Rape of Proserpine (1727)
- Orestes (1731)
- The Fatal Secret (1733)

== See also ==
- Shakespeare's editors
