= Newburgh Hamilton =

Irish author and librettist

Newburgh Hamilton (1691–1761) was an Ulster Scots writer and librettist.

He was born in County Tyrone, Ireland, on lands that had been gifted to his ancestors by James VI and I. He was a member of a plantation family with strong connections to the Stuart monarchy. He entered Trinity College, Dublin, in 1708, aged sixteen, but (as was common in those days) he left without obtaining a degree.

His satirical panegyric, The Changes: or, Faction Vanquish'd. A Poem. Most Humbly Incrib'd to those Noble Patriots, Defenders of their Country, and Supporters of the Crown, the Not Guilty Lords, was written in 1711, after the Tories' landslide General Election victory in the wake of the trial of the High Church clergyman Henry Sacheverell.

By 1712 Hamilton was in London, where he wrote two plays for the stage. The first, The Petticoat Plotter, premiered as a comedy afterpiece to Macbeth at the Theatre Royal, Drury Lane. His only full-length play, The Doating Lover; or, The Libertine Tam'd, opened at Lincoln's Inn Fields in 1715.

Hamilton was employed as steward to the diplomat and Jacobite conspirator Thomas Wentworth, 1st Earl of Strafford and his family, continuing to attend Anne, Lady Strafford after the Earl's death in 1739.

He is known to have been George Frederick Handel's librettist for three works: Alexander's Feast (1736), Samson (1743) and the Occasional Oratorio (1746). In writing the libretto for Handel's Samson (1743), he followed John Milton's Samson Agonistes rather than creating it from the story found in the Book of Judges. His comedy The Petticoat-Plotter was presented at the Theatre Royal, Drury Lane on 5 June 1712 and The Doating Lovers was premièred at Lincoln's Inn Fields Theatre on 23 June 1715.

His work is discussed in Terence Tobin, Plays by Scots 1660-1800 (University of Iowa Press, 1974) and by Adrienne Scullion in Bill Findlay, A History of Scottish Theatre (Edinburgh: Polygon, 1998)

== See also ==
- Alexander's Feast (Dryden)
