= Charles Beckingham =

English poet and dramatist (1699–1730/1731)

- Born: 25 July 1699
- Died: 19 February 1730/1731
- Education: Merchant Taylors' School
- Occupations: English poet and dramatist

Charles Beckingham (25 July 1699 – 19 February 1730/1731) was an English poet and dramatist.

== Life ==
Beckingham was born, according to the register of Merchant Taylors' School, on 25 July 1699 (Robinson's Register, ii. 32). His father was a linen draper in Fleet Street. Beckingham was educated at Merchant Taylors' School under Dr. Smith, and is said to have displayed "great proficiency in his studies", and given "the strongest testimonials of extraordinary abilities". On 18 February 1718 Scipio Africanus, a historical tragedy in the regulation five acts, was produced at the theatre in Lincoln's Inn Fields. This was followed at the same house on 7 November of the next year by a second work of a similar description, entitled Henry IV of France. The youth of the author, and the presence of a large number of his fellow-students who had been permitted to visit the theatre, gave some éclat to the production of the earlier work. A chief subject of praise in contemporary writers is the manner in which the so-called unities are observed by its author. The plot is founded on a story told by Livy and other classical writers concerning the restoration of a beautiful captive by Scipio Africanus to her betrothed, the Spanish prince Allucius. A considerable portion of the play consists of tedious love scenes, which are necessarily fictitious, and the hero was played by James Quin. Scipio Africanus was acted four times in all, two performances being, it is stated, for the author's benefit. It was printed in duodecimo in 1718. In 1728, Beckingham's poem "Sarah the Quaker to Lothario" was published. It is about a perjured lover confronting the man who left her when they are both in the afterlife. Henry IV of France deals with the jealousy of the Prince of Condé of his wife, who is in love with the king, and ends with the murder of Henry by Ravaillac at the instigation of the papal nuncio and the priests. This play was also given four times, Quin appearing as Henry IV. It was printed in octavo in 1820. In addition to these dramas Beckingham wrote a poem on the death of Rowe, the dramatist; a second entitled Christ's Sufferings, translated from the Latin of Rapin, and dedicated to the Archbishop of York; and other minor poems. He died 19 February 1730-31. (Note: Jacob's Poetical Register) (Note: Baker, Reed, and Jones's Biographia Dramatica) (Note: Genest's Account of the English Stage.)
