= Christopher Bullock (actor) =

English actor and playwright

Christopher Bullock (1690 – 5 April 1722) was an English actor and playwright.

Bullock was the son of the actor William Bullock, and during his early years on the stage was often billed as Young Bullock to distinguish him from his father. He likely made his stage debut in a performance of The Recruiting Officer at the Queen's Theatre in Haymarket, London in 1707. Over the following decade and a half he also appeared frequently at Drury Lane and the Lincoln's Inn Fields Theatre, and was considered a potential natural successor to Colley Cibber in fop roles. In 1717 he and Theophilus Keene took over the management of Lincoln's Inn from John Rich for a period.

Bullock married the actress Jane Rogers in 1717, with whom he had three children. Between 1715 and 1718 he also authored several plays, mainly farces, beginning with an afterpiece The Slip. His sole attempt at a tragedy was The Traitor. In 1720 he relinquished his management role at Lincoln's Inn but continued to act there. Increasingly in ill health from consumption he made his final appearance in a revival of Thomas Otway's The Soldier's Fortune on 9 January 1722 appearing alongside his wife and father in the cast. He died several months later on 5 April and was buried in Hampstead.

== Selected roles ==
- Appletree in The Recruiting Officer (1707)
- Whisper in The Busie Body (1709)
- Chevalier in The City Ramble (1711)
- Hazard in The Wife's Relief (1711)
- Sergeant Dolt in The Successful Pyrate (1712)
- Merit in The Wife of Bath (1713)
- Euribartes in The Victim (1714)
- Fondlewife in The Old Bachelor (1715)
- Sir Timothy Twiddle in The Doating Lovers (1715)
- Vizard in A Woman's Revenge (1715)
- Welby in The Northern Heiress (1716)
- Snuffle in The Cobbler of Preston (1716)
- Sir Amorous Vainwit in Woman Is a Riddle (1716)
- Le Bronze in The Coquet (1718)
- Colonel Fainwell in A Bold Stroke for a Wife (1718)
- Cosmo in The Traitor (1718)
- Bardach in Kensington Gardens (1719)
- Nuncio in Henry IV of France (1719)
- Gundamor in Sir Walter Raleigh (1719)
- Meagre in The Half-Pay Officers (1720)
- Ned Indolent in Whig and Tory (1720)
- Sir Davy in The Soldier's Fortune (1722)

== Bibliography ==
- Highfill, Philip H, Burnim, Kalman A. & Langhans, Edward A. A Biographical Dictionary of Actors, Actresses, Musicians, Dancers, Managers, and Other Stage Personnel in London, 1660-1800: Garrick to Gyngell. SIU Press, 1978.
