= Bevil Higgons =

English historian and poet

Bevil Higgons (1670–1735) was an English historian and poet.

== Life ==
Higgons was born at Kezo, the third son of Sir Thomas Higgons, by his second wife, Bridget, who was herself the daughter of Sir Bevil Grenville, and widow of Sir Simon Leach of Cadleigh, Devon. In Lent term 1686, when aged 16, Higgons matriculated as a commoner at St John's College, Oxford, but shortly migrated to Trinity Hall, Cambridge.

On leaving university Higgons entered the Middle Temple. His family were Jacobites, and his uncle Denis Grenville had accompanied James II to France. Higgons spent some years in exile along with his brother Thomas Higgons. After he was allowed to return to England, he and his two brothers were suspected in 1695 of knowledge of the conspiracy against the life of William III; Bevil was said to have dissuaded his brother Thomas from joining it. A proclamation for the arrest of George Higgons and his two brothers was issued by William on 23 February 1696. Their detention did not last long.

The rest of Higgons's life was spent as a writer. He died on 1 March 1735. He was buried in Old St. Pancras Churchyard on 6 March 1735. The grave is lost and his name is not listed on the Burdett-Coutts Memorial to important graves lost therein.

== Works ==
The main works of Higgons were historical, the major one being A Short View of the English History; with Reflections on the Reigns of the Kings, their Characters and Manners, their Succession to the Throne; and all other remarkable incidents, to the Revolution, 1688 (1723). Another edition was issued at the Hague in 1727, an edition with additions appeared in London in 1734, and a third edition in 1748, each of the last two having a dedication to the Duchess of Buckingham and Normanby. A translation into French was also published at the Hague in 1729. A related Historical and Critical Remarks on Bishop Burnet's History of his own Time was published by Higgons in 1725, and reached a second edition in 1727. Both were reissued in 1736, as his Historical Works. History of the Life and Reign of Mary Queen of Scots and Dowager of France (Dublin, 1753) claimed to be by Higgons.

Higgons wrote verses for the 1688 Cambridge University collection Illustrissimi principis ducis Cornubiæ genethliacon, addressed to Mary of Modena, on the birth of her son James Francis Edward Stuart. In Examen Poeticum, being the Third Part of Dryden's Miscellany, 1693, were poems by Higgons, and he prefixed lines to William Congreve's Old Bachelor. He wrote a Jacobite tragedy The Generous Conqueror, or the Timely Discovery (1702) which opened well but was found partisan, according to Charles Gildon. The prologue was by his relation George Granville, Lord Lansdowne and Higgons in turn composed the epilogue for Granville's Heroick Love, and the prologue for his Jew of Venice He is said to have contributed to a collection by Elijah Fenton of Poems on Several Occasions (1717), and his panegyric in verse of the Glorious Peace of Utrecht came out in 1731. Most of his pieces were reprinted in the collection of John Nichols.

== Notes ==
Attribution

This article incorporates text from a publication now in the public domain: Stephen, Leslie; Lee, Sidney, eds. (1891). "Higgons, Bevil". Dictionary of National Biography. Vol. 26. London: Smith, Elder & Co.
