= London (Samuel Johnson poem) =

Poem by Samuel Johnson

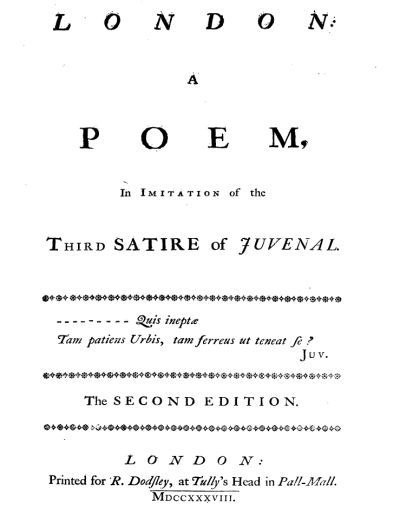
Title page of London (1738) second edition

London is a poem by Samuel Johnson, produced shortly after he moved to London. Written in 1738, it was his first major published work. The poem in 263 lines imitates Juvenal's Third Satire, expressed by the character of Thales as he decides to leave London for Wales. Johnson imitated Juvenal because of his fondness for the Roman poet and he was following a popular 18th-century trend of Augustan poets headed by Alexander Pope that favoured imitations of classical poets, especially for young poets in their first ventures into published verse.

London was published anonymously and in multiple editions during 1738. It quickly received critical praise, notably from Pope. This would be the second time that Pope praised one of Johnson's poems; the first being for Messiah, Johnson's Latin translation of Pope's poem. Part of that praise comes from the political basis of the poem. From a modern view, the poem is outshone by Johnson's later poem The Vanity of Human Wishes, as well as works like his A Dictionary of the English Language, his Lives of the Most Eminent English Poets, and his periodical essays for The Rambler, The Idler and The Adventurer.

== Background ==
During March 1737, Johnson lived in London with his former pupil the actor David Garrick. Garrick had connections in London, and the two stayed with his distant relative, Richard Norris, who lived in Exeter Street. Johnson did not stay there long, and set out to Greenwich near the Golden Hart Tavern to finish his play, Irene. Later, in October 1737, Johnson brought his wife to London; they first lived at Woodstock Street and then moved to 6 Castle Street. Soon, Johnson found employment with Edward Cave, and wrote for his The Gentleman's Magazine.

According to Walter Jackson Bate, his work for the magazine and other publishers "is almost unparalleled in range and variety", and "so numerous, so varied and scattered" that "Johnson himself could not make a complete list". During this time, Johnson was exposed to the "imitations" of Horace composed by Pope and saw how they were used to attack contemporary political corruption. Both the form and subject were popular, and Johnson decided to follow Pope's lead by creating his own imitation.

In May 1738, London was published anonymously, and it went into a second edition that year. This was his first major work to be published to a wide audience and one of his longest "non-dramatic public poems". It was not written to be a general satire; instead, it was written to demonstrate Johnson's skill as a writer and to become popular to further his literary career.

== London ==
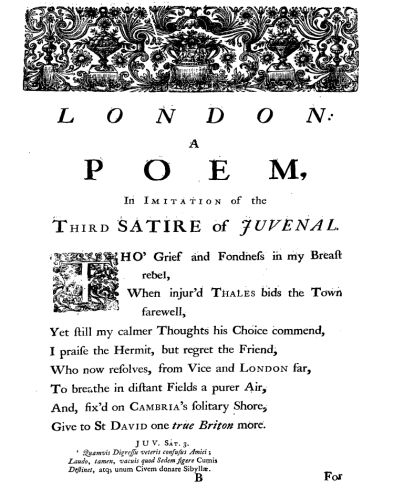
First page of London (1738)

London is part of the eighteenth-century genre of imitation, or Neoclassicism. The work was based on Juvenal's Third Satire which describes Umbricius leaving Rome to live in Cumae in order to escape from the vices and dangers of the capital city. In Johnson's version, it is Thales who travels to Cambria (Wales) to escape from the problems of London. Johnson chose Juvenal as a model based on his own appreciation for Juvenal's works. The epigraph from Juvenal, "Quis ineptae [iniquae] / Tam patiens urbis, tam ferreus ut teneat se?” (Juv. 1.30-1) can be translated as "Who is so patient of the foolish [wicked] city, so iron-willed, as to contain himself?”.

The poem describes the various problems of London, including an emphasis on crime, corruption, and the squalor of the poor. To emphasise his message, these various abstract problems are personified as beings that seek to destroy London. Thus, the characters of Malice, Rapine, and Accident "conspire" (line 13) to attack those who live in London.

The poem begins:

Though grief and fondness in my breast rebel,
When injur'd Thales bids the town farewell,
Yet still my calmer thoughts his choice commend,
(I praise the hermit, but regret the friend)
Resolv'd at length, from vice and London far,
To breathe in distant fields a purer air,
And, fix'd on Cambria's solitary shore,
Give to St. David one true Briton more.

— lines 1–8

Who Thales represents is unknown, but it is possible that he represents Richard Savage, Johnson's friend who left London to travel to Wales.

The main emphasis of the poem comes to light on line 177: "Slow rises worth, by poverty depressed".

The poem is forced to cut short, and the narrator concludes:

Much could I add, but see the boat at hand,
The tide retiring calls me from the land:
Farewell!—When youth, and health, and fortune spent
Thou fly'st for refuge to the Wilds of Kent;
And tir'd like me with follies and with crimes,
In angry numbers warn'st succeeding times;
Then shall thy friend, nor thou refuse his aid,
Still foe to vice, forsake his Cambrian shade;
In virtue's cause once more exert his rage,
Thy satire point, and animate thy page.

— lines 254–263

=== Politics ===
The government under the Whig Sir Robert Walpole opposed to the content expressed in "London." The poem does not hide its political agenda, and the lines directed against George II follow a Jacobite political sentiment. Although it does not mention George in line 50 ("Let ____ live here, for ____ has learned to live"), the poem is referring to the king. Not until the end of the poem does the narrator directly address the government when he says:

Propose your schemes, ye senatorian band,
Whose ways and means support the sinking land:
Lest ropes be wanting in the tempting spring,
To rig another convoy for the king.

— lines 244–247

It is through the "Ways and Means", or the Committee of Ways and Means of the House of Commons, that the king is able to tax the people, and this function is part of many that Johnson satirises.

The city of London was seen as a means to attack the Whig political party run by Robert Walpole. In particular, Johnson compares the actions of George II and Walpole to those of the Roman emperors during the decline of the Roman Empire. Part of the attack included, as Brean Hammond puts it, "a nostalgic glorification of English history that went hand-in-hand with the representation of the present as in the grip of forms of corruption never previously encountered". This "nostalgic glorification" includes multiple references to Queen Elizabeth and her defeat of the Spanish invaders while simultaneously claiming that Walpole is seeking to allow Spain to conquer England's trade investments.

With England's rivalry with Spain, Johnson included the lines "Has heaven reserved, in pity to the poor,/No pathless waste or undiscovered shore,/No secret island in the boundless main,/No peaceful desert yet unclaimed by Spain?" Modern Latin American historians have used the lines to illustrate Europeans' wonder at the sheer size of the Spanish Empire.

== Critical response ==
Johnson judged his own poem harshly; he revised it in 1748 and came to deprecate the genre of poetic imitations of which London was an example. Another aspect of the poem that Johnson disliked in his later years was the pastoral bias of the poem, to prefer the countryside to the city. However, his contemporaries did not agree with his later assessment, and Alexander Pope from the first claimed that the author "will soon be déterré", although it did not immediately happen. This would be the second time that Pope directly praised a work of Johnson. Not everyone praised the work, as its political themes did cause controversy within the Hanoverian government and with the supporters of Walpole's administration. Johnson was not to receive recognition as a major literary figure until a few years later when he began to work on his A Dictionary of the English Language.

The printer and bookseller Robert Dodsley bought the copyright from Johnson for £10. Later, London would be rated as his second greatest poem, as The Vanity of Human Wishes would replace it in the eyes of Walter Scott and T. S. Eliot. The later critic Howard Weinbrot agreed with Scott's and Eliot's assessment, and says "London is well worth reading, but The Vanity of Human Wishes is one of the great poems in the English language." Likewise, Robert Folkenflik says: "It is not Johnson's greatest poem, only because The Vanity of Human Wishes is better". Some critics, like Brean Hammond, only see the poem as "no better than a somewhat mechanical updating of Juvenal's third Satire". Others, like Walter Jackson Bate, consider the poem as "masterly in its versification".
