= Messiah (English poem) =

1712 poem by Alexander Pope

Messiah is a 'sacred eclogue' by Alexander Pope, composed in 1712. It is based on the Fourth Eclogue of Virgil, and is an example of English Classicism's appropriation and reworking of the genres, subject matter and techniques of classical Latin literature.

Samuel Johnson, while still a student at Oxford, translated Pope's Messiah into Latin hexameters. The translation appeared in Miscellany of Poems (1731), edited by John Husbands, and is the earliest surviving publication of any of Johnson's writings.

== Sources ==
- Bate, Walter Jackson (1977), Samuel Johnson, New York: Harcourt Brace Jovanovich, ISBN 0-15-179260-7.
