= Messiah (Latin poem) =

Messiah (1712) is a poem by Alexander Pope which Samuel Johnson translated into Latin in December 1728. This was the first poem of Johnson's to be published, and consists of 119 lines written in Latin verse. The whole translation was completed in two days and was submitted to Pope for appraisal.

== Background ==
In 1728, Johnson was admitted into Pembroke College, Oxford, and William Jorden was made his tutor. During his first weeks, Johnson was assigned various poem topics to write on, which he refused to complete. However, he did complete one poem, the first of his tutorial exercises, on which he spent comparably significant time (that of two rereads), and which provoked surprise and applause. Jorden, impressed with Johnson's skill at Latin verse, asked his student to produce a Latin translation of Pope's Messiah as a Christmas exercise. Johnson completed half of the translation in one afternoon and the rest the following morning. The poem was finished quickly because Johnson was hoping for patronage that would help him overcome the financial difficulties that he was experiencing while at Pembroke.

After Johnson finished the poem, it was sent to his home, and his father Michael Johnson, a bookseller, immediately printed the work. It was later included in a collection of work by the Pembroke tutor John Husbands titled Miscellany of Poems (1731).

== Messiah ==
Pope's Messiah deals with Virgil's Fourth Eclogue which was said to predict the birth of Christ. The poem merges the prophecy of Isaiah about the Messiah with wording that echoes Virgil. Johnson's translation into Latin relies on Virgil directly and incorporates more of the Eclogue's language.

== Critical response ==
The work was immediately favoured among students of Oxford and Husbands's Miscellany of Poems (1731) contained a list of subscribers including half of the enrolled students at Pembroke. Although the poem brought him praise, it did not bring him the material benefit he had hoped for. The poem was brought to Pope's attention by Charles Arbuthnot, the son of Pope's friend John Arbuthnot; according to Sir John Hawkins, Pope praised the work when he claimed that he could not tell if it was "the original" or not.

However, John Taylor, his friend, dismissed this incident as "praise" by claiming that "Pope said it was very finely done, but that he had seen it before, and said nothing more either of it or its Authour." Instead of Johnson being the first to send Pope a copy, Johnson's father had already published the translation before Johnson sent a copy to Pope, and Pope could have been remarking about it being a duplication of the published edition that he earlier read. This possibility is reinforced by Johnson becoming "very angry" towards his father. Johnson told Taylor, "if it had not been his Father [who had done this] he would have cut his throat," even though Pope did praise the poem even if it may not have been during the second time Pope saw the work. Regardless, Johnson "had gained great applause" for the poem.

20th-century criticism focused on the poem as a model of Johnson's ability to write; Walter Jackson Bate praised the work and called it a "major effort".
