= Satires (Juvenal) =

Collection of satirical poems by Juvenal

- by Decimus Junius Juvenalis
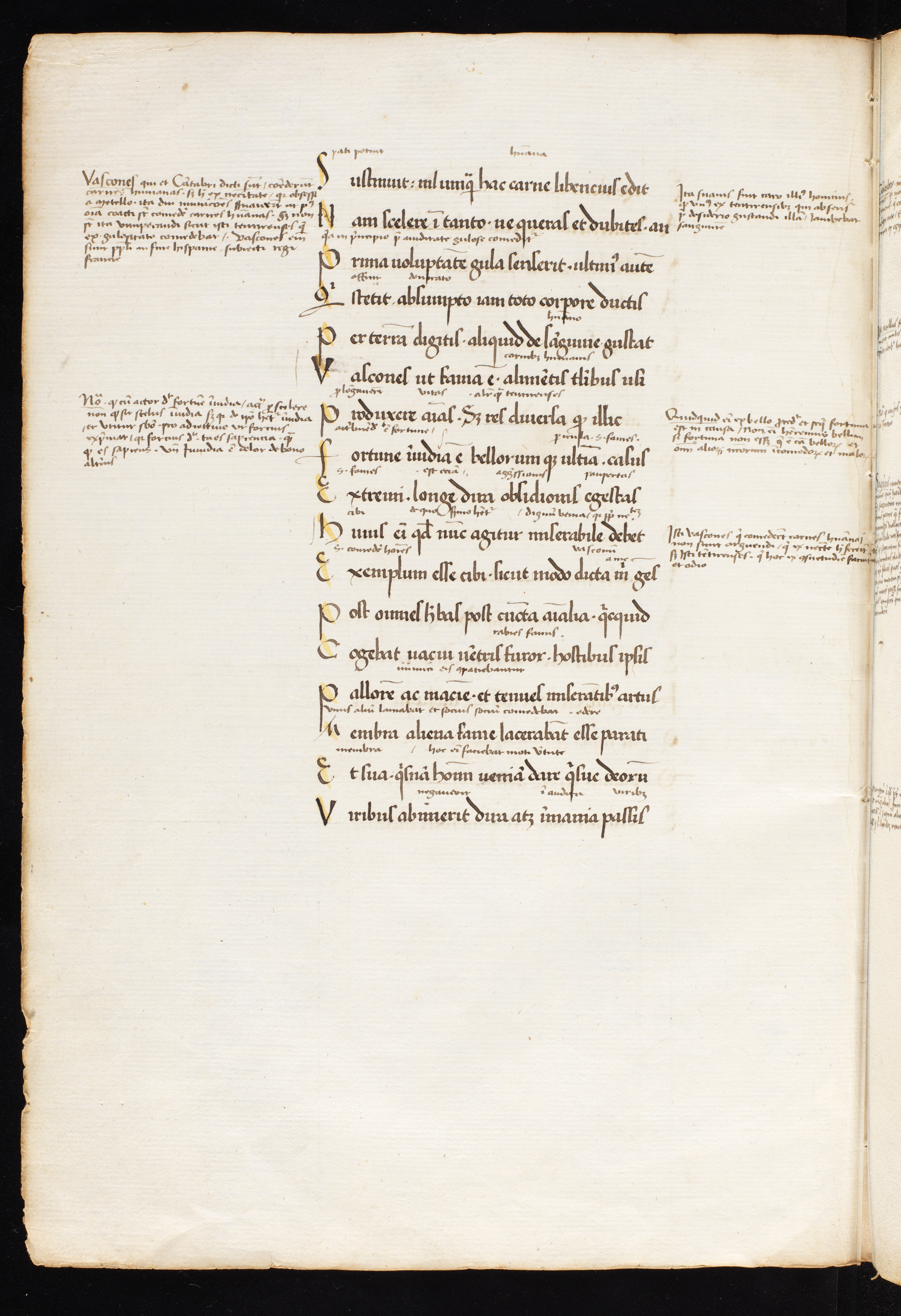
- Page from a medieval manuscript, with Satire 15 and annotations
- Original title: Saturae
- Translator: John Dryden (1692); G. G. Ramsay (1918); Rolfe Humphries (1958); Peter Green (1967); Niall Rudd (1991)
- Written: c. AD 100–127
- Country: Roman Empire
- Language: Latin
- Genre: Satire
- Form: 16 poems divided into five books
- Meter: dactylic hexameter
- Publication date: 1467
- Published in English: 1647
- Media type: manuscript

Full text
- The Satires of Juvenal at Wikisource

The Satires (Latin: Saturae) are a collection of satirical poems by the Latin author Juvenal written between 100–127 A.D.

The Satires address perceived threats to society, such as socially ascendant foreigners, infidelity, and the extreme excesses of the Roman aristocracy. Juvenal's audience was highly educated, and his dense poems are laced with historical and mythological allusions.

== History and composition ==
=== Date ===
The first book of Satires probably dates to 100 AD. The fifth book likely dates to a point after 127, because of a reference to the Roman consul Lucius Aemilius Juncus in Satire 15. Between these two books, Juvenal wrote seven additional satires that are organized in three books. Satire 6 was written shortly after the first book and serves as a companion piece.

=== Genre ===
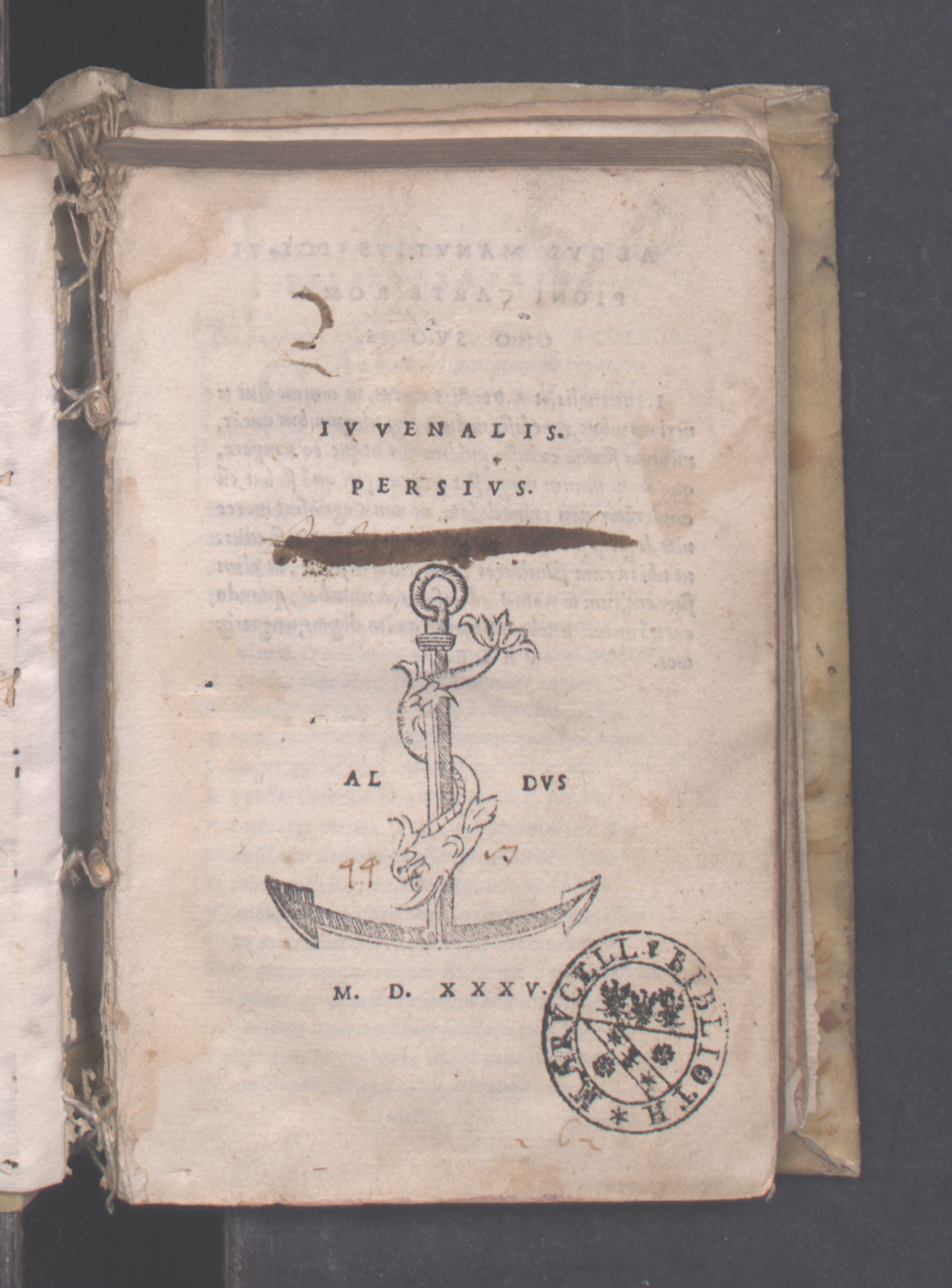
Frontispiece of Aldo Manuzio's 1501 printing of Juvenal's Satires.

The Roman satire genre featured a wide-ranging discussion of social mores in dactylic hexameter. Quintilian noted how many genres Rome borrowed from Greece but concluded, "Satire, on the other hand, is all our own". The other great satirist of Rome was Horace. John Dryden summed up the difference in their approach, "Horace meant to make his reader laugh...Juvenal always intends to move your indignation."

In Satire 1, concerning the scope and content of his work, Juvenal says:

"From the day when the rain-clouds lifted up the waters, and Deucalion climbed that mountain in his ship to seek an oracle—that day when stones grew soft and warm with life, and Pyrrha showed maidens in nature's garb to men—all the doings of mankind, their vows, their fears, their angers and their pleasures, their joys and goings to and fro, shall form the motley subject of my page." - (1.81–86)

Juvenal's Satires range from 130 to 695 lines. Satire 16 is incomplete. Translators like Niall Rudd sometimes provided pithy titles like "9. The Woes of a Gigolo" and "15. The Case of Cannibalism". The 16 Satires are grouped into five books:

- Book I: Satires 1–5
- Book II: Satire 6
- Book III: Satires 7–9
- Book IV: Satires 10–12
- Book V: Satires 13–16

== Synopsis ==
=== Book I ===
Satire 1: Juvenal begins, "semper ego auditor tantum..." (Must I be always a listener?). He confesses the moral rot of Rome has made avoiding satire impossible. He points to eunuch marriages, women at boar hunts, and sycophancy as examples of widespread degeneracy. He praises Gaius Lucilius for proving the merits of the genre.

Satire 2: Juvenal attacks hypocrites and homosexuality. He also defames Otho for bringing cosmetics on a military campaign. He claims the ghosts of great Romans would feel ill upon seeing such men in the Underworld.

Satire 3: The third satire describes the decision of Umbricius, Juvenal's friend, to depart from Rome. Narrated by Umbricius, it states that an honest man cannot survive in Rome and complains about how it is impossible to compete with Greeks and Orientals. Within this satire, Juvenal calls Rome "a chaotic metropolis where life has become dangerous for honest men".

Satire 4: The fourth satire is a mock-heroic epic, describing a council convened by Domitian. Starting off with an invocation to the muse of epic poetry, Calliope, it mocks the absurdity of the situation with a fake sense of importance. Within it, Juvenal is summoned to the council to determine how to cook the gigantic turbot (rhombus) given to Domitian as a gift. It also discusses various other events, such as Crispinus buying a singular mullet at the outrageous price of 6,000 sesterces.

Satire 5: The fifth satire describes the shame experienced by a client when his patron, Virro, finally decided to extend to him an invitation to his dinner party. It criticizes the client, stating that "a poor man's stomach is easy to please, yet you suffer insults at a dinner party just for a free meal". It also states that, though they are at the same table, they are being treated completely differently, with the client being given much worse food while Virro eats delicacies. Overall, this satire is a brutal commentary on the social inequality of ancient Rome, where the wealthy give their dependents the bare minimum in exchange for their loyalty.

=== Book II ===
Satire 6: The sixth satire is Juvenal's longest, at 661 lines, and his most famous. Addressing a man whom Juvenal calls delusional enough to think about getting married, he expounds the immorality and "vices" of women. In it, he claims that women are unfaithful, and that they relentlessly seek abortions, murder their stepchildren, and use potions to drive their husbands insane. Thus he proposes suicide as a "painless alternative" to marriage. Two noteworthy phrases from this satire are "rara avis" (lit. "rare bird"), which refers to good women as a black swan, or hard to come by, and another is the line "quis custodiet ipsos custodes" (lit. "who will guard the guards themselves").

=== Book III ===
Satire 7: The seventh satire laments the decline of intellectual pursuits and the miserable circumstances of contemporary authors, pining for the patronage enjoyed by Augustan writers. It opens with a prayer for better treatment of scholars under a new emperor, possibly Hadrian. The satire criticizes how learned men are underpaid while public entertainers, like the actor Paris, are excessively compensated. This actor, Paris, may have been the man that he was possibly exiled for slandering.

Satire 8: The eighth satire takes issue with the idea that noble birth defines a person's worth, stating that true nobility comes from virtue, not their pedigree. Juvenal argues that relying on the achievements of one's ancestors is meaningless if the individual is inferior to them. He points out that many nobles do nothing to earn their status, contrasting it with racehorses valued for their speed rather than their lineage—if they are slow, they are sent to pull carts. Thus, Juvenal implies that if a noble is inferior, he should be regarded as so, as well. Furthermore, he criticizes Nero, stating that he utterly debased himself in spending lavishly on sports.

Satire 9: The ninth satire is a conversation between the narrator and Naevolus, a male prostitute who is upset that his hard work isn't paying off. Naevolus talks about serving rich, effeminate men who do not want to spend money on his services. Naevolus also talks about how he saved one man's marriage, but now the man wants someone else. To which, the narrator tells him that rich men have no secrets and that he will always find a patron, and Naevolus worries about growing older and losing his appeal.

=== Book IV ===
Satire 10: The tenth satire focuses on the foolishness of human desires, showing how things like wealth, power, beauty, long life, and even children, are not truly good in themselves. Juvenal argues that these desires can often lead to harm. For example, wealth can destroy, power is fleeting, and even fame or military glory can bring ruin. Juvenal highlights examples like Sejanus, Hannibal, and Alexander the Great to show how these worldly pursuits end in disappointment, even if they were less of a disappointment than him. The satire ends by suggesting that instead of seeking these things, people should trust the gods to choose what’s best for them. The famous phrase "mens sana in corpore sano" (lit. a healthy mind in a healthy body) is found within this satire.

Satire 11: The eleventh satire focuses on moderation, mainly in food and the Roman cena (formal dinner). Juvenal contrasts the lavish spending habits of gourmands with the simplicity and moderation of a meal made from home-grown foods. In the first section, he criticizes those who refuse to spend less on luxuries, even at the cost of going into debt, and urges the wisdom of Apollo's advice to "know thyself", not just in aspirations, but in what one spends on food. The narrator then invites a friend, Persicus, to his house to demonstrate his own moderation, serving only simple foods from his Tiburtine land. He talks about how ancient Romans, like the noble Curius, were content with humble food, while modern wealthy people demand luxuries like ivory tables and professional meat carvers. Instead of a pornographic Spanish dance show, Juvenal says the evening's entertainment after the dinner will be poetry.

Satire 12: The twelfth satire features a narrator describing to Corvinus the vows he made to the Roman gods—Jupiter, Juno, and Minerva—along with his Lares (family gods) to ensure the safety of his friend Catullus during a dangerous storm at sea. Despite the threat of the storm, which led Catullus to sacrifice valuable possessions for his life, the narrator says that his sacrifices are not for personal gain—unlike the legacy hunters who might sacrifice anything, including slaves or children, to secure an inheritance. After the storm, the sailors managed to reach the port at Ostia, and the narrator prepares an altar to make his offerings. The narrator clarifies that since Catullus has heirs, his actions in helping Catullus are motivated by friendship, not by a desire for wealth.

=== Book V ===
Satire 13: The thirteenth satire is a reflection on the dangers of revenge when one is wronged. The narrator begins by stating that guilt is its own punishment and he suggests that experience can help defend against the whims of Fortuna. He also acknowledges that the world is corrupt and that the Golden Age was vastly superior to the present (a point he brought up in Satire 7 as well). Juvenal also points out that financial loss is often mourned more than death itself and he criticizes people that are surprised by the scale of crime in Rome, likening it to being surprised by a German with blue eyes. He also calls revenge foolish, citing philosophers like Chrysippos, Thales, and Socrates, who would not endorse such actions. He also references a story from Herodotus about a corrupt Spartan consulting the Oracle at Delphi, stating that merely intending to do evil makes one immediately guilty.

Satire 14: The fourteenth satire says that children learn vice from their parents, stressing the injustice of a father punishing a son for imitating his own faults. Juvenal says that people are more concerned with presenting a clean atrium to guests than with maintaining a virtuous household for their children, and gives various examples, such as Caetronius and his son both squandering wealth on extravagant houses, and stating that religious customs, like Judaism, are learned from one's parents. Juvenal claims that avaricious individuals risk their lives for these unimportant gains, for example, how Alexander the Great's realization that Diogenes, content with little, was happier than he. Ultimately, the satire says that truly being content lies in possessing as much as Epicurus or Socrates found sufficient, or, in Roman terms, a modest fortune within the equestrian order; if such wealth does not satisfy, then Juvenal states that not even the riches of Croesus or Persia will be enough.

Satire 15: The fifteenth satire talks about the importance of compassion in maintaining civilization. Juvenal states that while extreme circumstances have sometimes forced people into desperate actions for survival, even the most savage societies have historically refrained from cannibalism. He recounts a recent incident in Upper Egypt where two rival cities, consumed by hatred, escalated a minor conflict into full-blown violence, leading to the horrific act of eating a fallen enemy raw. In contrast, Juvenal says that the Vascones, besieged by Pompey, resorted to cannibalism only out of necessity, and even the infamous human sacrifices at the altar of Artemis in Taurus did not involve consumption of flesh. At the end, Juvenal says that compassion is what makes humans and animals different, along with our ability to cry, as people are endowed not only with life but also with reason, enabling them to build civilization.

Satire 16: The sixteenth satire discusses the advantages that soldiers enjoy over ordinary citizens. Juvenal says that soldiers are immune to civilian justice, as any legal action against them must take place within the camp, where a plaintiff stands little chance and may even face violence for their efforts. Unlike civilians, soldiers are not subjected to the delays of the legal system and possess the right to make a will while their father is still alive–an inversion of the usual family hierarchy that places the son, a soldier, above his own father. This satire, although left incomplete due to only 60 lines being preserved, showed Juvenal's expertise in law and adds credit to him possibly working in the legal system prior to writing his Satires.

== Scholarship ==
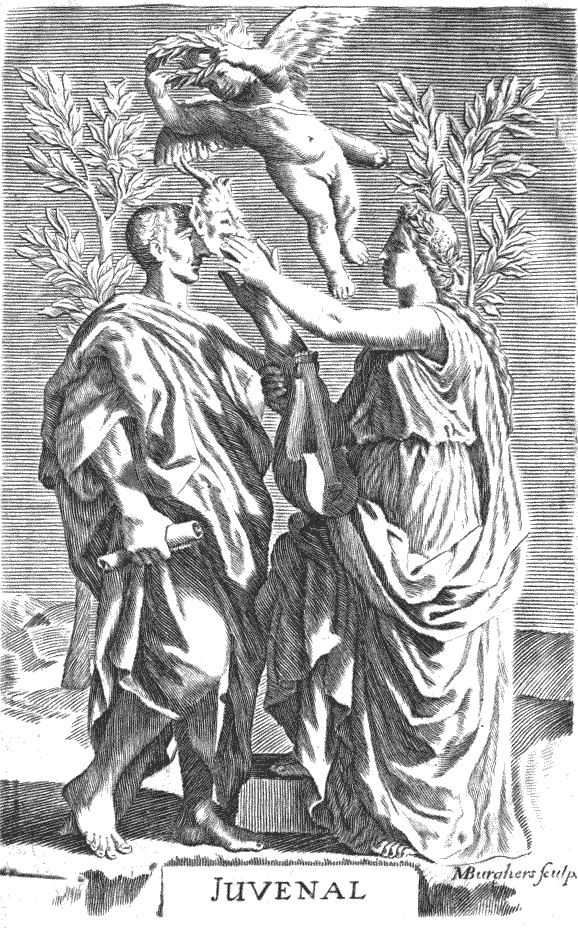
Frontispiece depicting Juvenal and Persius, from a 1711 edition of John Dryden's translation.

The chief manuscript for Juvenal's Satires is a codex edited by Pierre Pithou in 1575. It made its way to Montpellier. The manuscript is known as the Codex Pithoeanus Montepessulanus. A. E. Housman developed a critical apparatus for the Satires in 1905.

Lacunae in manuscripts created problems that editors and translators solved in a variety of ways. In addition to lacunae, it was common to expurgate Juvenal's explicit passages until recently.

John Dryden wrote a massive introduction for his translation of Satires in 1692.

Juvenal's persona in the first two books is indignant, persistently asking outraged questions about the state of Rome. In the later books, he is more restrained and ironic. He borrowed heavily from writers like Martial and Virgil.

Juvenal's Satires are a valuable source about early Judaism, given their accounts of Jewish life in first-century Rome.

== Literary and cultural influence ==
Several maxims originate in Juvenal's Satires:

- Bread and circuses (X.81): Commoners can be placated with Panem et circenses (bread and circuses).
- Healthy mind in a healthy body (X.356): One should pray for a mens sana in corpore sano (healthy mind in a healthy body) rather than for wealth, power, eloquence, or children.
- Rare bird (VI.165): A perfect wife is a rara avis (rare bird). Juvenal refers to a "black swan" as a specific example of a rare bird.
- Honesty is praised and freezes (I.74): Fame and fortune is rewarded to criminals while probitas laudatur et alget (honesty is praised and freezes).
- Who watches the watchmen? (VI.347–8): Juvenal mocked the very notion of security by asking Quis custodiet ipsos custodes? (who watches the watchmen).

The footwear and sports equipment manufacturing company Asics is named after a Latin acronym for "anima sana in corpore sano" (a sound mind in a sound body), a variant on the maxim in Juvenal's Satire X.

Samuel Johnson used Juvenal as a model for two of his works: London: A Poem in Imitation of The Third Satire of Juvenal (1738) and The Vanity of Human Wishes: The Tenth Satire of Juvenal Imitated (1748). In Suspiria de Profundis (1845), Thomas De Quincey rhapsodized that no one wrote better indignant verses than Juvenal.

German writer Heinrich Böll was exposed to Juvenal's Satires by an anti-Nazi teacher in high school; "Mr. Bauer realized how topical Juvenal was, how he dealt at length with such phenomena as arbitrary government, tyranny, corruption, the degradation of public morals, the decline of the Republican ideal and the terrorizing acts of the Praetorian Guards...I found an 1838 translation of Juvenal with an extensive commentary, twice the length of the translated text itself, written at the height of the Romantic period...I read all of it very intensely, as if it was a detective novel. It was one of the few books to which I persistently held on throughout the war..."

Alexander Theroux identified Juvenal as his most important influence.
