= List of contemporary accounts of Samuel Johnson's life =

This article lists all known accounts of the British writer Samuel Johnson's life written by his contemporaries. They are listed by date of publication.

== Autobiographies ==
=== Annals ===
The Annals: An Account of the Life of Dr. Samuel Johnson, from his Birth to his Eleventh Year, written by himself were written by Samuel Johnson and kept in manuscript form until 1805, when it was printed by Nichols and Son in London.

== Accounts ==
Biography, as Johnson told the famous Shakespeare critic Edmond Malone, while discussion his own biographies (like his Preface to Shakespeare and his Lives of the Most Eminent English Poets), must be objective:

"If nothing but the bright side of characters should be shewn, we should sit down in despondency, and think it utterly impossible to imitate them in anything. The sacred writers (he observed) related the vicious as well as the virtuous actions of men; which had this moral effect, that it kept mankind from despair.

Hester Thrale described the possible biographers to Johnson on 18 July 1773:

"We chatted on about Authors till we talked of him himself, when he frankly owned he had never worked willingly in his Life Man or Boy nor ever did fairly make an Effort to do his best except three Times whilst he was at School, nor that he ever made it his Custom to read any of his Writings before he sent it to Press - Well now said I that will not be believed, even if your Biographer should relate it, which too perhaps he will not: I wonder said he who will be my Biographer? Goldsmith to be sure I replied if you should go first - and he would do it better than any body. - but then he would do maliciously says Johnson - As for that answer I we should all fasten upon him & make him do Justice in spite of himself. but the worst is the Doctor does not know your Life, nor in Truth can I tell who does, unless it be Taylor of Ashbourne: why Taylor is certainly said he well enough acquainted with my History at Oxford, which I believe he has nearly to himself, but Doctor James can give a better Account of my early Days than most Folks, except Mr Hector of Birmingham & little Doctor Adams. After my coming to London you will be at a Loss again; though Jack Hawkesworth and Baretti both, with who I lived quite familiarly, can tell pretty nearly all my Adventures from the Year 1753. however I intend to disappoint the Dogs, and either outlive them all or write my Life myself. But for a Johnsoniana cried I we will defy you at least; Boswell & Baretti; & myself from Time to Time have a trick of writing down Anecdotes Bons mots &c. & Doctor Percy will be busy at this work I warrant him: He would replied Mr Johnson, but I have purposely suffered him to be misled, and he has accordingly gleaned up many Things that are not true."

Many started to publish various accounts and anecdotes, but Hawkins became the first to publish what could be called a biography. In 1791, Boswell was able to publish his own life and used the introduction to attack rival biographies:

"But what is still worse, there is throughout the whole of it [Hawkin's Life] a dark uncharitable cast, by which the most unfavourable construction is put upon almost every circumstance in the character and conduct of my illustrious friend [Samuel Johnson]; who, I trust, will, be a true and fair delineation, be vindicated both from the injurious misrepresentation of this authour, and from the slighter aspersions of a lady who once lived in great intimacy with him."

In particular, it was Hawkins and Thrale, in Boswell's mind, were main rivals to "what he considered his domain".

=== A Biographical Sketch of Dr Samuel Johnson ===
A Biographical Sketch of Dr Samuel Johnson was written by Thomas Tyers for the December 1784 edition of The Gentleman's Magazine. It was the first postmortem biography of Johnson.

=== Memoirs of the Life and Writing of the Late Dr Samuel Johnson ===
Memoirs of the Life and Writing of the Late Dr Samuel Johnson, by William Shaw, was first published in 1785.

=== Anecdotes of the late Samuel Johnson ===
The Anecdotes of the late Samuel Johnson, LL.D., during the Last Twenty Years of his Life, by Hester Lynch Piozzi, was first published 26 March 1786. It was based on the various notes and anecdotes that Thrale kept in her Thraliana. Thrale wrote the work in Italy while she lived there for three years after marrying Gabriel Piozzi.

=== Life of Samuel Johnson 1787 ===
The Life of Samuel Johnson, LL.D., by John Hawkins, was first published in March, 1787. Sir John Hawkins, according to Bertram Davis, is "the author of the first full-length biograph of Samuel Johnson, many remember him as the man Johnson once described as 'unclubable'".

=== Life of Samuel Johnson 1791 ===
The Life of Samuel Johnson, LL.D. Comprehending an Account of his Studies and numerous works, in chronological order; a series of his epistolary correspondence and conversations with many eminent persons; and various original pieces of his composition, never before published: the whole exhibiting a view of literature and literary men in Great-Britain, for near half a century, during which he flourished, by James Boswell, was first published in 1791.

=== An Essay on the Life and Genius of Samuel Johnson ===
An Essay on the Life and Genius of Samuel Johnson, LL.D., by Arthur Murphy, was published in 1792.

=== Life of Samuel Johnson 1795 ===
The Life of Samuel Johnson, LL.D., by Robert Anderson, was published in 1795.

=== Thraliana ===
The Thraliana contains various anecdotes and stories during Thrale's life but also includes extensive discussions of Johnson's life; part of the early work was a series of "Johnsonian" anecdotes which Boswell was hoping to rely on for his Life. The first two volumes and half of the third volume is devoted to the time Thrale spent with Johnson. After her husband's death, the work turned into a diary that documented her personal life and feelings. In July 1784, she married Gabriel Piozzi and left to Italy, which marked the end of her documentation of Johnson's life.

=== Diary and Letters ===
The Diary and Letters of Madame d'Arblay, by Frances Burney, was published in 1843.
