= Samuel Johnson =

English writer and polymath (1709–1784)

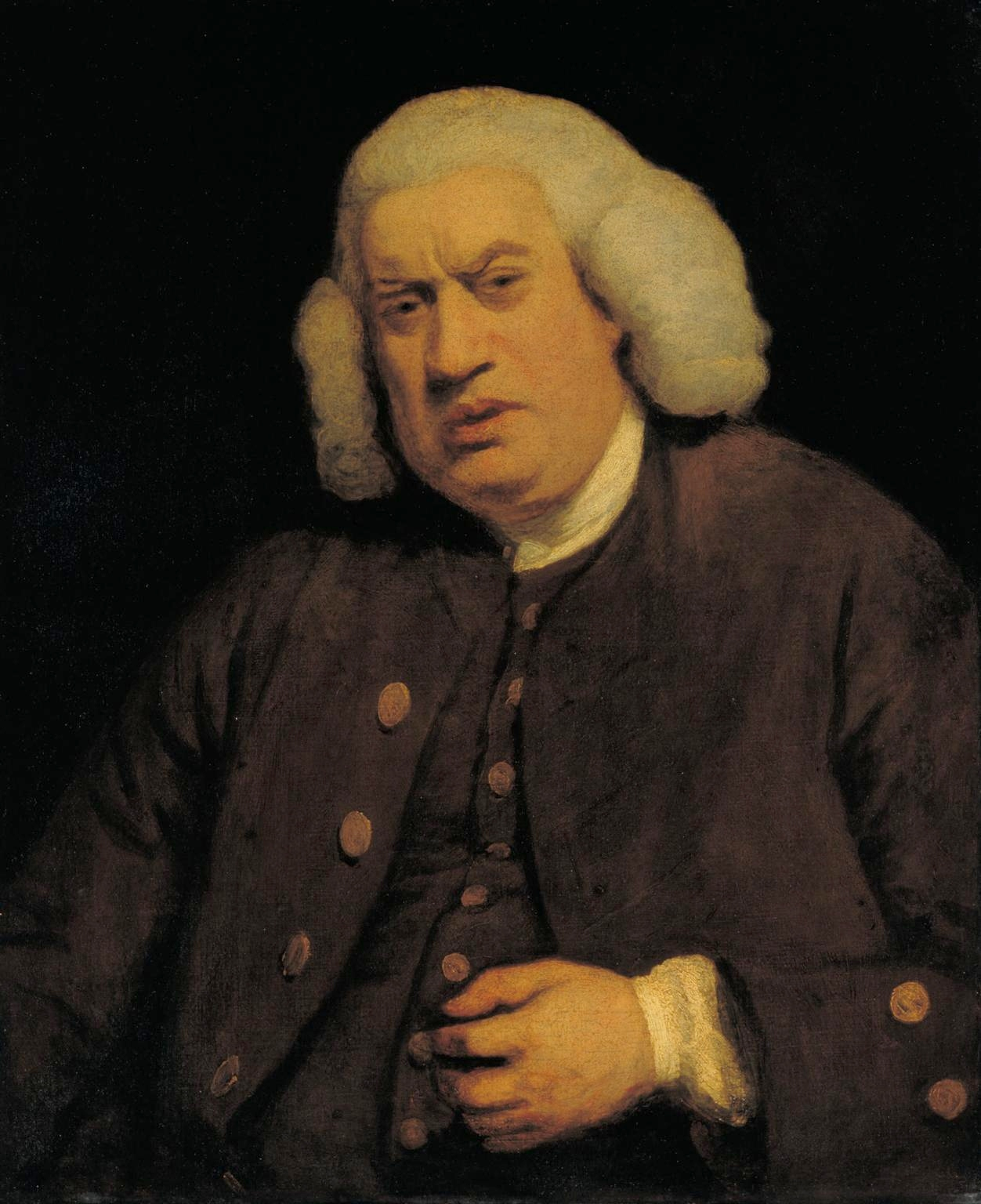
- Portrait c. 1772
- Born: 18 September 1709 (O.S. 7 September); Lichfield, England
- Died: 13 December 1784 (aged 75); London, England
- Resting place: Westminster Abbey
- Other name: Dr Johnson
- Education: Pembroke College, Oxford
- Political party: Tory
- Spouse: Elizabeth Porter (née Jervis) (m. 1735; died 1752)
- Writing career
- Language: English, Latin
- Notable works: A Dictionary of the English Language (1755); A Journey to the Western Isles of Scotland (1775)

Samuel Johnson (18 September [O.S. 7 September] 1709 – 13 December 1784), often called Dr Johnson, was an English writer and polymath who made lasting contributions as a poet, playwright, essayist, moralist, literary critic, sermonist, biographer, editor, and lexicographer (creator of dictionaries). The work for which he is best known is his 42,733-entry Dictionary of the English Language (1755). For this and other contributions in and to the English language, the Oxford Dictionary of National Biography has called him "arguably the most distinguished man of letters in English history".

Born in Lichfield, Staffordshire, he attended Pembroke College, Oxford, until lack of funds forced him to leave. After working as a teacher, he moved to London and began writing for The Gentleman's Magazine. Early works include the poem London (1738), the biography Life of Mr Richard Savage (1744), the poem The Vanity of Human Wishes (1749) and the play Irene (1749). After nine years' effort, Johnson's A Dictionary of the English Language (1755) appeared and was acclaimed as "one of the greatest single achievements of scholarship". Later works included The History of Rasselas, Prince of Abissinia (1759) and The Plays of William Shakespeare (1765). In 1763, he befriended James Boswell, with whom he travelled to Scotland; Johnson described his travels in A Journey to the Western Islands of Scotland (1775). Near the end of his life, he authored the voluminous and highly influential Lives of the Most Eminent English Poets (1779–1781), a series of biographies and critical appraisals of 52 poets of the 17th and 18th centuries.

Johnson was a devout Anglican Christian and a committed Tory. Although tall and robust, he was deaf in one ear and blind in one eye. For most of his life he made regular and uncontrolled gestures and tics that disconcerted some upon meeting him. Boswell and other biographers documented Johnson's behaviour and mannerisms in such detail that they have informed a posthumous diagnosis of Tourette syndrome, a condition neither defined nor manageable in the 18th century. After several illnesses, and extended periods of mental struggle and loneliness, Johnson died on the evening of 13 December 1784, aged 75; he is buried in Westminster Abbey.

Johnson became a celebrity in his later life, "the acknowledged Head of Literature in this kingdom". Following his death, he was increasingly recognised as having had a major and lasting effect on the practice of literary criticism—it was even claimed that he was the one truly great critic of English literature. A prevailing mode of literary theory in the 20th century (one focused upon the language used by literature) drew heavily upon his work, and he likewise had a lasting impact on the forms, research and writing of biography. Johnson's Dictionary had and continues to have far-reaching effects on Modern English—this was an early, major, and widely respected, dictionary of English: it was pre-eminent, at least until the arrival of the Oxford English Dictionary some 150 years later. His life was also a story worth telling: Boswell's 1791 biography, The Life of Samuel Johnson, LLD, was selected by fellow Johnson-biographer Walter Jackson Bate as "the most famous single work of biographical art in the whole of literature".

== Life and career ==
=== Early life and education ===
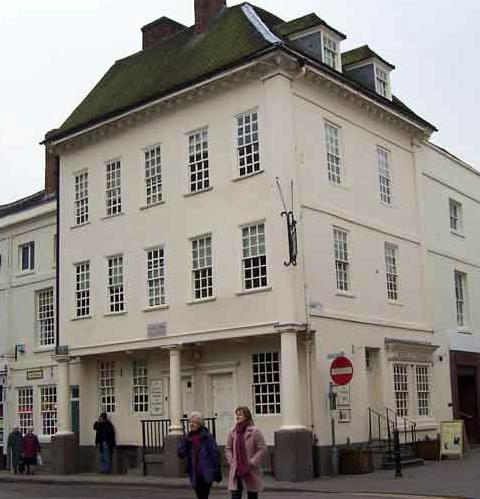
Johnson's birthplace in Market Square, Lichfield

Samuel Johnson was born on 18 September 1709 to bookseller Michael Johnson and his wife Sarah (née Ford). His mother was 40 when she gave birth to Johnson in the family home above his father's bookshop in Lichfield, Staffordshire. This was considered an unusually late pregnancy, so a man-midwife and surgeon of "great reputation" named George Hector was brought in to assist. The infant Johnson did not cry, and there were concerns for his health. His aunt exclaimed that "she would not have picked such a poor creature up in the street". The family feared that Johnson would not survive, and summoned the vicar of St Mary's to perform a baptism. Two godfathers were chosen, Samuel Swynfen, a physician and graduate of Pembroke College, Oxford, and Richard Wakefield, a lawyer, coroner and Lichfield town clerk.

Johnson's health improved and he was put to wet-nurse with Joan Marklew. Some time later he contracted scrofula, known at the time as the "King's Evil" because it was thought that "royal touch" could cure it. Upon the recommendation of Sir John Floyer, former physician to King Charles II, the young Johnson was touched by Queen Anne on 30 March 1712. However, the ritual proved ineffective, and an operation was performed that left him with permanent scars across his face and body. Queen Anne gave Johnson an amulet on a chain he would wear the rest of his life.

When Johnson was three, his brother Nathaniel was born. In a letter he wrote to his mother, Nathaniel complained that Johnson "would scarcely ever use me with common civility." With the birth of Johnson's brother their father was unable to pay the debts he had accrued over the years, and the family was no longer able to maintain its standard of living.

When he was a child in petticoats, and had learnt to read, Mrs. Johnson one morning put the common prayer-book into his hands, pointed to the collect for the day, and said, "Sam, you must get this by heart." She went up stairs, leaving him to study it: But by the time she had reached the second floor, she heard him following her. "What's the matter?" said she. "I can say it," he replied; and repeated it distinctly, though he could not have read it more than twice.

— Boswell's Life of Johnson

Johnson displayed signs of great intelligence as a child, and his parents, to his later disgust, would show off his "newly acquired accomplishments". His education began at the age of three, and was provided by his mother, who had him memorise and recite passages from the Book of Common Prayer. When Samuel turned four, he was sent to a nearby school, and, at the age of six he was sent to a retired shoemaker to continue his education.

A year later Johnson went to Lichfield Grammar School, where he excelled in Latin. For his most personal poems, Johnson used Latin. During this time, Johnson started to exhibit the tics that would influence how people viewed him in his later years, and which formed the basis for a posthumous diagnosis of Tourette syndrome. He excelled at his studies and was promoted to the upper school at the age of nine. During this time, he befriended Edmund Hector, nephew of his "man-midwife" George Hector, and John Taylor, with whom he remained in contact for the rest of his life.

At the age of 16, Johnson stayed with his cousins, the Fords, at Pedmore, Worcestershire. There he became a close friend of Cornelius Ford, who employed his knowledge of the classics to tutor Johnson while he was not attending school. Ford was a successful, well-connected academic, and notorious alcoholic whose excesses contributed to his death six years later. After spending six months with his cousins, Johnson returned to Lichfield, but Hunter, the headmaster, "angered by the impertinence of this long absence", refused to allow Johnson to continue at the school. Unable to return to Lichfield Grammar School, Johnson enrolled at the King Edward VI grammar school at Stourbridge. As the school was located near Pedmore, Johnson was able to spend more time with the Fords, and he began to write poems and verse translations. He spent six months at Stourbridge before returning to his parents' home in Lichfield.

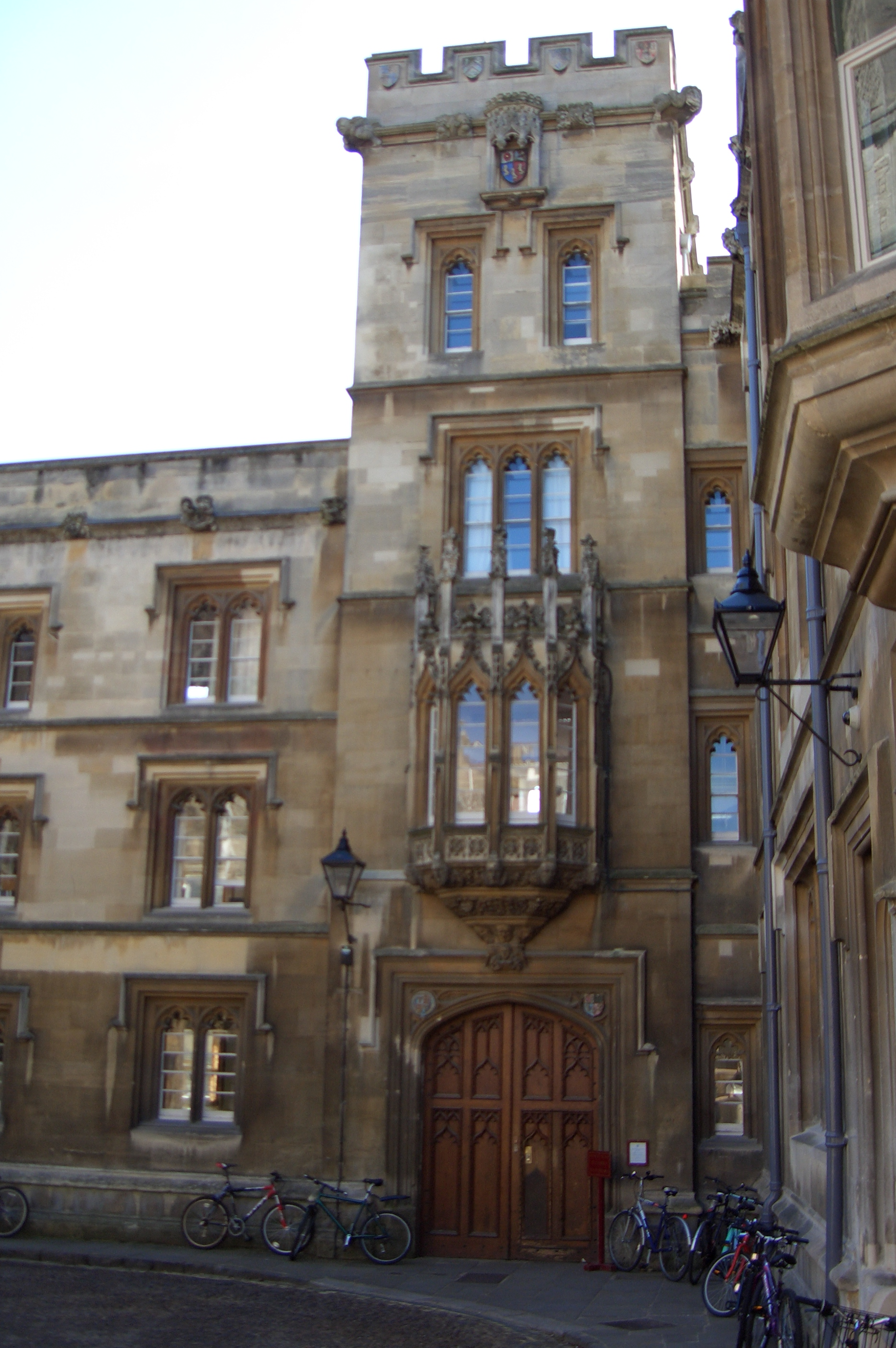
Entrance of Pembroke College, Oxford

During this time, Johnson's future remained uncertain because his father was deeply in debt. To earn money, Johnson began to stitch books for his father, and it is likely that Johnson spent much time in his father's bookshop reading and building his literary knowledge. The family remained in poverty until his mother's cousin Elizabeth Harriotts died in February 1728 and left enough money to send Johnson to university. On 31 October 1728, a few weeks after he turned 19, Johnson entered Pembroke College, Oxford. The inheritance did not cover all of his expenses at Pembroke, and Andrew Corbet, a friend and fellow student at the college, offered to make up the deficit.

Johnson made friends at Pembroke and read much. (Note: Bate (1977) comments that Johnson's standard of effort was very high, so high that Johnson said he had never known a man to study hard.) His tutor asked him to produce a Latin translation of Alexander Pope's Messiah as a Christmas exercise. Johnson completed half of the translation in one afternoon and the rest the following morning. Although the poem brought him praise, it did not bring the material benefit he had hoped for. The poem later appeared in Miscellany of Poems (1731), edited by John Husbands, a Pembroke tutor, and is the earliest surviving publication of any of Johnson's writings. Johnson spent the rest of his time studying, even during the Christmas holiday. He drafted a "plan of study" called "Adversaria", which he left unfinished, and used his time to learn French while working on his Greek.

Johnson's tutor, Jorden, left Pembroke some months after Johnson's arrival, and was replaced by William Adams. Johnson enjoyed Adams's tutoring, but by December, was already a quarter behind in his student fees, and was forced to return to Lichfield without a degree, having spent 13 months at Oxford. He left behind many books that he had borrowed from his father because he could not afford to transport them, and also because he hoped to return.

He eventually did receive a degree. Just before the publication of his Dictionary in 1755, the University of Oxford awarded Johnson the degree of Master of Arts. He was awarded an honorary doctorate in 1765 by Trinity College Dublin and in 1775 by the University of Oxford. In 1776 he returned to Pembroke with Boswell and toured the college with his former tutor Adams, who by then was the Master of the college. During that visit he recalled his time at the college and his early career, and expressed his later fondness for Jorden.

=== Early career ===
Little is known about Johnson's life between the end of 1729 and 1731. It is likely that he lived with his parents. He experienced bouts of mental anguish and physical pain during years of illness; his tics and gesticulations associated with Tourette syndrome became more noticeable and were often commented upon. By 1731 Johnson's father was deeply in debt and had lost much of his standing in Lichfield. Johnson hoped to obtain the position of a school usher, which became available at Stourbridge Grammar School, but since he did not have a degree, his application was passed over on 6 September 1731.

At about this time, Johnson's father became ill and developed an "inflammatory fever" which led to his death in December 1731 when Johnson was twenty-two. Devastated by his father's death, Johnson sought to atone for an occasion he did not go with his father to sell books. Johnson stood for a "considerable time bareheaded in the rain" in the spot his father's stall used to be. After the publication of Boswell's Life of Samuel Johnson, a statue was erected in that spot.

Johnson eventually found employment as undermaster at a school in Market Bosworth, run by Sir Wolstan Dixie, who allowed Johnson to teach without a degree. Johnson was treated as a servant, and considered teaching boring, but nonetheless found pleasure in it. After an argument with Dixie he left the school, and by June 1732 he had returned home.

Johnson continued to look for a position at a Lichfield school. After being turned down for a job at Ashbourne School, he spent time with his friend Edmund Hector, who was living in the home of the publisher Thomas Warren. At the time, Warren was starting his Birmingham Journal, and he enlisted Johnson's help. This connection with Warren grew, and Johnson proposed a translation of Jerónimo Lobo's account of the Abyssinians. Johnson read Abbé Joachim Le Grand's French translations, and thought that a shorter version might be "useful and profitable". Instead of writing the work himself, he dictated to Hector, who then took the copy to the printer and made any corrections. Johnson's A Voyage to Abyssinia was published a year later. He returned to Lichfield in February 1734, and began an annotated edition of Poliziano's Latin poems, along with a history of Latin poetry from Petrarch to Poliziano; a Proposal was soon printed, but a lack of funds halted the project.

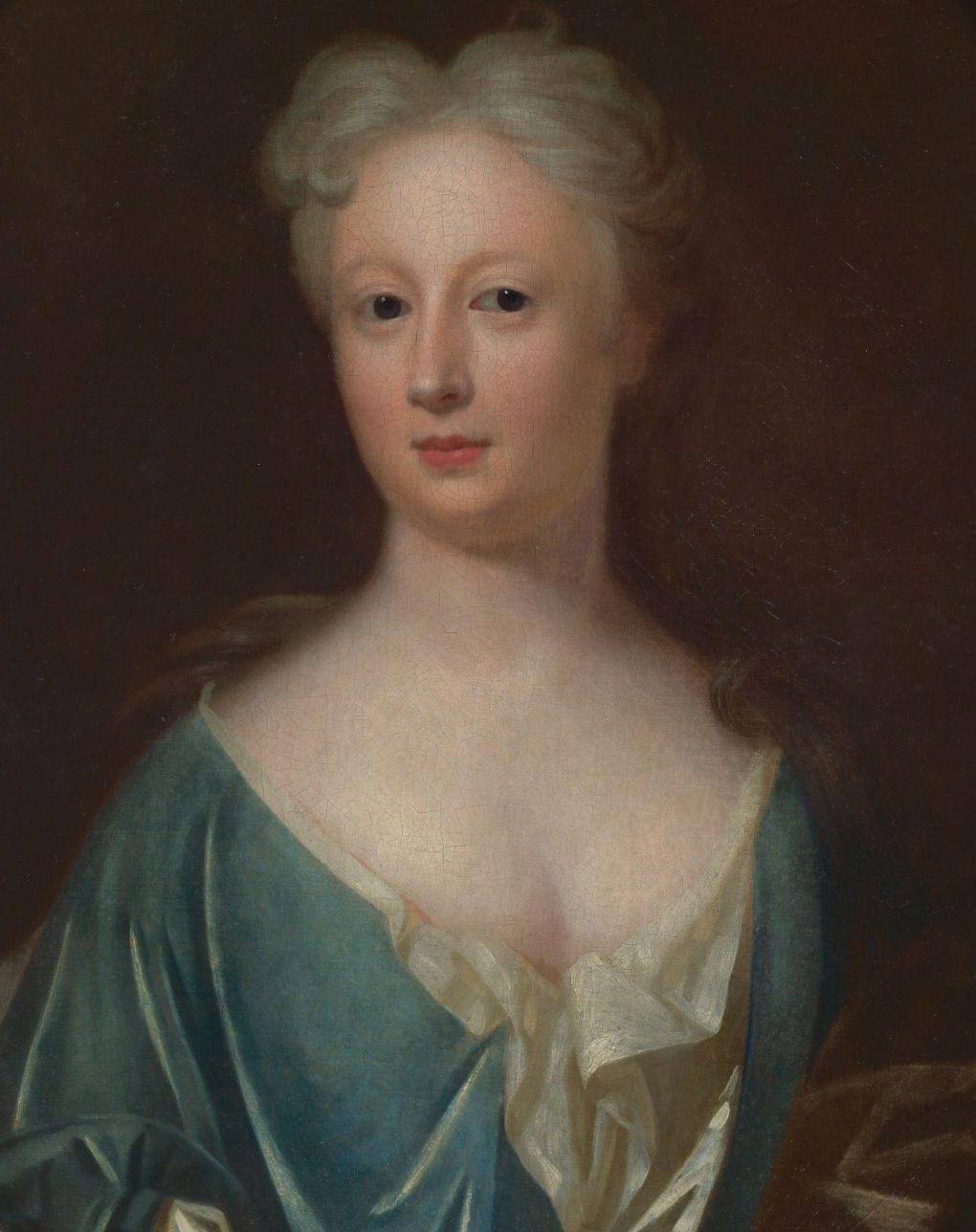
Elizabeth "Tetty" Porter, Johnson's wife

Johnson remained with his close friend Harry Porter during a terminal illness, which ended in Porter's death on 3 September 1734. Porter's wife Elizabeth (née Jervis) (otherwise known as "Tetty") was now a widow at the age of 45, with three children. Some months later, Johnson began to court her. William Shaw, a friend and biographer of Johnson, claims that "the first advances probably proceeded from her, as her attachment to Johnson was in opposition to the advice and desire of all her relations," Johnson was inexperienced in such relationships, but the well-to-do widow encouraged him and promised to provide for him with her substantial savings. They married on 9 July 1735, at St Werburgh's Church in Derby. The Porter family did not approve of the match, partly because of the difference in their ages: Johnson was 25 and Elizabeth was 46. Elizabeth's marriage to Johnson so disgusted her son Jervis that he severed all relations with her. However, her daughter Lucy accepted Johnson from the start, and her other son, Joseph, later came to accept the marriage.

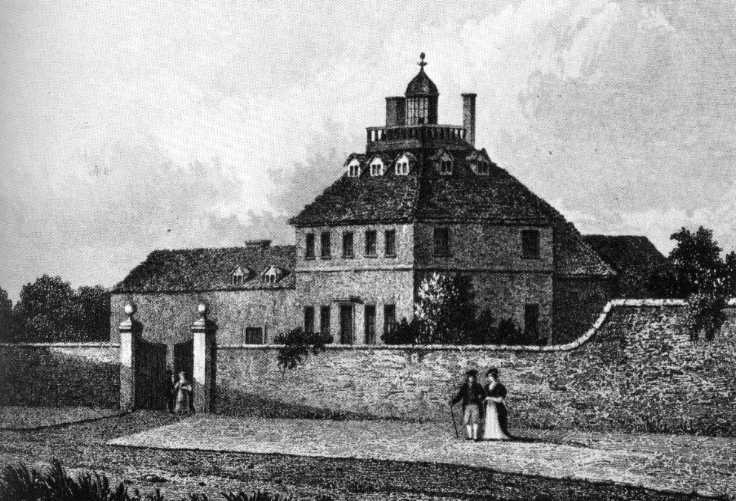
Edial Hall School

In June 1735, while working as a tutor for the children of Thomas Whitby, a local Staffordshire gentleman, Johnson had applied for the position of headmaster at Solihull School. Although Johnson's friend Gilbert Walmisley gave his support, Johnson was passed over because the school's directors thought he was "a very haughty, ill-natured gent, and that he has such a way of distorting his face (which though he can't help) the gents think it may affect some lads". With Walmisley's encouragement, Johnson decided that he could be a successful teacher if he ran his own school. In the autumn of 1735, Johnson opened Edial Hall School as a private academy at Edial, near Lichfield. He had only three pupils: Lawrence Offley, George Garrick, and the 18-year-old David Garrick, who later became one of the most famous actors of his day. The venture was unsuccessful and cost Tetty a substantial portion of her fortune. Instead of trying to keep the failing school going, Johnson began to write his first major work, the historical tragedy Irene. Biographer Robert DeMaria believed that Tourette syndrome likely made public occupations like schoolmaster or tutor almost impossible for Johnson. This may have led Johnson to "the invisible occupation of authorship".

Johnson left for London with his former pupil David Garrick on 2 March 1737, the day Johnson's brother died. He was penniless and pessimistic about their travel, but fortunately for them, Garrick had connections in London, and the two were able to stay with his distant relative, Richard Norris. Johnson soon moved to Greenwich near the Golden Hart Tavern to finish Irene. On 12 July 1737 he wrote to Edward Cave with a proposal for a translation of Paolo Sarpi's The History of the Council of Trent (1619), which Cave did not accept until months later. In October 1737 Johnson brought his wife to London, and he found employment with Cave as a writer for The Gentleman's Magazine. His assignments for the magazine and other publishers during this time were "almost unparalleled in range and variety," and "so numerous, so varied and scattered" that "Johnson himself could not make a complete list".

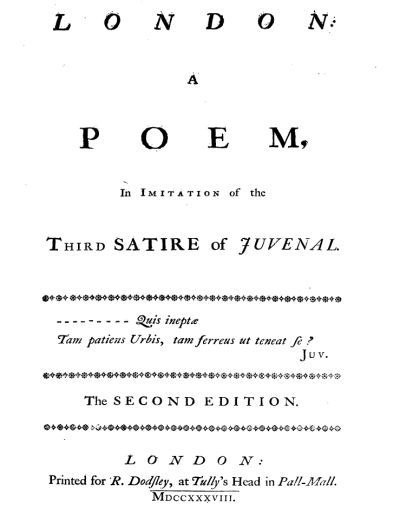
Title page of London second edition

In May 1738 his first major work, the poem London, was published anonymously. Based on Juvenal's Satire III, it describes the character Thales leaving for Wales to escape the problems of London, which is portrayed as a place of crime, corruption, and poverty. Johnson could not bring himself to regard the poem as earning him any merit as a poet. Alexander Pope said that the author "will soon be déterré" (unearthed, dug up), but this would not happen until 15 years later.

In August, Johnson's lack of an MA degree from Oxford or Cambridge led to his being denied a position as master of the Appleby Grammar School. In an effort to end such rejections, Pope asked Lord Gower to use his influence to have a degree awarded to Johnson. Gower petitioned Oxford for an honorary degree to be awarded to Johnson, but was told that it was "too much to be asked". Gower then asked a friend of Jonathan Swift to plead with Swift to use his influence at Trinity College Dublin to have a master's degree awarded to Johnson, in the hope that this could then be used to justify an MA from Oxford, but these efforts were again in vain, and unforthcoming.

Between 1737 and 1739, Johnson befriended poet Richard Savage. Feeling guilty of living almost entirely on Tetty's money, Johnson stopped living with her and spent his time with Savage. They were poor and would stay in taverns or sleep in "night-cellars". Some nights they would roam the streets until dawn because they had no money. During this period, Johnson and Savage worked as Grub Street writers who anonymously supplied publishers with on-demand material. In his Dictionary, Johnson defined "grub street" as "the name of a street in Moorfields in London, much inhabited by writers of small histories, dictionaries, and temporary poems, whence any mean production is called grubstreet." Savage's friends tried to help him by attempting to persuade him to move to Wales, but Savage ended up in Bristol and again fell into debt. He was committed to debtors' prison and died in 1743. A year later, Johnson wrote Life of Mr Richard Savage (1744), a "moving" work which, in the words of the biographer and critic Walter Jackson Bate, "remains one of the innovative works in the history of biography".

=== A Dictionary of the English Language ===
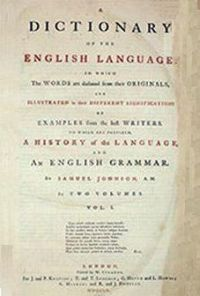
Johnson's Dictionary Vol. 1 (1755) title page

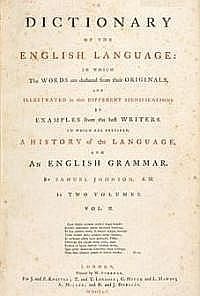
Johnson's Dictionary Vol. 2 (1755) title page

In 1746, a group of publishers approached Johnson with the idea of creating an authoritative dictionary of the English language. A contract with William Strahan and associates, worth 1,500 guineas, was signed on the morning of 18 June 1746. Johnson claimed that he could finish the project in three years. In comparison, the Académie Française had 40 scholars spending 40 years to complete their dictionary, which prompted Johnson to claim, "This is the proportion. Let me see; forty times forty is sixteen hundred. As three to sixteen hundred, so is the proportion of an Englishman to a Frenchman." Although he did not succeed in completing the work in three years, he did manage to finish it in eight. Some criticised the dictionary, including the historian Thomas Babington Macaulay, who described Johnson as "a wretched etymologist," but according to Bate, the Dictionary "easily ranks as one of the greatest single achievements of scholarship, and probably the greatest ever performed by one individual who laboured under anything like the disadvantages in a comparable length of time."

Johnson's constant work on the Dictionary disrupted his and Tetty's living conditions. He had to employ a number of assistants for the copying and mechanical work, which filled the house with incessant noise and clutter. He was always busy, and kept hundreds of books around him. John Hawkins described the scene: "The books he used for this purpose were what he had in his own collection, a copious but a miserably ragged one, and all such as he could borrow; which latter, if ever they came back to those that lent them, were so defaced as to be scarce worth owning." Johnson's process included underlining words in the numerous books he wanted to include in his Dictionary. The assistants would copy out the underlined sentences on individual paper slips, which would later be alphabetized and accompanied with examples. Johnson was also distracted by Tetty's poor health as she began to show signs of a terminal illness. To accommodate both his wife and his work, he moved to 17 Gough Square near his printer, William Strahan.

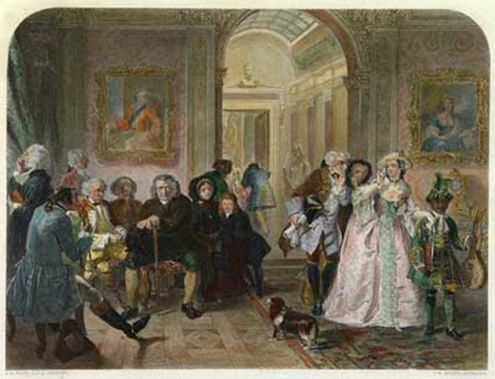
Dr. Johnson in the ante-room of Lord Chesterfield. Coloured engraving by E.M. Ward.

In preparation, Johnson wrote Plan of a Dictionary of the English Language in 1747, of which Philip Stanhope, 4th Earl of Chesterfield was the patron, to Johnson's displeasure. Seven years after first meeting Johnson to go over the work, Chesterfield wrote two anonymous essays in The World recommending the Dictionary. He complained that the English language lacked structure and argued in support of the dictionary. Johnson did not like the tone of the essays, and he felt that Chesterfield had not fulfilled his obligations as the work's patron. In a letter to Chesterfield, Johnson expressed this view and harshly criticised Chesterfield, saying "Is not a patron, my lord, one who looks with unconcern on a man struggling for life in the water, and when he has reached ground, encumbers him with help? The notice which you have been pleased to take of my labours, had it been early, had been kind: but it has been delayed till I am indifferent and cannot enjoy it; till I am solitary and cannot impart it; till I am known and do not want it." Chesterfield, impressed by the language, kept the letter displayed on a table for anyone to read.

The Dictionary was finally published in April 1755, with the title page noting that the University of Oxford had awarded Johnson a Master of Arts degree in anticipation of the work. The dictionary as published was a large book. Its pages were nearly 18 inches (46 cm) tall, and the book was 20 inches (51 cm) wide when opened; it contained 42,773 entries, to which only a few more were added in subsequent editions, and it sold for the extravagant price of £4 10s, perhaps the rough equivalent of £350 today. An important innovation in English lexicography was to illustrate the meanings of his words by literary quotation, of which there were approximately 114,000. The authors most frequently cited include William Shakespeare, John Milton and John Dryden. It was years before Johnson's Dictionary, as it came to be known, turned a profit. Authors' royalties were unknown at the time, and Johnson, once his contract to deliver the book was fulfilled, received no further money from its sale. Years later, many of its quotations would be repeated by various editions of the Webster's Dictionary and the New English Dictionary.

Johnson's dictionary was not the first, nor was it unique. Other dictionaries, such as Nathan Bailey's Dictionarium Britannicum, included more words, and in the 150 years preceding Johnson's dictionary about twenty other general-purpose monolingual "English" dictionaries had been produced. However, there was open dissatisfaction with the dictionaries of the period. In 1741, David Hume claimed: "The Elegance and Propriety of Stile have been very much neglected among us. We have no Dictionary of our Language, and scarce a tolerable Grammar." Johnson's Dictionary offers insights into the 18th century and "a faithful record of the language people used". It is more than a reference book; it is a work of literature. It was the most commonly used and imitated for the 150 years between its first publication and the completion of the Oxford English Dictionary in 1928.

Johnson also wrote numerous essays, sermons, and poems during his years working on the dictionary. In 1750, he decided to produce a series of essays under the title The Rambler that were to be published every Tuesday and Saturday and sell for twopence each. During this time, Johnson published no fewer than 208 essays, each around 1,200–1,500 words long. Explaining the title years later, he told his friend and portraitist Joshua Reynolds: "I was at a loss how to name it. I sat down at night upon my bedside, and resolved that I would not go to sleep till I had fixed its title. The Rambler seemed the best that occurred, and I took it." These essays, often on moral and religious topics, tended to be more grave than the title of the series would suggest; his first comments in The Rambler were to ask "that in this undertaking thy Holy Spirit may not be withheld from me, but that I may promote thy glory, and the salvation of myself and others." The popularity of The Rambler took off once the issues were collected in a volume; they were reprinted nine times during Johnson's life. Writer and printer Samuel Richardson, enjoying the essays greatly, questioned the publisher as to who wrote the works; only he and a few of Johnson's friends were told of Johnson's authorship. One friend, the novelist Charlotte Lennox, includes a defence of The Rambler in her novel The Female Quixote (1752). In particular, the character Mr. Glanville says, "you may sit in Judgment upon the Productions of a Young, a Richardson, or a Johnson. Rail with premeditated Malice at the Rambler; and for the want of Faults, turn even its inimitable Beauties into Ridicule." (Book VI, Chapter XI) Later, the novel describes Johnson as "the greatest Genius in the present Age."

His necessary attendance while his play was in rehearsal, and during its performance, brought him acquainted with many of the performers of both sexes, which produced a more favourable opinion of their profession than he had harshly expressed in his Life of Savage. With some of them he kept up an acquaintance as long as he and they lived, and was ever ready to shew them acts of kindness. He for a considerable time used to frequent the Green Room, and seemed to take delight in dissipating his gloom, by mixing in the sprightly chit-chat of the motley circle then to be found there. Mr. David Hume related to me from Mr. Garrick, that Johnson at last denied himself this amusement, from considerations of rigid virtue; saying, "I'll come no more behind your scenes, David; for the silk stockings and white bosoms of your actresses excite my amorous propensities."

— Boswell's Life of Samuel Johnson

Not all of his work was confined to The Rambler. His most highly regarded poem, The Vanity of Human Wishes, was written with such "extraordinary speed" that Boswell claimed Johnson "might have been perpetually a poet". The poem is an imitation of Juvenal's Satire X and claims that "the antidote to vain human wishes is non-vain spiritual wishes". In particular, Johnson emphasises "the helpless vulnerability of the individual before the social context" and the "inevitable self-deception by which human beings are led astray". The poem was critically celebrated but it failed to become popular, and sold fewer copies than London. In 1749, Garrick made good on his promise that he would produce Irene, but its title was altered to Mahomet and Irene to make it "fit for the stage." Irene, which was written in blank verse, was received rather poorly with a friend of Boswell's commenting the play to be "as frigid as the regions of Nova Zembla: now and then you felt a little heat like what is produced by touching ice." The show eventually ran for nine nights.

Tetty Johnson was ill during most of her time in London, and in 1752 she decided to return to the countryside while Johnson was busy working on his Dictionary. She died on 17 March 1752, and, at word of her death, Johnson wrote a letter to his old friend Taylor, which according to Taylor "expressed grief in the strongest manner he had ever read". Johnson wrote a sermon in her honour, to be read at her funeral, but Taylor refused to read it, for reasons which are unknown. This only exacerbated Johnson's feelings of loss and despair. Consequently, John Hawkesworth had to organise the funeral. Johnson felt guilty about the poverty in which he believed he had forced Tetty to live, and blamed himself for neglecting her. He became outwardly discontented, and his diary was filled with prayers and laments over her death which continued until his own. She was his primary motivation, and her death hindered his ability to complete his work.

=== Later career ===
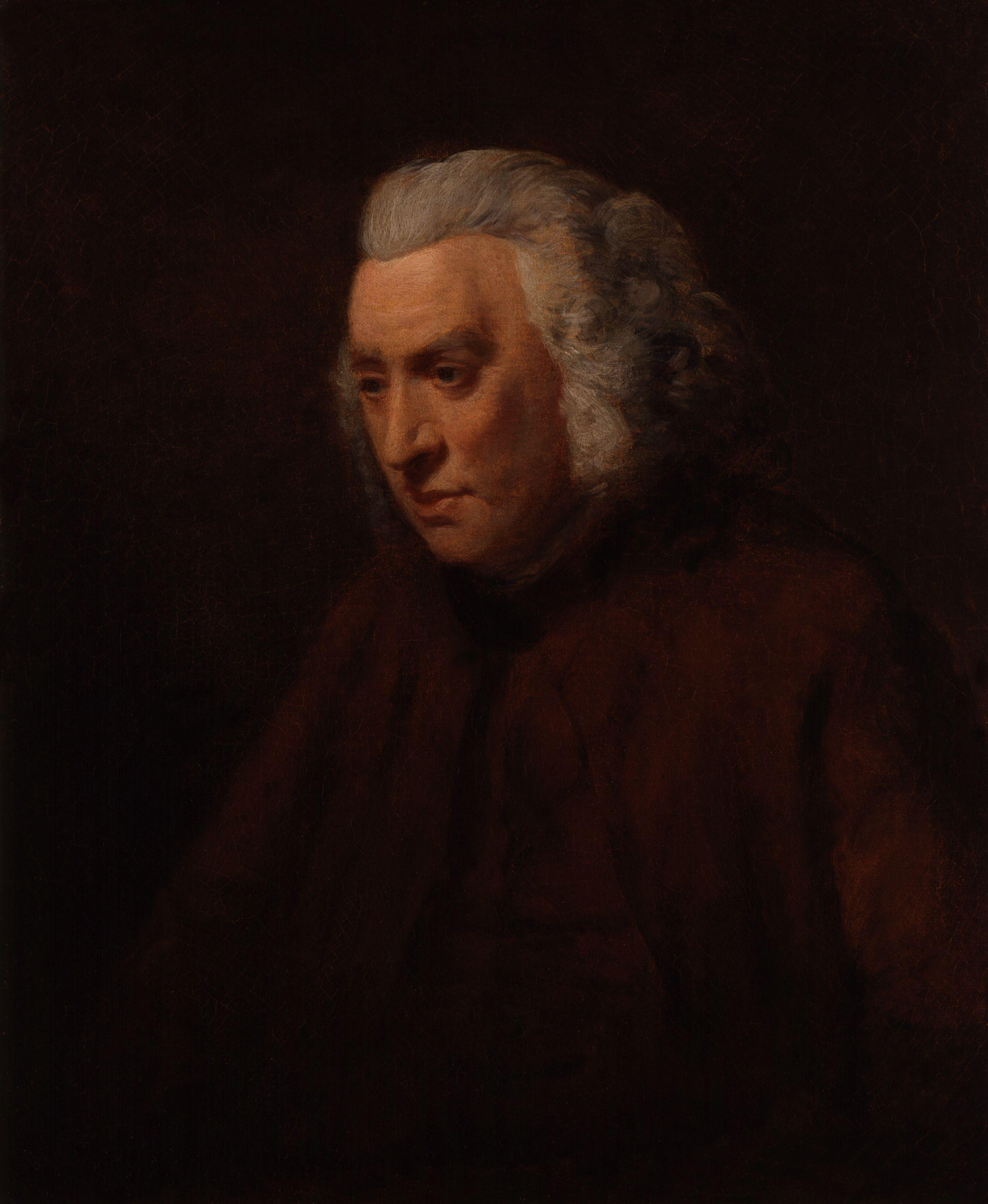
Johnson, by John Opie

On 16 March 1756, Johnson was arrested for an outstanding debt of £5 18s. Unable to contact anyone else, he wrote to the writer and publisher Samuel Richardson. Richardson, who had previously lent Johnson money, sent him six guineas to show his good will, and the two became friends. Soon after, Johnson met and befriended the painter Joshua Reynolds, who so impressed Johnson that he declared him "almost the only man whom I call a friend". Reynolds's younger sister Frances observed during their time together "that men, women and children gathered around him [Johnson]", laughing at his gestures and gesticulations. In addition to Reynolds, Johnson was close to Bennet Langton and Arthur Murphy. Langton was a scholar and an admirer of Johnson who persuaded his way into a meeting with Johnson which led to a long friendship. Johnson met Murphy during the summer of 1754 after Murphy came to Johnson about the accidental republishing of the Rambler No. 190, and the two became friends. Around this time, Anna Williams began boarding with Johnson. She was a minor poet who was poor and becoming blind, two conditions that Johnson attempted to change by providing room for her and paying for a failed cataract surgery. Williams, in turn, became Johnson's housekeeper.

To occupy himself, Johnson began to work on The Literary Magazine, or Universal Review, the first issue of which was printed on 19 March 1756. Philosophical disagreements erupted over the purpose of the publication when the Seven Years' War began and Johnson started to write polemical essays attacking the war. After the war began, the Magazine included many reviews, at least 34 of which were written by Johnson. When not working on the Magazine, Johnson wrote a series of prefaces for other writers, such as Giuseppe Baretti, William Payne and Charlotte Lennox. Johnson's relationship with Lennox and her works was particularly close during these years, and she in turn relied so heavily upon Johnson that he was "the most important single fact in Mrs Lennox's literary life". He later attempted to produce a new edition of her works, but even with his support they were unable to find enough interest to follow through with its publication. To help with domestic duties while Johnson was busy with his various projects, Richard Bathurst, a physician and a member of Johnson's Club, pressured him to take on a freed slave, Francis Barber, as his servant.

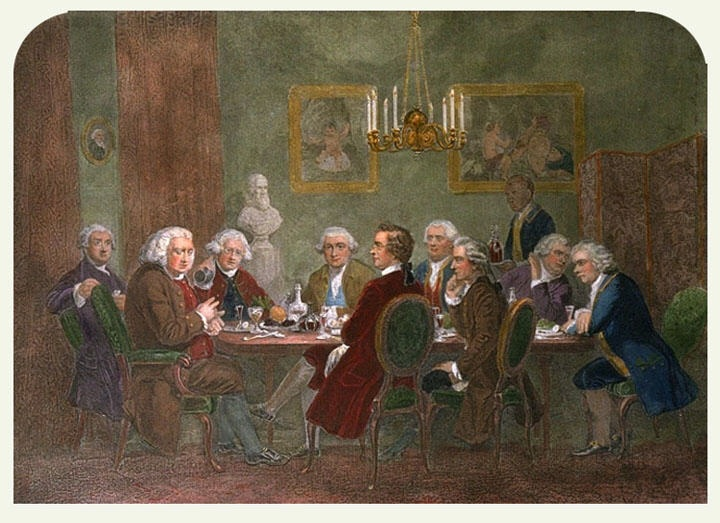
A literary party, 1781, of Johnson (second from left) and other members of "The Club"

Johnson's work on The Plays of William Shakespeare took up most of his time. On 8 June 1756, Johnson published his Proposals for Printing, by Subscription, the Dramatick Works of William Shakespeare, which argued that previous editions of Shakespeare were edited incorrectly and needed to be corrected. Johnson's progress on the work slowed as the months passed, and he told music historian Charles Burney in December 1757 that it would take him until the following March to complete it. Before that could happen, he was arrested again, for a debt of £40, in February 1758. The debt was soon repaid by Jacob Tonson, who had contracted Johnson to publish Shakespeare, and this encouraged Johnson to finish his edition to repay the favour. Although it took him another seven years to finish, Johnson completed a few volumes of his Shakespeare to prove his commitment to the project.

In 1758, Johnson began to write a weekly series, The Idler, which ran from 15 April 1758 to 5 April 1760, as a way to avoid finishing his Shakespeare. This series was shorter and lacked many features of The Rambler. Unlike his independent publication of The Rambler, The Idler was published in a weekly news journal The Universal Chronicle, a publication supported by John Payne, John Newbery, Robert Stevens and William Faden.

Since The Idler did not occupy all Johnson's time, he was able to publish his philosophical novella Rasselas on 19 April 1759. The "little story book", as Johnson described it, describes the life of Prince Rasselas and Nekayah, his sister, who are kept in a place called the Happy Valley in the land of Abyssinia. The Valley is a place free of problems, where any desire is quickly satisfied. The constant pleasure does not, however, lead to satisfaction; and, with the help of a philosopher named Imlac, Rasselas escapes and explores the world to witness how all aspects of society and life in the outside world are filled with suffering. They return to Abyssinia, but do not wish to return to the state of constantly fulfilled pleasures found in the Happy Valley. Rasselas was written in one week to pay for his mother's funeral and settle her debts; it became so popular that there was a new English edition of the work almost every year. References to it appear in many later works of fiction, including Jane Eyre, Cranford and The House of the Seven Gables. Its fame was not limited to English-speaking nations: Rasselas was immediately translated into five languages (French, Dutch, German, Russian and Italian), and later into nine others.

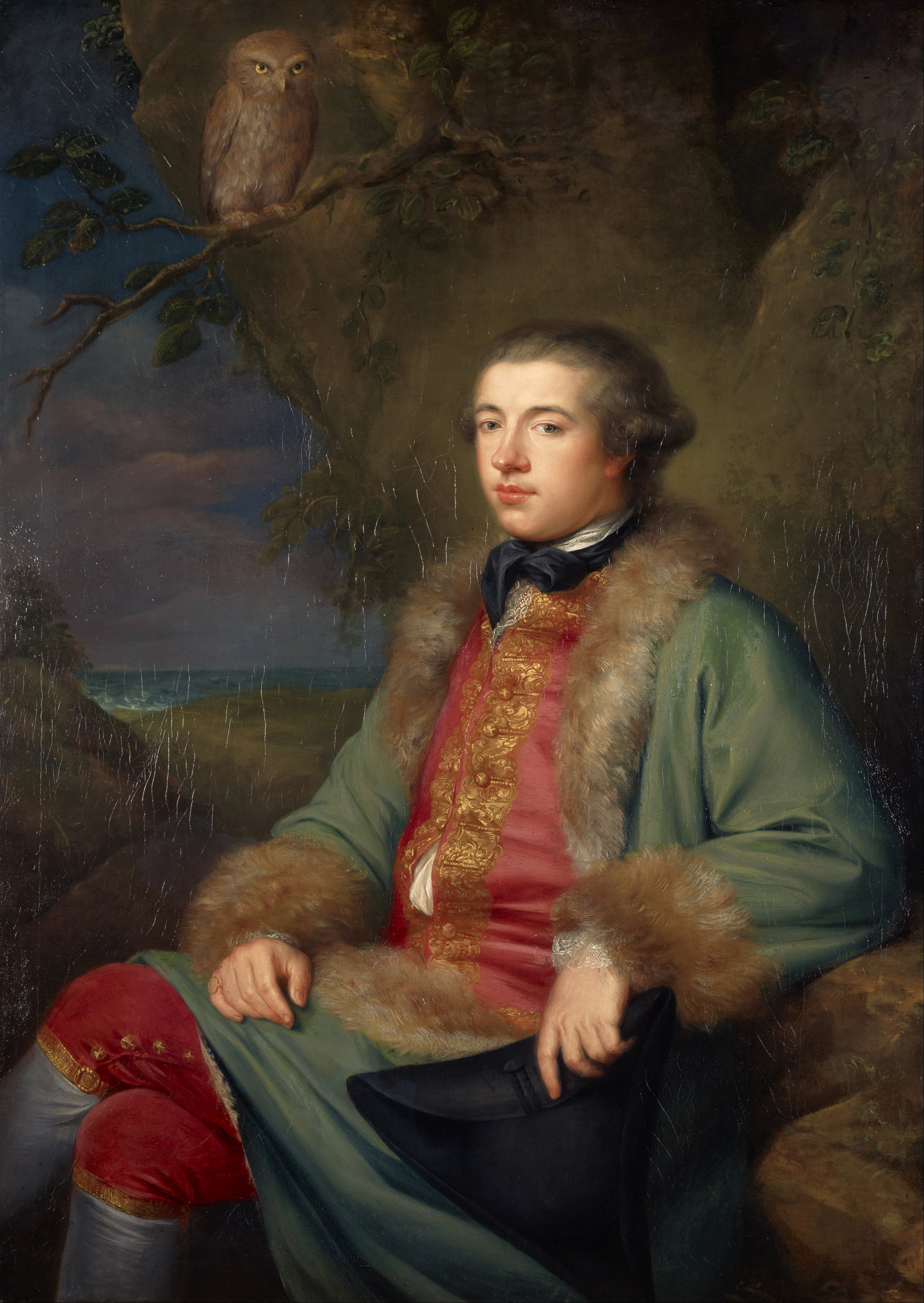
James Boswell at 25, by George Willison

By 1762, however, Johnson had gained notoriety for his dilatoriness in writing; the contemporary poet Churchill teased Johnson for the delay in producing his long-promised edition of Shakespeare: "He for subscribers baits his hook / and takes your cash, but where's the book?" The comments soon motivated Johnson to finish his Shakespeare, and, after receiving the first payment from a government pension on 20 July 1762, he was able to dedicate most of his time towards this goal. Earlier that July, the 24-year-old King George III granted Johnson an annual pension of £300 in appreciation for the Dictionary. While the pension did not make Johnson wealthy, it did allow him a modest yet comfortable independence for the remaining 22 years of his life. The award came largely through the efforts of Sheridan and the Earl of Bute. When Johnson questioned if the pension would force him to promote a political agenda or support various officials, he was told by Bute that the pension "is not given you for anything you are to do, but for what you have done".

On 16 May 1763, Johnson first met 22-year-old James Boswell—who would later become Johnson's first major biographer—in the bookshop of Johnson's friend, Tom Davies. They quickly became friends, although Boswell would return to his home in Scotland or travel abroad for months at a time. Around the spring of 1763, Johnson formed "The Club", a social group that included his friends Reynolds, Burke, Garrick, Goldsmith and others (the membership later expanded to include Adam Smith and Edward Gibbon, in addition to Boswell himself). They decided to meet every Monday at 7:00 pm at the Turk's Head in Gerrard Street, Soho, and these meetings continued until long after the deaths of the original members.

On 9 January 1765, Murphy introduced Johnson to Henry Thrale, a wealthy brewer and MP, and his wife Hester. They struck up an instant friendship; Johnson was treated as a member of the family, and was once more motivated to continue working on his Shakespeare. Afterwards, Johnson stayed with the Thrales for 17 years until Henry's death in 1781, sometimes staying in rooms at Thrale's Anchor Brewery in Southwark. Hester Thrale's documentation of Johnson's life during this time, in her correspondence and her diary (Thraliana), became an important source of biographical information on Johnson after his death.

During the whole of the interview, Johnson talked to his Majesty with profound respect, but still in his firm manly manner, with a sonorous voice, and never in that subdued tone which is commonly used at the levee and in the drawing-room. After the King withdrew, Johnson shewed himself highly pleased with his Majesty's conversation and gracious behaviour. He said to Mr Barnard, "Sir, they may talk of the King as they will; but he is the finest gentleman I have ever seen."

— Boswell's Life of Samuel Johnson

Johnson's edition of Shakespeare was finally published on 10 October 1765 as The Plays of William Shakespeare, in Eight Volumes ... To which are added Notes by Sam. Johnson in a printing of one thousand copies. The first edition quickly sold out, and a second was soon printed. The plays themselves were in a version that Johnson felt was closest to the original, based on his analysis of the manuscript editions. Johnson's revolutionary innovation was to create a set of corresponding notes that allowed readers to clarify the meaning behind many of Shakespeare's more complicated passages, and to examine those which had been transcribed incorrectly in previous editions. Included within the notes are occasional attacks upon rival editors of Shakespeare's works. Years later, Edmond Malone, an important Shakespearean scholar and friend of Johnson's, stated that Johnson's "vigorous and comprehensive understanding threw more light on his authour [sic] than all his predecessors had done".

=== Final works ===
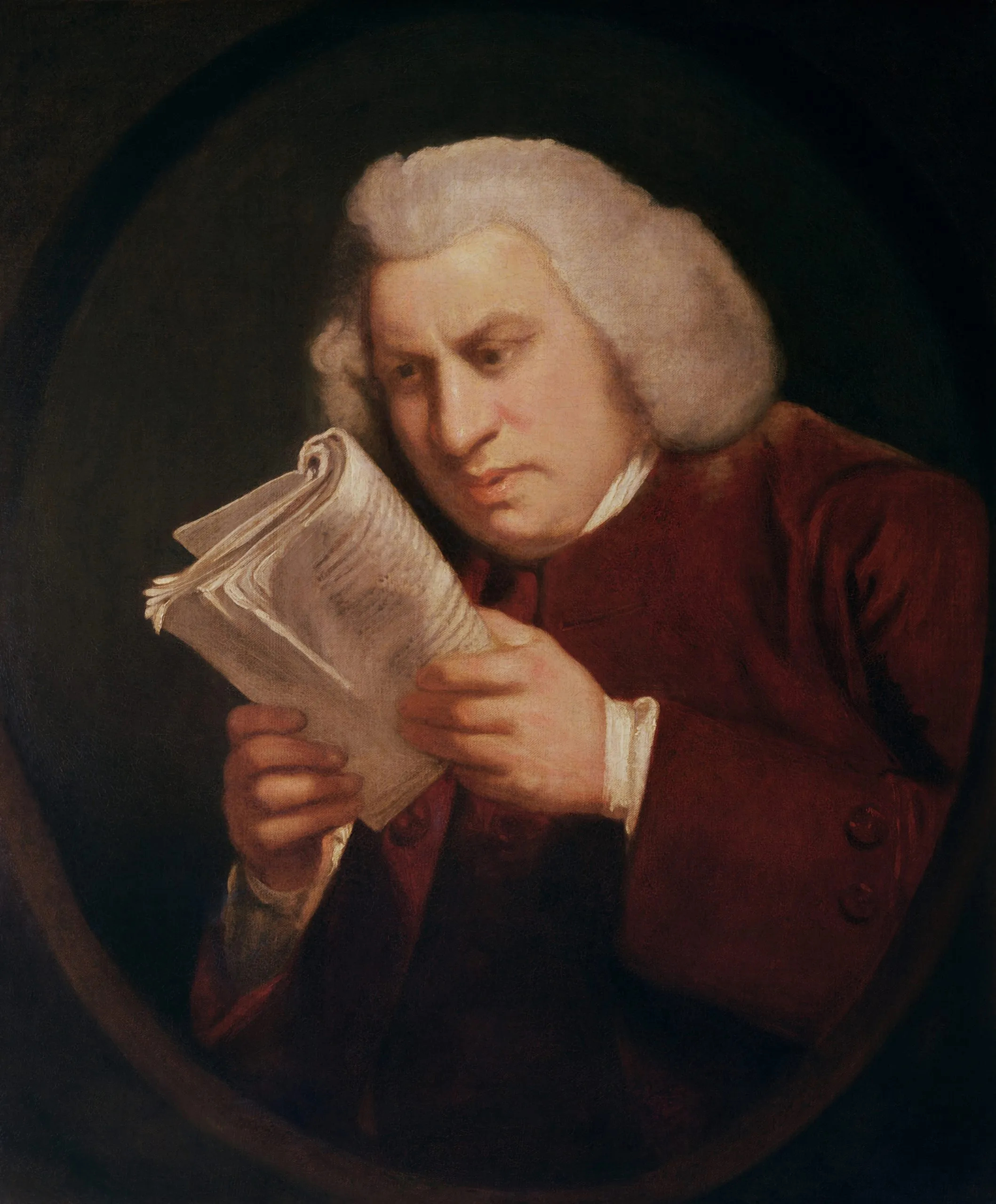
Johnson (1775) showing his intense concentration and the weakness of his eyes; he did not want to be depicted as "Blinking Sam". This unique portrait showing his nearsightedness is in the Huntington Library in San Marino, California.

On 6 August 1773, eleven years after first meeting Boswell, Johnson set out to visit his friend in Scotland, and to begin "a journey to the western islands of Scotland", as Johnson's 1775 account of their travels would put it. That account was intended to discuss the social problems and struggles that affected the Scottish people, but it also praised many of the unique facets of Scottish society, such as a school in Edinburgh for the deaf and mute. Also, Johnson used the work to enter into the dispute over the authenticity of James Macpherson's Ossian poems, claiming they could not have been translations of ancient Scottish literature on the grounds that "in those times nothing had been written in the Earse [i.e. Scots Gaelic] language". There were heated exchanges between the two, and according to one of Johnson's letters, MacPherson threatened physical violence. Boswell's account of their journey, The Journal of a Tour to the Hebrides (1786), was a preliminary step toward his later biography, The Life of Samuel Johnson. Included were various quotations and descriptions of events, including anecdotes such as Johnson swinging a broadsword while wearing Scottish garb, or dancing a Highland jig.

In the 1770s, Johnson, who had tended to be an opponent of the government early in life, published a series of pamphlets in favour of various government policies. In 1770 he produced The False Alarm, a political pamphlet attacking John Wilkes. In 1771, his Thoughts on the Late Transactions Respecting Falkland's Islands cautioned against war with Spain. In 1774 he printed The Patriot, a critique of what he viewed as false patriotism. On the evening of 7 April 1775, he made the famous statement, "Patriotism is the last refuge of a scoundrel." This line was not, as widely believed, about patriotism in general, but what Johnson considered to be the false use of the term "patriotism" by Wilkes and his supporters. Johnson opposed "self-professed Patriots" in general, but valued what he considered "true" patriotism.

The last of these pamphlets, Taxation No Tyranny (1775), was a defence of the Coercive Acts and a response to the Declaration and Resolves of the First Continental Congress, which protested against taxation without representation. Johnson argued that in emigrating to America, colonists had "voluntarily resigned the power of voting", but still retained virtual representation in Parliament. He also criticised the proslavery positions and ownership of slaves by the American Patriots, writing that if "slavery be thus fatally contagious, how is it that we hear the loudest yelps for liberty among the drivers of negroes?"" Johnson argued that colonists who wished to participate in Parliament should move to England and purchase an estate. He denounced British supporters of the Patriot cause as "traitors to this country" and hoped that the matter would be settled without bloodshed, but felt confident that it would ultimately end with "English superiority and American obedience". Years before, Johnson had stated that the French and Indian War was a conflict between "two robbers" of Native American lands, and that neither side deserved to live there. After the signing of the 1783 Treaty of Paris, marking the colonies' independence from Britain as the United States, Johnson stated that he was "deeply disturbed" with the "state of this kingdom".

Mr Thrale's death was a very essential loss to Johnson, who, although he did not foresee all that afterwards happened, was sufficiently convinced that the comforts which Mr Thrale's family afforded him, would now in great measure cease.

— Boswell's Life of Samuel Johnson

On 3 May 1777, while Johnson was trying and failing to save Reverend William Dodd from execution for forgery, he wrote to Boswell that he was busy preparing a "little Lives" and "little Prefaces, to a little edition of the English Poets". Tom Davies, William Strahan and Thomas Cadell had asked Johnson to create this final major work, the Lives of the English Poets, for which he asked 200 guineas, an amount significantly less than the price he could have demanded. The Lives, which were critical as well as biographical studies, appeared as prefaces to selections of each poet's work, and they were longer and more detailed than originally expected. The work was finished in March 1781 and the whole collection was published in six volumes. As Johnson justified in the advertisement for the work, "my purpose was only to have allotted to every Poet an Advertisement, like those which we find in the French Miscellanies, containing a few dates and a general character."

Johnson was unable to enjoy this success because Henry Thrale, the dear friend with whom he lived, died on 4 April 1781. Life changed quickly for Johnson when Hester Thrale became romantically involved with the Italian singing teacher Gabriel Mario Piozzi, which forced Johnson to change his previous lifestyle. After returning home and then travelling for a short period, Johnson received word that his friend and tenant Robert Levet, had died on 17 January 1782. Johnson was shocked by the death of Levet, who had resided at Johnson's London home since 1762. Shortly afterwards Johnson caught a cold that developed into bronchitis and lasted for several months. His health was further complicated by "feeling forlorn and lonely" over Levet's death, and by the deaths of his friend Thomas Lawrence and his housekeeper Williams.

=== Final years ===
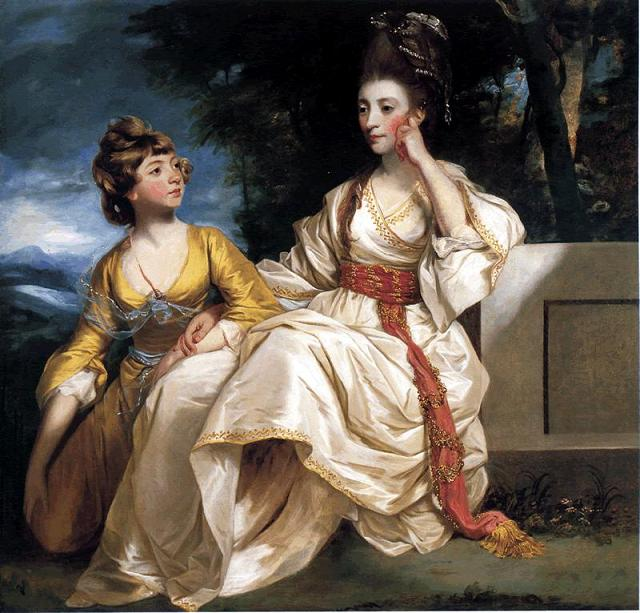
Hester Thrale and her daughter Queeney

Although he had recovered his health by August, Johnson experienced emotional trauma when he was given word that Hester Thrale would sell the residence that Johnson shared with the family. What hurt Johnson most was the possibility that he would be left without her constant company. Months later, on 6 October 1782, Johnson attended church for the final time in his life, to say goodbye to his former residence and life. The walk to the church strained him, but he managed the journey unaccompanied. While there, he wrote a prayer for the Thrale family:

To thy fatherly protection, O Lord, I commend this family. Bless, guide, and defend them, that they may pass through this world, as finally to enjoy in thy presence everlasting happiness, for Jesus Christ's sake. Amen.

Hester Thrale did not completely abandon Johnson, and asked him to accompany the family on a trip to Brighton. He agreed, and was with them from 7 October to 20 November 1782. On his return, his health began to fail, and he was left alone after Boswell's visit on 29 May 1783.

On 17 June 1783, Johnson's poor circulation resulted in a stroke and he wrote to his neighbour, Edmund Allen, that he had lost the ability to speak. Two doctors were brought in to aid Johnson; he regained his ability to speak two days later. Johnson feared that he was dying, and wrote:

The black dog I hope always to resist, and in time to drive, though I am deprived of almost all those that used to help me. The neighbourhood is impoverished. I had once Richardson and Lawrence in my reach. Mrs. Allen is dead. My house has lost Levet, a man who took interest in everything, and therefore ready at conversation. Mrs. Williams is so weak that she can be a companion no longer. When I rise my breakfast is solitary, the black dog waits to share it, from breakfast to dinner he continues barking, except that Dr. Brocklesby for a little keeps him at a distance. Dinner with a sick woman you may venture to suppose not much better than solitary. After dinner, what remains but to count the clock, and hope for that sleep which I can scarce expect. Night comes at last, and some hours of restlessness and confusion bring me again to a day of solitude. What shall exclude the black dog from an habitation like this?

By this time he was sick and gout-ridden. He had surgery for gout, and his remaining friends, including novelist Fanny Burney (the daughter of Charles Burney), came to keep him company. He was confined to his room from 14 December 1783 to 21 April 1784.

A few days before his death, he had asked Sir John Hawkins, one of his executors, where he should be buried; and on being answered, "Doubtless, in Westminster Abbey," seemed to feel a satisfaction, very natural to a Poet.

— Boswell's Life of Samuel Johnson

His health began to improve by May 1784, and he travelled to Oxford with Boswell on 5 May 1784. By July, many of Johnson's friends were either dead or gone; Boswell had left for Scotland and Hester Thrale had become engaged to Piozzi. With no one to visit, Johnson expressed a desire to die in London and arrived there on 16 November 1784. On 25 November 1784, he allowed Burney to visit him and expressed an interest to her that he should leave London; he soon left for Islington, to George Strahan's home. His final moments were filled with mental anguish and delusions; when his physician, Thomas Warren, visited and asked him if he were feeling better, Johnson burst out with: "No, Sir; you cannot conceive with what acceleration I advance towards death."

Many visitors came to see Johnson as he lay sick in bed, but he preferred only Langton's company. Burney waited for word of Johnson's condition, along with Windham, Strahan, Hoole, Cruikshank, Des Moulins and Barber. On 13 December 1784, Johnson met with two others: a young woman, Miss Morris, whom Johnson blessed, and Francesco Sastres, an Italian teacher, who heard some of Johnson's final words: "iam moriturus" ("now [I am] about to die"). Shortly afterwards he fell into a coma, and died at 7:00 pm.

Langton waited until 11:00 pm to tell the others, which led to John Hawkins' becoming pale and overcome with "an agony of mind", along with Seward and Hoole describing Johnson's death as "the most awful sight". Boswell remarked, "My feeling was just one large expanse of Stupor ... I could not believe it. My imagination was not convinced." William Gerard Hamilton joined in and stated, "He has made a chasm, which not only nothing can fill up, but which nothing has a tendency to fill up. –Johnson is dead.– Let us go to the next best: There is nobody; –no man can be said to put you in mind of Johnson."

He was buried on 20 December 1784 at Westminster Abbey with an inscription that reads:

Samuel Johnson, LL.D.
Obiit XIII die Decembris,
Anno Domini
M.DCC.LXXXIV.
Ætatis suœ LXXV.

== Literary criticism ==
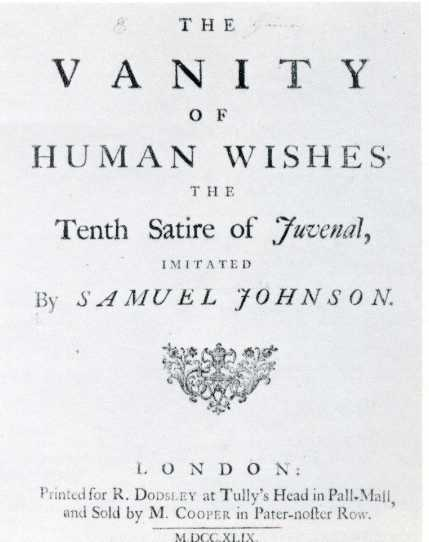
The Vanity of Human Wishes (1749) title page

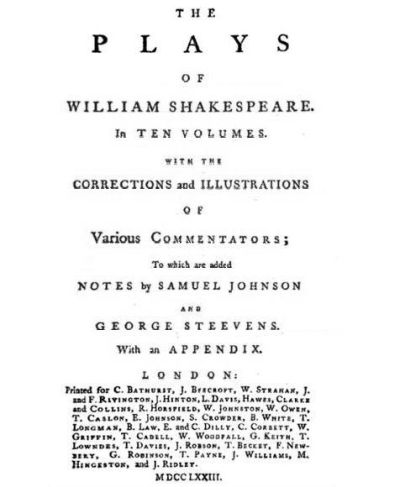
Plays of William Shakespeare (1773 expanded edition) title page

Johnson's works, especially his Lives of the Poets series, describe various features of excellent writing. He believed that the best poetry relied on contemporary language, and he disliked the use of decorative or purposely archaic language. He was suspicious of the poetic language used by Milton, whose blank verse he believed would inspire many bad imitations. Also, Johnson opposed the poetic language of his contemporary Thomas Gray. His greatest complaint was that obscure allusions found in works like Milton's Lycidas were overused; he preferred poetry that could be easily read and understood. In addition to his views on language, Johnson believed that a good poem incorporated new and unique imagery.

In his smaller poetic works, Johnson relied on short lines and filled his work with a feeling of empathy, which possibly influenced Housman's poetic style. In London, his first imitation of Juvenal, Johnson uses the poetic form to express his political opinion and approaches the topic in a playful and almost joyous manner. However, his second imitation, The Vanity of Human Wishes, is completely different; the language remains simple, but the poem is more complicated and difficult to read because Johnson is trying to describe complex Christian ethics. These Christian values are not unique to the poem, but contain views expressed in most of Johnson's works. In particular, Johnson emphasises God's infinite love and argues that happiness can be attained through virtuous action.

When it came to biography, Johnson disagreed with Plutarch's use of biography to praise and to teach morality. Instead, Johnson believed in portraying the biographical subjects accurately and including any negative aspects of their lives. Because his insistence on accuracy in biography was little short of revolutionary, Johnson had to struggle against a society that was unwilling to accept biographical details that could be viewed as tarnishing a reputation; this became the subject of Rambler 60. Furthermore, Johnson believed that biography should not be limited to the most famous and that the lives of lesser individuals, too, were significant; thus in his Lives of the Poets he chose both great and lesser poets. In all his biographies he insisted on including what others would have considered trivial details to fully describe the lives of his subjects. Johnson considered the genre of autobiography and diaries, including his own, as one having the most significance; in Idler 84 he writes that a writer of an autobiography would be the least likely to distort his own life.

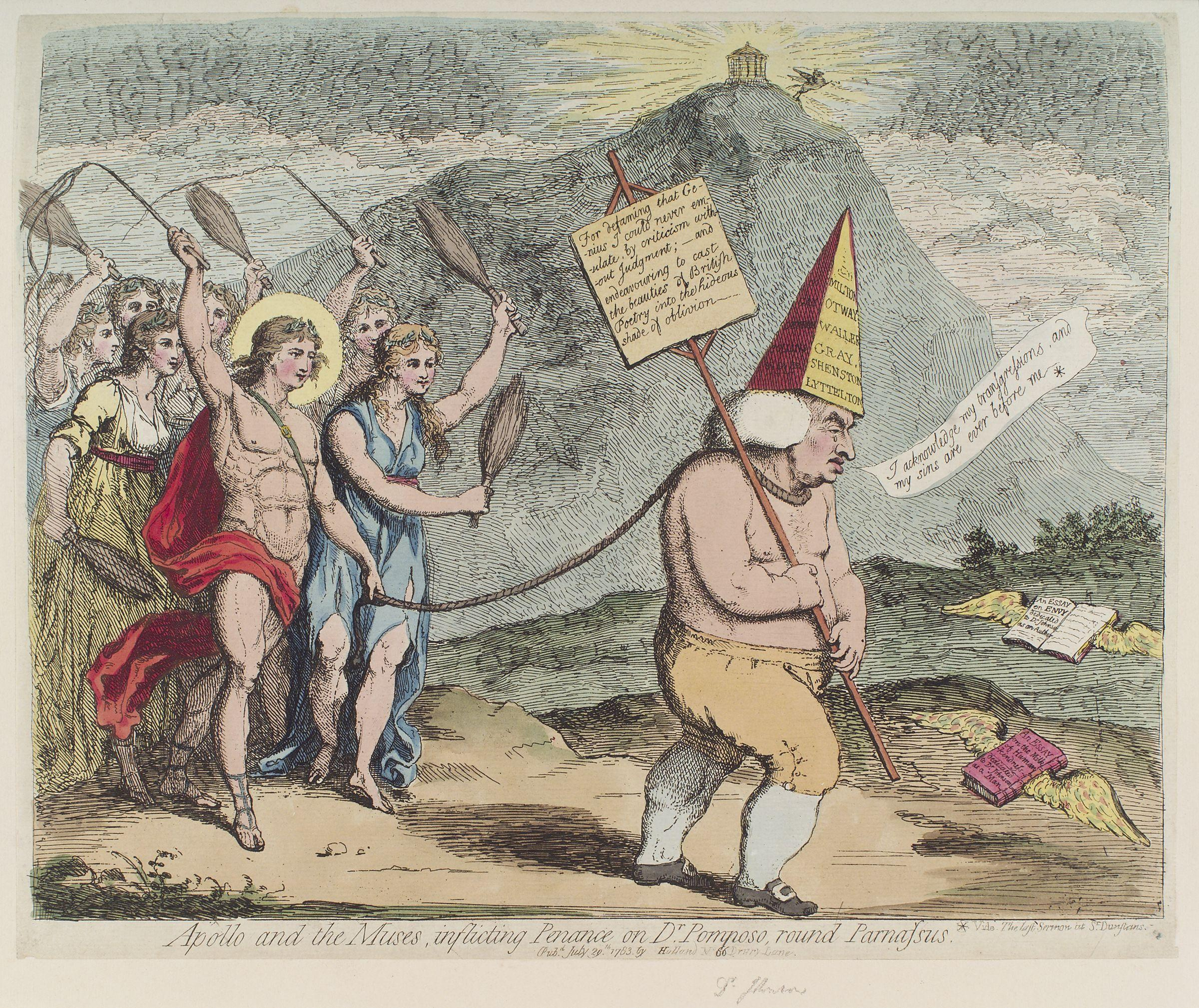
A caricature of Johnson by James Gillray mocking him for his literary criticism. He is shown doing penance for Apollo and the Muses with Mount Parnassus in the background.

Johnson's thoughts on biography and on poetry coalesced in his understanding of what would make a good critic. His works were dominated with his intent to use them for literary criticism. This was especially true of his Dictionary of which he wrote: "I lately published a Dictionary like those compiled by the academies of Italy and France, for the use of such as aspire to exactness of criticism, or elegance of style". Although a smaller edition became the household standard, Johnson's original Dictionary was an academic tool that examined how words were used, especially in literary works. To achieve this purpose, Johnson included quotations from Bacon, Hooker, Milton, Shakespeare, Spenser, and many others from what he considered to be the most important literary fields: natural science, philosophy, poetry, and theology. These quotations and usages were all compared and carefully studied in the Dictionary so that a reader could understand what words in literary works meant in context.

Johnson did not attempt to create schools of theories to analyse the aesthetics of literature. Instead, he used his criticism for the practical purpose of helping others to better read and understand literature. When it came to Shakespeare's plays, Johnson emphasised the role of the reader in understanding language: "If Shakespeare has difficulties above other writers, it is to be imputed to the nature of his work, which required the use of common colloquial language, and consequently admitted many phrases allusive, elliptical, and proverbial, such as we speak and hear every hour without observing them".

His works on Shakespeare were devoted not merely to Shakespeare, but to understanding literature as a whole; in his Preface to Shakespeare, Johnson rejects the previous dogma of the classical unities and argues that drama should be faithful to life. However, Johnson did not only defend Shakespeare; he discussed Shakespeare's faults, including what he saw as lack of morality, vulgarity, carelessness in crafting plots, and occasional inattentiveness when choosing words or word order. As well as direct literary criticism, Johnson emphasised the need to establish a text that accurately reflects what an author wrote. Shakespeare's plays, in particular, had multiple editions, each of which contained errors caused by the printing process. This problem was compounded by careless editors who deemed difficult words incorrect, and changed them in later editions. Johnson believed that an editor should not alter the text in such a way.

== Views and character ==
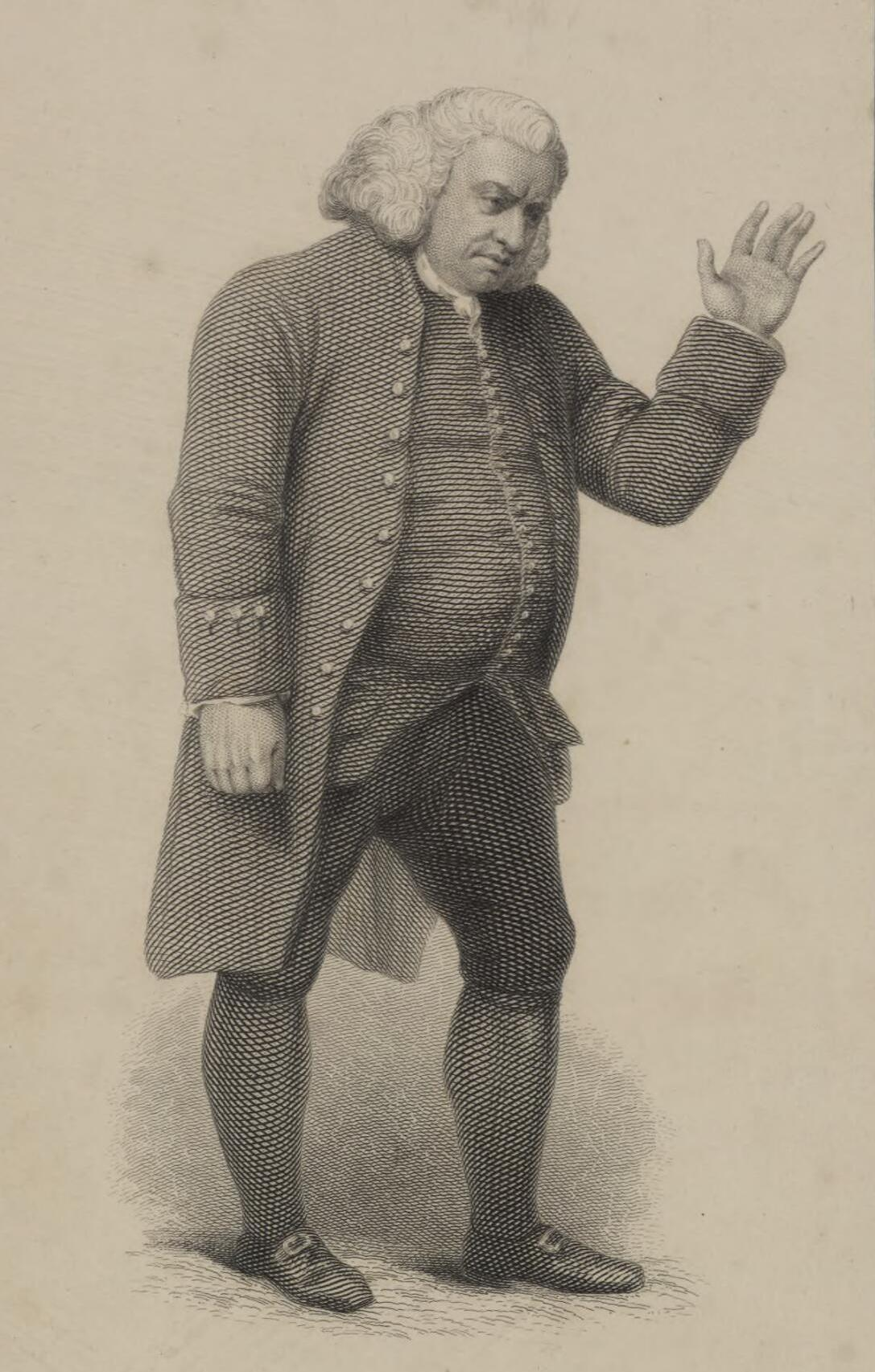
Portrait of Samuel Johnson 1770

Johnson's tall (Note: Johnson was 180 cm (5 ft 11 in) tall when the average height of an Englishman was 165 cm (5 ft 5 in)) and robust figure combined with his odd gestures were confusing to some; when William Hogarth first saw Johnson standing near a window in Richardson's house, "shaking his head and rolling himself about in a strange ridiculous manner", Hogarth thought Johnson an "ideot, whom his relations had put under the care of Mr. Richardson". Hogarth was quite surprised when "this figure stalked forwards to where he and Mr. Richardson were sitting and all at once took up the argument ... [with] such a power of eloquence, that Hogarth looked at him with astonishment, and actually imagined that this ideot had been at the moment inspired".

Beyond appearance, Adam Smith claimed that "Johnson knew more books than any man alive", while Edmund Burke thought that if Johnson were to join Parliament, he "certainly would have been the greatest speaker that ever was there". Johnson relied on a unique form of rhetoric, and he is well known for his "refutation" of Bishop Berkeley's immaterialism, his claim that matter did not actually exist but only seemed to exist: during a conversation with Boswell, Johnson powerfully stomped a nearby stone and proclaimed of Berkeley's theory, "I refute it thus!"

Johnson was a devout, conservative Anglican and a compassionate man who supported a number of poor friends under his own roof, even when unable to provide for himself fully. Johnson's Christian morality permeated his works, and he would write on moral topics with such authority and in such a trusting manner that, Walter Jackson Bate claims, "no other moralist in history excels or even begins to rival him". However, as Donald Greene points out, Johnson's moral writings do not contain "a predetermined and authorized pattern of 'good behavior'", even though Johnson does emphasise certain kinds of conduct.

After we came out of the church, we stood talking for some time together of Bishop Berkeley's ingenious sophistry to prove the non-existence of matter, and that every thing in the universe is merely ideal. I observed, that though we are satisfied his doctrine is not true, it is impossible to refute it. I never shall forget the alacrity with which Johnson answered, striking his foot with mighty force against a large stone, till he rebounded from it, "I refute it thus."

— Boswell's Life of Samuel Johnson

He did not let his own faith prejudice him against others and respected those of other denominations who demonstrated a commitment to Christian beliefs. Although Johnson respected Milton's poetry, he could not tolerate Milton's Puritan and Republican beliefs, feeling that they were contrary to England and Christianity. He was an opponent of slavery on moral grounds, and once proposed a toast to the "next rebellion of the Negroes in the West Indies". Beside his beliefs concerning humanity, Johnson is also known for his love of cats, especially his own two cats, Hodge and Lily. Boswell wrote, "I never shall forget the indulgence with which he treated Hodge, his cat."

Johnson was also known as a staunch Tory; he admitted to sympathies for the Jacobite cause during his younger years but, by the reign of George III, he came to accept the Hanoverian succession. It was Boswell who gave people the impression that Johnson was an "arch-conservative", and it was Boswell, more than anyone else, who determined how Johnson would be seen by people years later. However, Boswell was not around for two of Johnson's most politically active periods: during Walpole's control over British Parliament and during the Seven Years' War. Although Boswell was present with Johnson during the 1770s and describes four major pamphlets written by Johnson, he neglects to discuss them because he is more interested in their travels to Scotland. This is compounded by the fact that Boswell held an opinion contrary to two of these pamphlets, The False Alarm and Taxation No Tyranny, and so attacks Johnson's views in his biography.

In his Life of Samuel Johnson, Boswell referred to Johnson as 'Dr. Johnson' so often that he would always be known by that title, even though Johnson hated being so called. Boswell's emphasis on Johnson's later years shows him too often merely as an old man discoursing in a tavern to a circle of admirers. Although Boswell, a Scotsman, was his close companion and friend, Johnson, like many in England, held hostile anti-Scottish sentiments. During his journey through Scotland with Boswell, Johnson "exhibited prejudice and a narrow nationalism". Hester Thrale, summarising Johnson's views on Scotland, stated "We all know how well he loved to abuse the Scotch, & indeed to be abused by them in return."

== Health and disability ==
Johnson had several health problems, including childhood tuberculous scrofula resulting in deep facial scarring, deafness in one ear, and blindness in one eye, gout, testicular cancer; a stroke in his final year left him unable to speak. His autopsy indicated that he had emphysema, as well as cardiac failure due likely to hypertension, a condition then unknown. Johnson displayed signs consistent with other diagnoses, including depression and what is now known as Tourette syndrome.

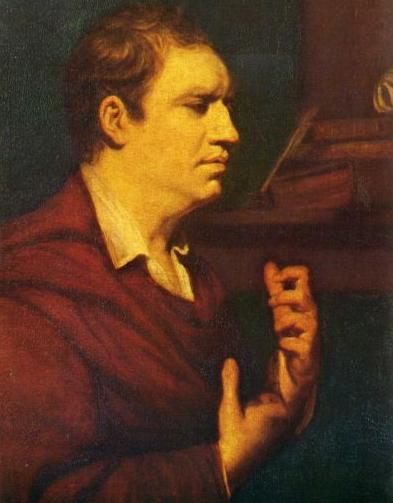
Reynolds' 1769 portrait depicting Johnson's "odd gesticulations".

There are many accounts of Johnson suffering from episodes of depression and what he thought might be madness. As Walter Jackson Bate puts it, "one of the ironies of literary history is that its most compelling and authoritative symbol of common sense—of the strong, imaginative grasp of concrete reality—should have begun his adult life, at the age of twenty, in a state of such intense anxiety and bewildered despair that, at least from his own point of view, it seemed the onset of actual insanity". To overcome these feelings, Johnson tried to involve himself with various activities constantly, but this did not seem to help. Taylor said that Johnson "at one time strongly entertained thoughts of suicide". Boswell claimed that Johnson "felt himself overwhelmed with an horrible melancholia, with perpetual irritation, fretfulness, and impatience; and with a dejection, gloom, and despair, which made existence misery".

Early on, when Johnson was unable to pay off his debts, he began to work with professional writers and identified his own situation with theirs. During this time, Johnson witnessed Christopher Smart's decline into "penury and the madhouse", and feared that he might share the same fate. Hester Thrale Piozzi claimed, in a discussion on Smart's mental state, that Johnson was her "friend who feared an apple should intoxicate him". To her, what separated Johnson from others who were placed in asylums for madness—like Christopher Smart—was his ability to keep his concerns and emotions to himself.

Two hundred years after Johnson's death, the posthumous diagnosis of Tourette syndrome became widely accepted. The condition was unknown during Johnson's lifetime, but Boswell describes Johnson displaying signs of Tourette syndrome, including tics and other involuntary movements. According to Boswell "he commonly held his head to one side ... moving his body backwards and forwards, and rubbing his left knee in the same direction, with the palm of his hand ... [H]e made various sounds" like "a half whistle" or "as if clucking like a hen", and "... all this accompanied sometimes with a thoughtful look, but more frequently with a smile. Generally when he had concluded a period, in the course of a dispute, by which time he was a good deal exhausted by violence and vociferation, he used to blow out his breath like a whale."

There are many similar accounts; in particular, Johnson was said to "perform his gesticulations" at the threshold of a house or in doorways. When asked by a little girl why he made such noises and acted in that way, Johnson responded: "From bad habit." His posthumous diagnosis with the syndrome was first made in a 1967 report, and Tourette syndrome researcher Arthur K. Shapiro described Johnson as "the most notable example of a successful adaptation to life despite the liability of Tourette syndrome". Details provided by the writings of Boswell, Hester Thrale, and others reinforce the diagnosis, with one paper concluding:

[Johnson] also displayed many of the obsessional-compulsive traits and rituals which are associated with this syndrome ... It may be thought that without this illness Dr Johnson's remarkable literary achievements, the great dictionary, his philosophical deliberations and his conversations may never have happened; and Boswell, the author of the greatest of biographies would have been unknown.

== Legacy ==
External videos
- Presentation by Walter Jackson Bate on Samuel Johnson: A Biography, October 18, 1998, C-SPAN

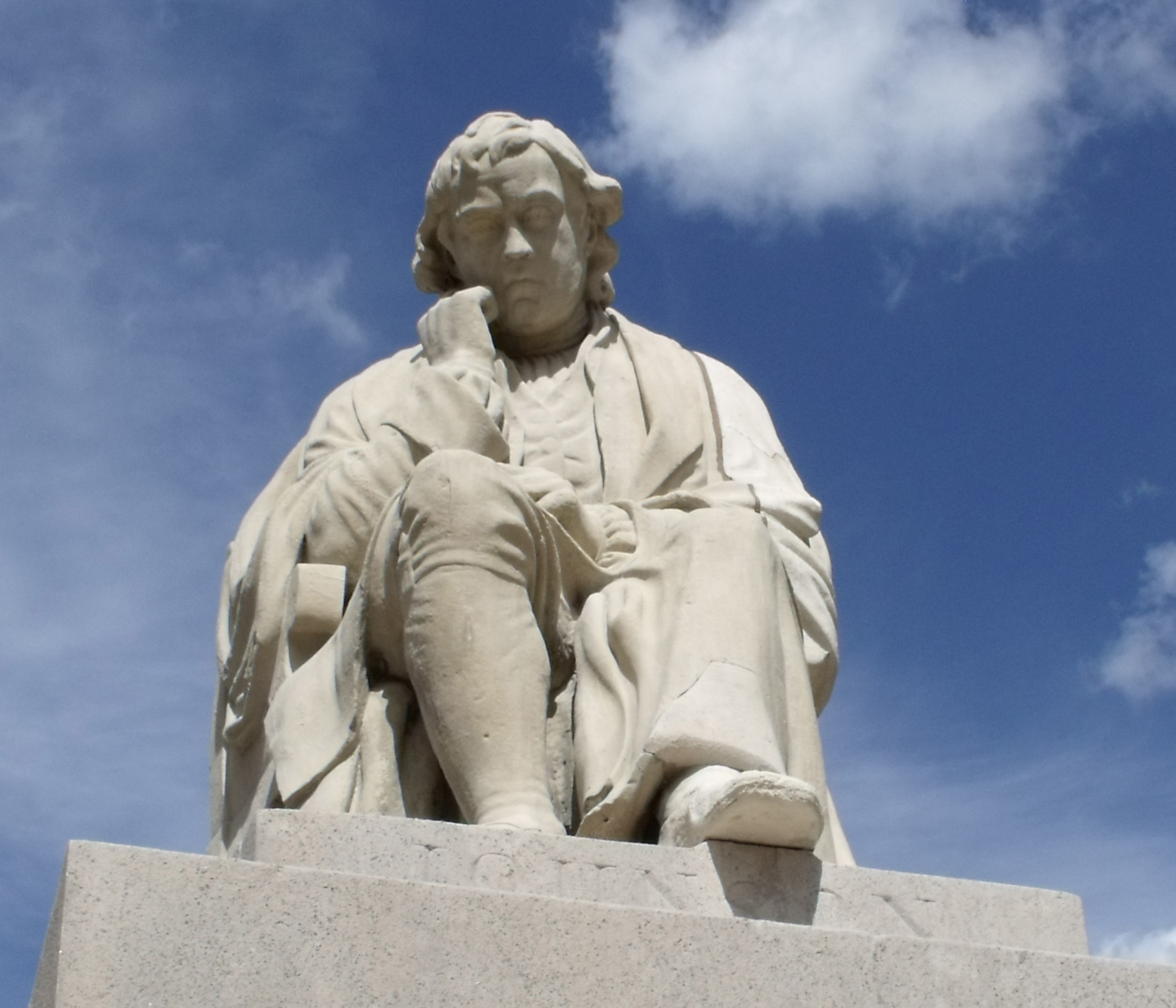
Statue of Dr Johnson erected in 1838 opposite the house where he was born at Lichfield's Market Square. There are also statues of him in London and Uttoxeter.

Johnson was, in the words of Steven Lynn, "more than a well-known writer and scholar"; he was a celebrity, for the activities and the state of his health in his later years were constantly reported in various journals and newspapers, and when there was nothing to report, something was invented. According to Bate, "Johnson loved biography," and he "changed the whole course of biography for the modern world. One by-product was the most famous single work of biographical art in the whole of literature, Boswell's Life of Johnson, and there were many other memoirs and biographies of a similar kind written on Johnson after his death."

These accounts of his life include Thomas Tyers's A Biographical Sketch of Dr Samuel Johnson (1784); Boswell's The Journal of a Tour to the Hebrides (1785); Hester Thrale's Anecdotes of the Late Samuel Johnson, which drew on entries from her diary and other notes; John Hawkins's Life of Samuel Johnson, the first full-length biography of Johnson; and, in 1792, Arthur Murphy's An Essay on the Life and Genius of Samuel Johnson, which replaced Hawkins's biography as the introduction to a collection of Johnson's Works. Another important source was Fanny Burney, who described Johnson as "the acknowledged Head of Literature in this kingdom" and kept a diary containing details missing from other biographies. Above all, Boswell's portrayal of Johnson is the work best known to general readers. Although critics like Donald Greene argue about its status as a true biography, the work became successful as Boswell and his friends promoted it at the expense of the many other works on Johnson's life.

In criticism, Johnson had a lasting influence, although not everyone viewed him favourably. Some, like Macaulay, regarded Johnson as an idiot savant who produced some respectable works, and others, like the Romantic poets, were completely opposed to Johnson's views on poetry and literature, especially with regard to Milton. However, some of their contemporaries disagreed: Stendhal's Racine et Shakespeare is based in part on Johnson's views of Shakespeare, and Johnson influenced Jane Austen's writing style and philosophy. Later, Johnson's works came into favour, and Matthew Arnold, in his Six Chief Lives from Johnson's "Lives of the Poets", considered the Lives of Milton, Dryden, Pope, Addison, Swift, and Gray as "points which stand as so many natural centres, and by returning to which we can always find our way again".

More than a century after his death, literary critics such as G. Birkbeck Hill and T. S. Eliot came to regard Johnson as a serious critic. They began to study Johnson's works with an increasing focus on the critical analysis found in his edition of Shakespeare and Lives of the Poets. Yvor Winters claimed that "A great critic is the rarest of all literary geniuses; perhaps the only critic in English who deserves that epithet is Samuel Johnson". F. R. Leavis agreed and, on Johnson's criticism, said, "When we read him we know, beyond question, that we have here a powerful and distinguished mind operating at first hand upon literature. This, we can say with emphatic conviction, really is criticism". Edmund Wilson claimed that "The Lives of the Poets and the prefaces and commentary on Shakespeare are among the most brilliant and the most acute documents in the whole range of English criticism".

The critic Harold Bloom placed Johnson's work firmly within the Western canon, describing him as "unmatched by any critic in any nation before or after him ... Bate in the finest insight on Johnson I know, emphasised that no other writer is so obsessed by the realisation that the mind is an activity, one that will turn to destructiveness of the self or of others unless it is directed to labour." Johnson's philosophical insistence that the language within literature must be examined became a prevailing mode of literary theory during the mid-20th century.

Half of Johnson's surviving correspondence, together with some of his manuscripts, editions of his books, paintings and other items associated with him are in the Donald and Mary Hyde Collection of Dr. Samuel Johnson, housed at Houghton Library at Harvard University since 2003. The collection includes drafts of his Plan for a Dictionary, documents associated with Hester Thrale Piozzi and James Boswell (including corrected proofs of his Life of Johnson) and a teapot owned by Johnson.

There are many societies formed around and dedicated to the study and enjoyment of Samuel Johnson's life and works. On the bicentennial of Johnson's death in 1984, Oxford University held a week-long conference featuring 50 papers, and the Arts Council of Great Britain held an exhibit of "Johnsonian portraits and other memorabilia". The London Times and Punch produced parodies of Johnson's style for the occasion. In 1999, the BBC Four television channel started the Samuel Johnson Prize, an award for non-fiction. A Royal Society of Arts blue plaque, unveiled in 1876, marks Johnson's Gough Square house. In 2009, Johnson was among the ten people selected by the Royal Mail for their "Eminent Britons" commemorative postage stamp issue. On 18 September 2017 Google commemorated Johnson's 308th birthday with a Google Doodle. The date of his death, 13 December, is commemorated in the Church of England's Calendar of Saints. There is a memorial to him at St Paul's Cathedral in London.

== Major publications ==
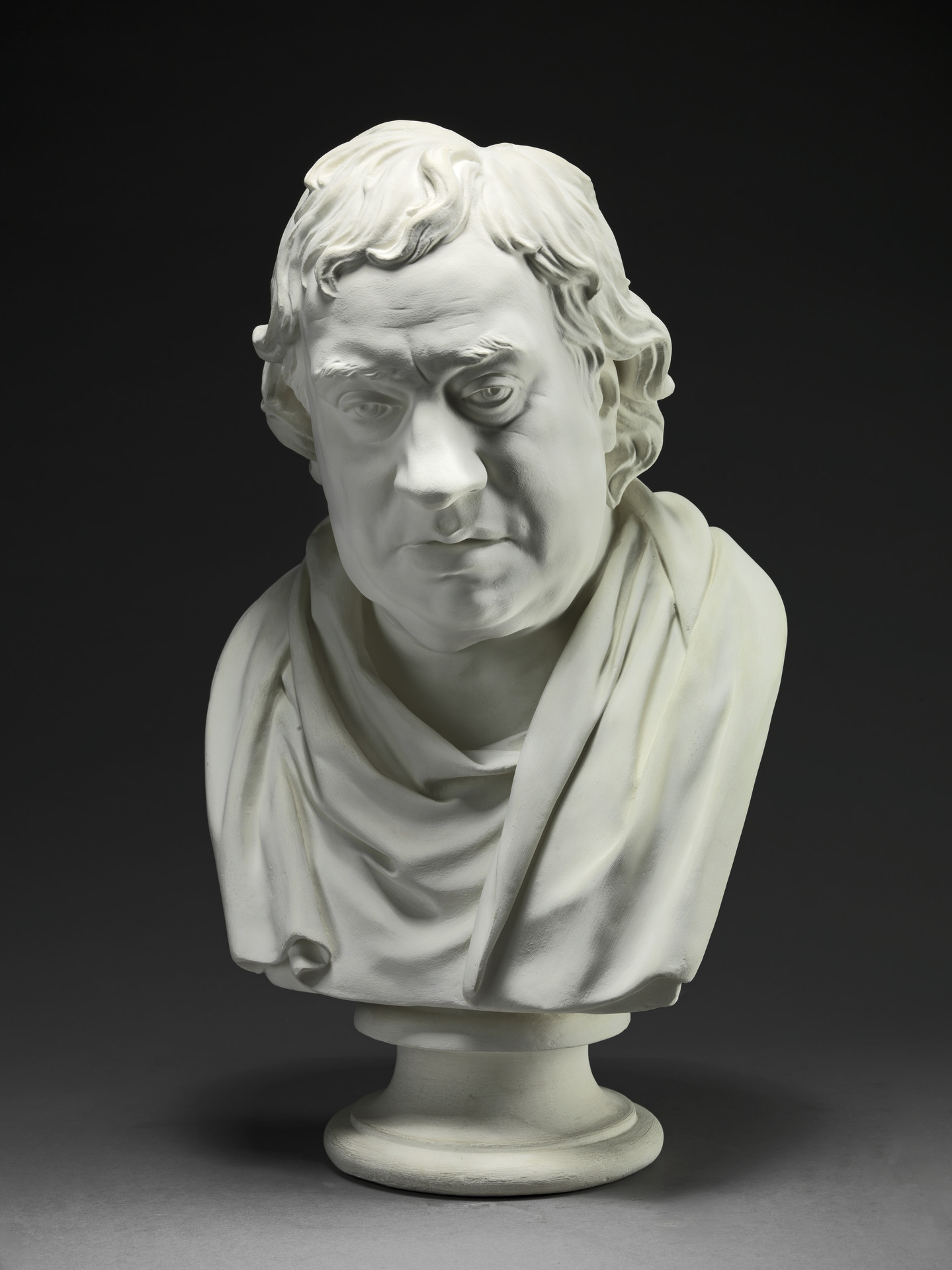
Bust of Johnson by Joseph Nollekens, 1777

=== Essays ===
- Birmingham Journal (1732–33)
- Plan for a Dictionary of the English Language (1747)
- The Rambler (1750–52)
- The Adventurer (1753–54)
- Universal Visiter (1756)
- The Literary Magazine, or Universal Review (1756)
- The Idler (1758–60)
- The False Alarm (1770)
- Thoughts on the Late Transactions Respecting Falkland's Islands (1771)
- The Patriot (1774)
- A Journey to the Western Islands of Scotland (1775)
- Taxation no Tyranny (1775)
- The Beauties of Johnson (1781)

=== Poetry ===
- Messiah (1728), a translation into Latin of Alexander Pope's Messiah
- London (1738)
- Prologue at the Opening of the Theatre in Drury Lane (1747)
- The Vanity of Human Wishes (1749)
- Irene, a Tragedy (1749)

=== Translation ===
- A Voyage to Abyssinia (1735), by Jerome Lobo, translated from the French

=== Biographies and criticism ===
- Life of Mr Richard Savage (1744)
- Miscellaneous Observations on the Tragedy of Macbeth (1745)
- "Life of Browne" (1756) in Thomas Browne's Christian Morals
- Proposals for Printing, by Subscription, the Dramatick Works of William Shakespeare (1756)
- Preface to the Plays of William Shakespeare (1765)
- The Plays of William Shakespeare (1765)
- Lives of the Poets (1779–81)

=== Dictionaries ===
- Preface to a Dictionary of the English Language (1755)
- A Dictionary of the English Language (1755)

=== Novella ===
- The History of Rasselas, Prince of Abissinia (1759)

== Footnotes ==
=== References ===
- Ammerman, David (1974), In the Common Cause: American Response to the Coercive Acts of 1774, New York: Norton, ISBN 978-0-393-00787-9
- Arnold, Matthew (1972), Ricks, Christopher (ed.), Selected Criticism of Matthew Arnold, New York: New American Library, OCLC 6338231
- Bate, Walter Jackson (1977), Samuel Johnson, New York: Harcourt Brace Jovanovich, ISBN 978-0-15-179260-3
- Bate, Walter Jackson (1955), The Achievement of Samuel Johnson, Oxford: Oxford University Press, OCLC 355413
- Bloom, Harold (1998), "Hester Thrale Piozzi 1741–1821", in Bloom, Harold (ed.), Women Memoirists Vol. II, Philadelphia: Chelsea House, pp. 74–76, ISBN 978-0-7910-4655-5
- Bloom, Harold (1995), The Western Canon, London: Macmillan, ISBN 978-0-333-64813-1
- Boswell, James (1969), Waingrow, Marshall (ed.), Correspondence and Other Papers of James Boswell Relating to the Making of the Life of Johnson, New York: McGraw-Hill, OCLC 59269
- Boswell, James (1986), Hibbert, Christopher (ed.), The Life of Samuel Johnson, New York: Penguin Classics, ISBN 978-0-14-043116-2
- Clarke, Norma (2000), Dr Johnson's Women, London: Hambledon, ISBN 978-1-85285-254-2
- Clingham, Greg (1997), "Life and literature in the Lives", in Clingham, Greg (ed.), The Cambridge companion to Samuel Johnson, Cambridge: Cambridge University Press, pp. 161–191, ISBN 978-0-521-55625-5
- Davis, Bertram (1961), "Introduction", in Davis, Bertram (ed.), The Life of Samuel Johnson, LL.D, New York: Macmillan Company, pp. vii–xxx, OCLC 739445
- DeMaria, Robert Jr. (1994), The Life of Samuel Johnson, Oxford: Blackwell, ISBN 978-1-55786-664-6
- Greene, Donald (1989), Samuel Johnson: Updated Edition, Boston: Twayne Publishers, ISBN 978-0-8057-6962-3
- Greene, Donald (2000), "Introduction", in Greene, Donald (ed.), Political Writings, Indianapolis: Liberty Fund, ISBN 978-0-86597-275-9
- Griffin, Dustin (2005), Patriotism and Poetry in Eighteenth-Century Britain, Cambridge: Cambridge University Press, ISBN 978-0-521-00959-1
- Grundy, Isobel (1997), "Jane Austen and literary traditions", in Copeland, Edward; McMaster, Juliet (eds.), The Cambridge companion to Jane Austen, Cambridge: Cambridge University Press, pp. 189–210, ISBN 978-0-521-49867-8
- Hawkins, John (1787), Life of Samuel Johnson, LL.D, London: J. Buckland, OCLC 173965
- Hibbert, Christopher (1971), The Personal History of Samuel Johnson, New York: Harper & Row, ISBN 978-0-06-011879-2
- Hitchings, Henry (2005), Defining the World: The Extraordinary Story of Dr Johnson's Dictionary, New York: Picador, ISBN 0-374-11302-5
- Hill, G. Birkbeck, ed. (1897), Johnsonian Miscellanies, London: Oxford Clarendon Press, OCLC 61906024
- Hopewell, Sydney (1950), The Book of Bosworth School, 1320–1920, Leicester: W. Thornley & Son, OCLC 6808364
- Johnson, Samuel (1970), Chapman, R. W. (ed.), Johnson's Journey to the Western Islands of Scotland and Boswell's Journal of a Tour to the Hebrides, Oxford: Oxford University Press, ISBN 978-0-19-281072-4
- Keymer, Thomas (1999), "Johnson, Madness, and Smart", in Hawes, Clement (ed.), Christopher Smart and the Enlightenment, New York, NY: St. Martin's Press, ISBN 978-0-312-21369-5
- Lane, Margaret (1975), Samuel Johnson & his World, New York: Harper & Row Publishers, ISBN 978-0-06-012496-0
- Lynch, Jack (2003), "Introduction to this Edition", in Lynch, Jack (ed.), Samuel Johnson's Dictionary, New York: Walker & Co, pp. 1–21, ISBN 978-0-8027-1421-3
- Lynn, Steven (1997), "Johnson's critical reception", in Clingham, Greg (ed.), Cambridge Companion to Samuel Johnson, Cambridge: Cambridge University Press, ISBN 978-0-521-55625-5
- Martin, Peter (2008), Samuel Johnson:A Biography, Cambridge, Massachusetts: Belknap Press, ISBN 978-0-674-03160-9
- McHenry, LC Jr (April 1967), "Samuel Johnson's tics and gesticulations", Journal of the History of Medicine and Allied Sciences, 22 (2): 152–168, doi:10.1093/jhmas/XXII.2.152, PMID 5341871
- Meyers, J (2008), Samuel Johnson: The Struggle, Basic Books, A Member of the Perseus Books Group, ISBN 978-0-465-04571-6
- Murray, TJ (16 June 1979), "Dr Samuel Johnson's movement disorder", British Medical Journal, vol. 1, no. 6178, pp. 1610–1614, doi:10.1136/bmj.1.6178.1610, PMC 1599158, PMID 380753
- Needham, John (1982), The Completest Mode, Edinburgh: Edinburgh University Press, ISBN 978-0-85224-387-9
- Pearce, JMS (July 1994), "Doctor Samuel Johnson: 'the Great Convulsionary' a victim of Gilles de la Tourette's syndrome", Journal of the Royal Society of Medicine, 87 (7): 396–399, doi:10.1177/014107689408700709, PMC 1294650, PMID 8046726
- Piozzi, Hester (1951), Balderson, Katharine (ed.), Thraliana: The Diary of Mrs. Hester Lynch Thrale (Later Mrs. Piozzi) 1776–1809, Oxford: Clarendon, OCLC 359617
- Pittock, Murray (2004), "Johnson, Boswell, and their circle", in Keymer, Thomas; Mee, Jon (eds.), The Cambridge companion to English literature from 1740 to 1830, Cambridge: Cambridge University Press, pp. 157–172, ISBN 978-0-521-00757-3
- Rogers, Pat (1995), Johnson and Boswell: The Transit of Caledonia, Oxford: Oxford University Press, ISBN 978-0-19-818259-7
- Shapiro, Arthur K (1978), Gilles de la Tourette syndrome, New York: Raven Press, ISBN 978-0-89004-057-7
- Skargon, Yvonne (1999), The Importance of Being Oscar: Lily and Hodge and Dr. Johnson, London: Primrose Academy, OCLC 56542613
- Stern, JS; Burza, S; Robertson, MM (January 2005), "Gilles de la Tourette's syndrome and its impact in the UK", Postgrad Med J, 81 (951): 12–19, doi:10.1136/pgmj.2004.023614, PMC 1743178, PMID 15640424, "It is now widely accepted that Dr Samuel Johnson had Tourette's syndrome"
- Wain, John (1974), Samuel Johnson, New York: Viking Press, OCLC 40318001
- Watkins, WBC (1960), Perilous Balance: The Tragic Genius of Swift, Johnson, and Sterne, Cambridge, MA: Walker-deBerry, Inc., OCLC 40318001
- Weinbrot, Howard D. (1997), "Johnson's Poetry", in Clingham, Greg (ed.), Cambridge Companion to Samuel Johnson, Cambridge: Cambridge University Press, ISBN 978-0-521-55625-5
- Wilson, Edmund (1950), "Reexamining Dr. Johnson", in Wilson, Edmund (ed.), Classics and Commercials, New York: Farrar, Straus & Giroux, OCLC 185571431
- Wiltshire, John (1991), Samuel Johnson in the Medical World, Cambridge: Cambridge University Press, ISBN 978-0-521-38326-4
- Winchester, Simon (2003), The Meaning of Everything, Oxford: Oxford University Press, ISBN 978-0-19-517500-4
- Winters, Yvor (1943), The Anatomy of Nonsense, Norfolk, Conn.: New Directions, OCLC 191540
- Yung, Kai Kin (1984), Samuel Johnson, 1709–84, London: Herbert Press, ISBN 978-0-906969-45-8
