= Walter Jackson Bate =

American literary critic and biographer (1918–1999)

- Born: May 23, 1918; Mankato, Minnesota, U.S.
- Died: July 26, 1999 (aged 81); Boston, Massachusetts, U.S.
- Education: Harvard University (AB, AM, PhD in English)
- Occupation: Professor
- Writing career
- Genres: Literary criticism, biography
- Notable awards: Pulitzer Prize; National Book Award

Walter Jackson Bate (May 23, 1918 – July 26, 1999) was an American literary critic and biographer. He is known for Pulitzer Prize for Biography or Autobiography-winning biographies of Samuel Johnson (1978) and John Keats (1964). Samuel Johnson also won the 1978 U.S. National Book Award in Biography.

== Biography ==
Bate was born in Mankato, Minnesota. He studied under Douglas Bush and later taught English at Harvard University.

His critical work, especially The Burden of the Past and the English Poet, responds to and anticipates some aspects of the work of Harold Bloom. His biographies of Keats and Johnson have enjoyed extraordinary reputations both as scholarly resources and as works of literature in their own right.

He was elected a Fellow of the American Academy of Arts and Sciences in 1957 and a member of the American Philosophical Society in 1966. Bate retired from teaching at Harvard in 1986, and died on July 26, 1999, at Beth Israel Deaconess Medical Center in Boston, aged 81. A brief memoir of Bate by Robert D. Richardson appeared in 2013.

== Major works ==
- Negative Capability: The Intuitive Approach in Keats (1939; reprinted 1976, 2012).
- From Classic to Romantic: Premises of Taste in Eighteenth-Century England (1946; reprinted in 1961).
- Criticism: The Major Texts edited by (1952).
- The Achievement of Samuel Johnson (1955).
- The Stylistic Development of Keats (1958).
- Prefaces to Criticism (1959).
- John Keats (1963).
- Keats: A Collection of Critical Essays (1964).
- Coleridge (1968).
- The Burden of the Past and the English Poet (1970).
- Samuel Johnson (1977).
