= Temple (name) =

People and fictional characters with the name Temple include:

== Surname ==
- Bill Temple (footballer) (1914–2006), English footballer
- Derek Temple (born 1938), English footballer
- Diana Temple (1925–2006), Australian pharmacologist
- Floyd Temple (1926–2012), American baseball player and coach
- Francisco P. Temple (1822–1880), Californian statesman and merchant
- Frédéric Jacques Temple (1921–2020), French poet and writer
- Frederick Temple (1821–1902), Archbishop of Canterbury, grandson of William Johnson Temple
- George Frederick James Temple (1901–1992), English mathematician
- Henry John Temple, 3rd Viscount Palmerston (1784–1865), British prime minister
- Henry Wilson Temple (1864–1955), American politician
- Herbert R. Temple Jr. (1928–2024), American military officer
- James Temple (1606–1680), English Civil War soldier and regicide
- Julien Temple (born 1953), English film director
- Juno Temple (born 1989), English actress, daughter of Julien
- Lew Temple (born 1967), American film actor
- Luke Temple, American singer-songwriter
- Nancy Temple, former in-house attorney at Arthur Andersen LLP involved in the Enron scandal
- Nina Temple (born 1956), British communist politician
- Octavius Temple (1784–1834), British colonial official, son of William Johnson Temple
- Owen Temple (born 1976), American musician
- Peter Temple (1946–2018), Australian crime fiction writer
- Peter Temple (regicide) (1599–1663), English Member of Parliament
- Sir Peter Temple, 2nd Baronet (1592–1653), English Member of Parliament
- Philip Temple (born 1939), New Zealand fiction and non-fiction writer
- Richard Carnac Temple (1850–1931), British Chief Commissioner of the Andaman and Nicobar Islands and anthropological writer
- Robert K. G. Temple (born 1945), American author
- Shirley Temple (1928–2014), American child actress, singer, dancer and ambassador
- Simon Temple, the Elder (1780–1805) and Simon Temple, the Younger (1759–1815), English ship builders at Temple shipbuilders
- Tony Temple (born 1985), American football player
- Tracey Temple, former secretary to and lover of British Deputy Prime Minister John Prescott
- William Temple (governor) (1814–1863), Governor of Delaware
- William Temple (bishop) (1881–1944), Archbishop of Canterbury, son of Frederick, great-grandson of William Johnson Temple
- William Johnson Temple (1739–1796), English clergiman known for life-long correspondence with James Boswell

== Given name ==
- Temple Grandin (born 1947), American professor, slaughterhouse designer and autism activist
- Temple Hardy (1765–1814), British Royal Navy officer; grandson of Temple Stanyan
- Temple Hauptfleisch (born 1945), South African academic and playwright
- Temple Lea Houston (1860-1905), youngest son of Sam Houston
- Temple F. Smith (born 1939), American professor of biomedical engineering
- Temple Stanyan (1675–1752), English politician and historian of ancient Greece
- Temple Tucker, American basketball player

== Fictional characters ==
- the title character of Charlotte Temple, a 1791 novel by Susanna Rowson
- Claire Temple, a Marvel Comics character
  - Claire Temple (Marvel Cinematic Universe), the 21st-century film version of said character
- the title character of Lucy Temple, Charlotte Temple's daughter in an 1828 novel by Rowson
- Paul Temple, an amateur private detective created by Francis Durbridge
- Temple Drake, a William Faulkner character
