= Mary Moberly =

British headteacher in Newcastle

- Born: 23 March 1852; Rugby, Warwickshire
- Died: 4 August 1940 (aged 88); Jesmond, Newcastle
- Education: Newnham College, Cambridge
- Occupation: Head teacher
- Employer: Girls' Public Day School Trust
- Relatives: William Moberly (brother); Octavius Temple (grandfather)

Mary Moberly (23 March 1852 – 4 August 1940) was a British educator. She became the headteacher at what is now Newcastle High School for Girls which was founded by the Girls' Public Day School Trust (GDST). She joined the company in 1883 and retired in 1911.

== Early life and family ==
Moberly was born on 23 March 1852 in Rugby, Warwickshire. Her father, Revd Charles Edward Moberly, taught at Rugby School as an assistant master and sometime composer. Her older brother is the cricketer and rugby player William Moberly. Her mother was Catherine (née Temple) and Moberly's uncle was Frederick Temple, who was the head of Rugby School between 1858 and 1869. Her grandfather, Octavius Temple, was the Lieutenant Governor of Sierra Leone. She was a great-granddaughter of the cleric and essayist William Johnson Temple. Her cousin, William Temple, was the Archbishop of Canterbury.

Moberly is thought to have been home educated, but this gave her sufficient grounding to be accepted at Newnham College in Cambridge in 1878 with her five higher exam passes. She was a leading scholar and under Henry Sidgwick's guidance she was given distinctions in two subjects and she was awarded a first class pass (no degrees for women) in the Moral Science Tripos.

== Career ==
Upon finishing university, Moberly decided to teach. She spent a year in Notting Hill teaching before she was employed by the Girls' Public Day School Trust (GDST) and sent to Tunbridge Wells to be the head of their new girls' school in the town in 1883. She was not noted during her career for her public role but here she took a stand for women's suffrage. She was annoyed to find that her neighbours were allowed to vote, but despite her position and Cambridge education she was disqualified because of her gender. In 1889 she and two fellow teachers from her school were among the 2,000 signatures on a petition to parliament.

Moberly became the head teacher in 1891 of the GDST's Gateshead High School which was not thriving. She moved to the trust's school in Newcastle in 1895. There had previously been a GDST preparatory school in Newcastle but this was expanded and it was renamed to be the Central Newcastle High School. The GDST school in Gateshead continued until it was smoothly merged under her leadership into the Newcastle school in 1907. She employed several teachers from Gateshead and established a core of good teachers even though the school was not well equipped.

Moberly retired in 1911.

== Death ==
Moberly died at her home in Jesmond, Newcastle on 4 August 1940.
