= William Moberly =

England international rugby union player & sportsman

- Born: William Octavius Moberly; 14 November 1850; Shoreham-by-Sea, Sussex
- Died: 2 February 1914 (aged 63); Mullion, Cornwall
- Education: Rugby School
- Alma mater: Balliol College, Oxford
- Occupations: Cricketer; rugby player; teacher
- Employer: Clifton College
- Spouse: Emma Florence Taylor (m. 1884)
- Relatives: Mary Moberly (sister); Octavius Temple (grandfather)
- Cricket career

Cricket information
- Batting: Right-handed
- Role: Batsman, Wicket-keeper

Domestic team information
- Years: Team
- 1876–1887: Gloucestershire

Career statistics
Competition	First-class
Matches	66
Runs scored	2104
Batting average	21.46
100s/50s	3/9
Top score	121
Catches/stumpings	48/16
- Source: CricketArchive, 22 April 2023

Rugby union career
- Position: Three-quarter
Amateur team(s)
Years	Team	Apps	(Points)
- Ravenscourt Park Football Club
1876-?	Clifton Rugby Football Club		
–	Gloucestershire		
International career
Years	Team	Apps	(Points)
1872	England		

William Octavius Moberly (14 November 1850 – 2 February 1914) was an English sportsman who played first-class cricket for Gloucestershire and represented the England national rugby union team.

== Early life and education ==
Moberly was born on 14 November 1850 to Rev. Charles Edward Moberly and his wife, and Catherine (née Temple). His father was an assistant master at Rugby School and composer of the school's anthem. His mother was a daughter of Octavius Temple, the Lieutenant Governor of Sierra Leone, and granddaughter of the cleric and essayist William Johnson Temple.

Moberly had two younger sisters: Mary, 2 years his junior, who went on to become a headmistress of girls' schools in Gateshead and Newcastle, and the youngest, Frances, 4 years his junior.

Moberly was educated at Rugby School between 1862 and 1869. He matriculated at Balliol College, Oxford in 1969 as an Exhibitioner. He won a blue for rugby in 1872 and until 1874 played for the university. This included the first ever Varsity Match against Cambridge in 1872, with Moberly captaining Oxford to victory. He also played two first-class cricket matches for Oxford, against the Gentlemen of England in 1870 and 1872. He was captain of Oxford University Rugby Football Club from 1870 to 1872.

Having achieved Second Class in Classical Moderations and Literae humaniores, Moberly graduated from Oxford with a BA in 1873 and received his MA Oxon in 1877.

== Rugby career ==
As a wing-three-quarter, Moberly took part in the second ever rugby international between England and Scotland, in 1872. The match, which took place at The Oval, was won by England. Although at club level he always played three-quarter, he was picked as a fullback for England. He was described by Frank Marshall as a clever runner, who could "drop with either foot, and was a good shot at goal." At club level, Moberly turned out for the Ravenscourt Park Football Club.

He was appointed as an assistant master at Clifton College in 1874 and began playing for the Clifton Rugby Football Club two years later.

== Cricket career ==
Although his duties at Clifton restricted his appearances in first-class cricket, Moberly began playing with Gloucestershire in 1876 was a member of the teams which were the Champion County that year as well as the next. He was used as a top order batsman but would also fill in as wicket-keeper whenever fellow rugby union international and Clifton teammate James Bush was injured or unavailable.

In a match against Yorkshire in Cheltenham 1876, Moberly scored 103 and his captain W. G. Grace an unbeaten 318 when they put on 261 runs for the fifth wicket. It remained a Gloucestershire fifth-wicket partnership record, the longest surviving English county record, until May 2024 when a stand of 277 by James Bracey and Graeme van Buuren against Derbyshire beat it. Moberly finished the 1876 season with 245 runs at 40.83, his best year in terms of average but he had his most prolific summer in 1883 when he amassed 351 runs at 29.25. The latter tally included his highest first-class score of 121, which he scored in a win over Somerset at Taunton.

== Life off the pitch ==
Moberly was an assistant master at Clifton College from 1874 to 1913. He married his wife Emma Florence Taylor in 1884; she was a sister of his Clifton Rugby and Gloucestershire Cricket teammate Edmund Junkin Taylor. The Moberlys had no children.

He died suddenly in Mullion, Cornwall in February 1914; his obituary appeared in The Times. In 1993, a new boarding house at Clifton College was named after him.
