= St John the Baptist's Church, Sutterby =

Coordinates: 53.2306°N 0.0746°E

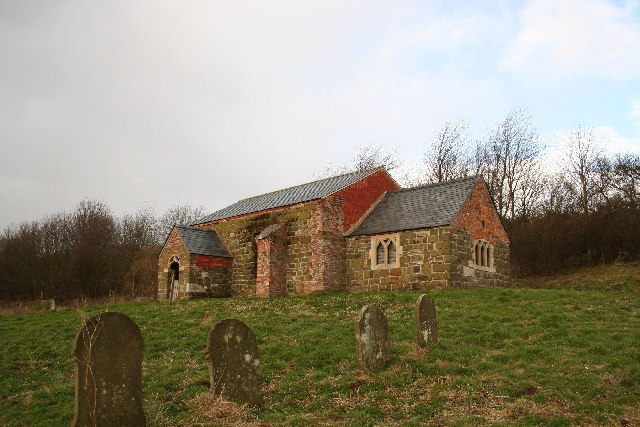
- St John the Baptist's Church, Sutterby, from the southeast

- Location in Lincolnshire
- OS grid reference: TF 386 724
- Location: Sutterby, Lincolnshire
- Country: England
- Denomination: Anglican
- Website: friendsoffriendlesschurches.org.uk/church/st-john-the-baptists-sutterby-lincolnshire/

History
- Dedication: John the Baptist

Architecture
- Functional status: Redundant
- Heritage designation: Grade II
- Designated: 3 February 1967
- Architectural type: Church
- Groundbreaking: 12th century
- Completed: 14th century

Specifications
- Materials: Greenstone with brick, slate roofs

St John the Baptist's Church is a redundant Anglican church in the village of Sutterby, Lincolnshire, England. It is recorded in the National Heritage List for England as a designated Grade II listed building, and is under the care of the Friends of Friendless Churches.

== History ==
The church dates from the 12th century with additions in the 14th century. A south porch was added in 1743. It was declared redundant by the Diocese of Lincoln in August 1972, and gifted as a monument in March 1981. It was taken into the care of the charity, the Friends of Friendless Churches, who has held the freehold from 3 July 1981. Major repairs were carried out in 2002, and more repairs have been undertaken since 2010.

== Architecture ==
St John's is a simple building in one storey. It is constructed in greenstone with some brick patching, and has slate roofs. Its plan consists of a nave with a south porch, and a narrower chancel. In the west wall is a blocked window. The north wall contains a blocked 12th-century round-arched doorway and a blocked rectangular window. In the east wall is a four-light window with trefoil heads, and there is a similar two-light window in the south wall of the chancel. The south wall of the nave is supported by a brick buttress, to the left of which is a two-light window dating from the 14th century. The porch is gabled and has a 14th-century ogee-arched doorway. Internally, the furniture includes a 14th-century font in Decorated style with carved tracery on its sides, an 18th-century pulpit which is in a collapsed condition, and what remains of a 19th-century screen.
