= The Idler (1758–1760) =

Series of essays by Samuel Johnson

The Idler was a series of 103 essays, all but twelve of them by Samuel Johnson, published in the London weekly the Universal Chronicle between 1758 and 1760. It is likely that the Chronicle was published for the sole purpose of including The Idler, since it had produced only one issue before the series began, and ceased publication when it finished. The authors besides Johnson were Thomas Warton, Bennet Langton, and Joshua Reynolds.

Johnson's biographer, James Boswell, recalled that Johnson wrote some of the essays in The Idler "as hastily as an ordinary letter". He said that once while visiting Oxford, Johnson composed an essay due for publication the next day in the half-hour before the last post was collected.

The essays were so popular that other publications began reprinting them without permission, prompting Johnson to insert a notice in the Chronicle threatening to do the same to his competitors' material and give the profits to London's prostitutes.

When The Idler appeared in book form, one of Johnson's essays, The Vulture, was omitted, apparently because its anti-war satire was felt to be seditious. Johnson replaced it with an essay on the imprisonment of debtors.

== The essays ==
All the essays were published under the byline "Idler". They were not given titles until they were published in book form. In the book's introduction, Johnson specified that twelve of the essays were not his. The authors of seven of the essays were named in Boswell's biography; the authorship of the other five remains unclear.

=== No 1. The Idler's character (Johnson) ===
Published: Saturday, 15 April 1758

Johnson explains how he chose his pen name. "Every man is", he says, "or hopes to be, an Idler." He promises his readers "obloquy and satire": "The Idler is naturally censorious; those who attempt nothing themselves, think every thing easily performed, and consider the unsuccessful always as criminal." However, he says that this incurs no obligation and that disappointed readers will have only themselves to blame.

"Every mode of life has its conveniencies. The Idler, who habituates himself to be satisfied with what he can most easily obtain, not only escapes labours which are often fruitless, but sometimes succeeds better than those who despise all that is within their reach, and think every thing more valuable as it is harder to be acquired."

=== No 2. Invitation to correspondents (Johnson) ===
Published: Saturday, 22 April 1758

Johnson complains that, although he has "now been a writer almost a week", he has not received a single letter of praise, nor has he had any contributions to the series. He asks for "those who have already devoted themselves to literature, or, without any determinate intention, wander at large through the expanse of life" to submit essays for publication under the Idler byline.

"He that is known to contribute to a periodical work, needs no other caution than not to tell what particular pieces are his own; such secrecy is indeed very difficult; but if it can be maintained, it is scarcely to be imagined at how small an expense he may grow considerable."

=== No 3. Idler's reason for writing (Johnson) ===
Published: Saturday, 29 April 1758

Johnson considers the possibility that essayists may someday run out of amusing topics. He explains that he writes to bring relief to his fellow idlers and others "who awake in the morning, vacant of thought, with minds gaping for the intellectual food, which some kind essayist has been accustomed to supply."

"Much mischief is done in the world with very little interest or design. He that assumes the character of a critick, and justifies his claim by perpetual censure, imagines that he is hurting none but the author, and him he considers as a pestilent animal, whom every other being has a right to persecute; little does he think how many harmless men he involves in his own guilt, by teaching them to be noxious without malignity, and to repeat objections which they do not understand; or how many honest minds he debars from pleasure, by exciting an artificial fastidiousness, and making them too wise to concur with their own sensations. He who is taught by a critick to dislike that which pleased him in his natural state, has the same reason to complain of his instructor, as the madman to rail at his doctor, who, when he thought himself master of Peru, physicked him to poverty."

=== No 4. Charities and hospitals (Johnson) ===
Published: Saturday, 6 May 1758

Johnson says that charity is "known only to those who enjoy, either immediately or by transmission, the light of revelation." He claims that it was unheard of in ancient Rome, and that Islam and Zoroastrianism imported the idea from Judaism or Christianity. He notes that hospitals in Britain are sustained solely by charitable donations, and calls upon them to stop feuding with one another lest such donations be discouraged.

"Compassion is by some reasoners, on whom the name of philosophers has been too easily conferred, resolved into an affection merely selfish, an involuntary perception of pain at the involuntary sight of a being like ourselves languishing in misery. But this sensation, if ever it be felt at all from the brute instinct of uninstructed nature, will only produce effects desultory and transient; it will never settle into a principle of action, or extend relief to calamities unseen, in generations not yet in being."

=== No 5. Proposal for a female army (Johnson) ===
Published: Saturday, 13 May 1758

As more soldiers are deployed in the Seven Years' War, Johnson affects pity for the wives and sweethearts left behind in England, and suggests that an army of women be formed so they can follow their loved ones. He says that since the invention of modern weapons, he "cannot find that a modern soldier has any duties, except that of obedience, which a lady cannot perform. If the hair has lost its powder, a lady has a puff; if a coat be spotted, a lady has a brush."

"Of these ladies, some, I hope, have lap-dogs, and some monkeys; but they are unsatisfactory companions. Many useful offices are performed by men of scarlet, to which neither dog nor monkey has adequate abilities. A parrot, indeed, is as fine as a colonel, and, if he has been much used to good company, is not wholly without conversation; but a parrot, after all, is a poor little creature, and has neither sword nor shoulder-knot, can neither dance nor play at cards."

=== No 6. Lady's performance on horseback (Johnson) ===
Published: Saturday, 20 May 1758

Johnson comments on the public adulation given a woman who rode a horse a thousand miles in less than a thousand hours. With tongue in cheek, he suggests that a statue be erected to her for posterity, and speculates on the wording of the inscription.

"Let it therefore be carefully mentioned, that by this performance she won her wager; and, lest this should, by any change of manners, seem an inadequate or incredible incitement, let it be added, that at this time the original motives of human actions had lost their influence; that the love of praise was extinct; the fear of infamy was become ridiculous; and the only wish of an Englishman was" to win his wager.

=== No 7. Scheme for news-writers (Johnson) ===
Published: Saturday, 27 May 1758

Johnson bemoans the repetitiveness of news coverage. He suggests that, instead of announcing an event all at once and then rehashing it endlessly, newspaper writers should reveal the story gradually to keep readers entertained.

"Thus journals are daily multiplied without increase of knowledge. The tale of the morning paper is told again in the evening, and the narratives of the evening are bought again in the morning. These repetitions, indeed, waste time, but they do not shorten it. The most eager peruser of news is tired before he has completed his labour; and many a man, who enters the coffee-house in his nightgown and slippers, is called away to his shop, or his dinner, before he has well considered the state of Europe."

=== No 8. Plan of military discipline (Johnson) ===
Published: Saturday, 3 June 1758

This instalment takes the form of a letter to the Idler, but it is not among the essays that Johnson attributed to others.

The writer proposes a method of developing courage in British soldiers. He suggests that they be lured to a mock fortress with roast beef and ale and made to march upon it before they can eat. This should be done day after day, with a few more frightening sights and sounds being added to the scene each time. The soldiers will eventually be accustomed enough to violence to brave enemy fire.

"I cannot pretend to inform our generals through what gradations of danger they should train their men to fortitude. They best know what the soldiers and what themselves can bear. It will be proper that the war should every day vary its appearance. Sometimes, as they mount the rampart, a cook may throw fat upon the fire, to accustom them to a sudden blaze; and sometimes, by the clatter of empty pots, they may be inured to formidable noises. But let it never be forgotten, that victory must repose with a full belly."

=== No 9. Progress of idleness (authorship uncertain) ===
Published: Saturday, 10 June 1758

A correspondent complains that the Idler does not give tips on how to be idle. The Idler says this request shows that the writer "is yet but in the rudiments of idleness, and has attained neither the practice nor theory of wasting life." True idleness comes only with practice.

"So wide is the region of Idleness, and so powerful her influence. But she does not immediately confer all her gifts. My correspondent, who seems, with all his errours, worthy of advice, must be told, that he is calling too hastily for the last effusion of total insensibility. Whatever he may have been taught by unskilful Idlers to believe, labour is necessary in his initiation to idleness. He that never labours may know the pains of idleness, but not the pleasure. The comfort is, that if he devotes himself to insensibility, he will daily lengthen the intervals of idleness, and shorten those of labour, till at last he will lie down to rest, and no longer disturb the world or himself by bustle or competition."

=== No 10. Political credulity (Johnson) ===
Published: Saturday, 17 June 1758

Johnson discusses political zealots, who "resign the use of their own eyes and ears, and resolve to believe nothing that does not favour those whom they profess to follow." He describes the two basic types of his time, personified as Tom Tempest (a supporter of the House of Stuart) and Jack Sneaker (a supporter of the House of Hanover).

"The bigot of philosophy is seduced by authorities which he has not always opportunities to examine, is entangled in systems by which truth and falsehood are inextricably complicated, or undertakes to talk on subjects which nature did not form him able to comprehend."

=== No 11. Discourses on the weather (Johnson) ===
Published: Saturday, 24 June 1758

Johnson says the English are obsessed with their weather because it is so changeable. He lampoons the fashionable theory that a country's political climate is determined by its weather, and criticises those who let the weather affect their mood.

"Such is the reason of our practice; and who shall treat it with contempt? Surely not the attendant on a court, whose business is to watch the looks of a being weak and foolish as himself, and whose vanity is to recount the names of men, who might drop into nothing, and leave no vacuity; nor the proprietor of funds, who stops his acquaintance in the street to tell him of the loss of half-a-crown; nor the inquirer after news, who fills his head with foreign events, and talks of skirmishes and sieges, of which no consequence will ever reach his hearers or himself. The weather is a nobler and more interesting subject; it is the present state of the skies, and of the earth, on which plenty and famine are suspended, on which millions depend for the necessaries of life."

=== No 12. Marriages, why advertised (Johnson) ===
Published: Saturday, 1 July 1758

Johnson mocks marriage announcements in newspapers, which he says are published out of the couples' desire for fame. He tells of a friend's plan to set up a business selling "matrimonial panegyricks".

"To get a name, can happen but to few. A name, even in the most commercial nation, is one of the few things which cannot be bought. It is the free gift of mankind, which must be deserved before it will be granted, and is at last unwillingly bestowed. But this unwillingness only increases desire in him who believes his merit sufficient to overcome it."

=== No 13. The imaginary housewife (Johnson) ===
Published: Saturday, 8 July 1758

A fictional correspondent complains that his wife, in her fear of idleness, makes their daughters work constantly at sewing. As a result, the house is filled with unneeded embroidery and the girls are ignorant of every other subject.

"Molly asked me the other day, whether Ireland was in France, and was ordered by her mother to mend her hem. Kitty knows not, at sixteen, the difference between a Protestant and a Papist, because she has been employed three years in filling the side of a closet with a hanging that is to represent Cranmer in the flames. And Dolly, my eldest girl, is now unable to read a chapter in the Bible, having spent all the time, which other children pass at school, in working the interview between Solomon and the queen of Sheba."

=== No 14. Robbery of time (Johnson) ===
Published: Saturday, 15 July 1758

Johnson discusses those who waste time by waiting upon great men. "The truth is", he comments, "that the inconveniencies of attendance are more lamented than felt." More troubling are everyday nuisances like chatterboxes and the habitually late.

"If we will have the kindness of others, we must endure their follies. He who cannot persuade himself to withdraw from society, must be content to pay a tribute of his time to a multitude of tyrants; to the loiterer, who makes appointments which he never keeps; to the consulter, who asks advice which he never takes; to the boaster, who blusters only to be praised; to the complainer, who whines only to be pitied; to the projector, whose happiness is to entertain his friends with expectations which all but himself know to be vain; to the economist, who tells of bargains and settlements; to the politician, who predicts the fate of battles and breach of alliances; to the usurer, who compares the different funds; and to the talker, who talks only because he loves to be talking."

=== No 15. Treacle's complaint of his wife (authorship uncertain) ===
Published: Saturday, 22 July 1758

A correspondent calling himself Zachary Treacle complains about his domestic life. His wife hangs around his grocery shop all day getting in the way, while his young son climbs on the shelves and knocks things over. Both force him to spend his Sundays in idleness, much to his annoyance.

"Thus, Sir, does she constantly drawl out her time, without either profit or satisfaction; and, while I see my neighbours' wives helping in the shop, and almost earning as much as their husbands, I have the mortification to find that mine is nothing but a dead weight upon me. In short, I do not know any greater misfortune can happen to a plain hard-working tradesman, as I am, than to be joined to such a woman, who is rather a clog than a helpmate to him."

=== No 16. Drugget's retirement (Johnson) ===
Published: Saturday, 29 July 1758

Johnson describes a visit to his friend Ned Drugget, a dealer in cloth remnants. Although Drugget has become rich through hard work, he longed for fresh air and relaxation, and has therefore rented a 'country lodging'—a room in Islington. He spends his days counting passing carriages through the window, which he cannot open because of the dust.

"Every maid, whose misfortune it was to be taller than her lady, matched her gown at Mr. Drugget's; and many a maiden, who had passed a winter with her aunt in London, dazzled the rusticks, at her return, with cheap finery which Drugget had supplied. His shop was often visited in a morning by ladies who left their coaches in the next street, and crept through the alley in linen gowns. Drugget knows the rank of his customers by their bashfulness; and, when he finds them unwilling to be seen, invites them up stairs, or retires with them to the back window."

=== No 17. Expedients of idlers (Johnson) ===
Published: 5 August 1758

Recent weather forecasts for London have been wildly inaccurate. Johnson says this is but one example of the follies of speculating. He says scientists are really idlers who don't want to admit they are idlers. Those who "sport only with inanimate nature" are useless but innocent, but those who perform cruel experiments on animals are "a race of wretches". The rest of the essay is a fierce denunciation of vivisection.

"Among those whom I never could persuade to rank themselves with Idlers, and who speak with indignation of my morning sleeps and nocturnal rambles; one passes the day in catching spiders, that he may count their eyes with a microscope; another erects his head, and exhibits the dust of a marigold separated from the flower with a dexterity worthy of Leuwenhoeck himself. Some turn the wheel of electricity; some suspend rings to a load-stone, and find that what they did yesterday they can do again to-day. Some register the changes of the wind, and die fully convinced that the wind is changeable."

=== No 18. Drugget vindicated (Johnson) ===
Published: Saturday, 12 August 1758

A correspondent writes to defend Ned Drugget, whose "country home" was mocked in No 16. All pleasures and diversions are the result of self-deception.

"The theatre is not filled with those that know or regard the skill of the actor, nor the ball-room by those who dance, or attend to the dancers. To all places of general resort, where the standard of pleasure is erected, we run with equal eagerness, or appearance of eagerness, for very different reasons. One goes that he may say he has been there, another because he never misses. This man goes to try what he can find, and that to discover what others find. Whatever diversion is costly will be frequented by those who desire to be thought rich; and whatever has, by any accident, become fashionable, easily continues its reputation, because every one is ashamed of not partaking it."

=== No 19. Whirler's character (Johnson) ===
Published: Saturday, 19 August 1758

One school of philosophy states that happiness is to be found in complete relaxation, while another says it is irresponsible not to contribute to the work of humanity. Johnson introduces a great philosopher of the middle ground, Jack Whirler, "whose business keeps him in perpetual motion, and whose motion always eludes his business; who is always to do what he never does, who cannot stand still because he is wanted in another place, and who is wanted in many places because he stays in none."

"Thus Jack Whirler lives in perpetual fatigue without proportionate advantage, because he does not consider that no man can see all with his own eyes, or do all with his own hands; that whoever is engaged in multiplicity of business, must transact much by substitution, and leave something to hazard; and that he who attempts to do all, will waste his life in doing little."

=== No 20. Capture of Louisbourg (Johnson) ===
Published: Saturday, 29 August 1758

Following the British victory at Fort Louisbourg, Johnson imagines how both British and French historians will describe the event in a hundred years.

"For this reason every historian discovers his country; and it is impossible to read the different accounts of any great event, without a wish that truth had more power over partiality."

=== No 21. Linger's history of listlessness (Johnson) ===
Published: Saturday, 2 September 1758

A correspondent called Dick Linger describes his futile lifelong struggle against listlessness. He was in the army, but quit because of boredom; married, but found ennui soon set in; and now spends his days making a nuisance of himself at the houses of friends. He has a plan for a "complete amendment" of his life, but has been putting off implementing it for more than twenty years.

"I suppose every man is shocked when he hears how frequently soldiers are wishing for war. The wish is not always sincere; the greater part are content with sleep and lace, and counterfeit an ardour which they do not feel; but those who desire it most are neither prompted by malevolence nor patriotism; they neither pant for laurels, nor delight in blood; but long to be delivered from the tyranny of idleness, and restored to the dignity of active beings."

=== No 22. The vulture (Johnson) ===
(This essay was omitted when The Idler was published in book form. The essay that follows, 22a, took its place.)

Published: 16 September 1758

A mother vulture is instructing her children before they leave the nest. She tells them that of all the titbits of flesh she has brought them, the tastiest come from man. The children ask how she can kill a man, who is so much bigger than her. The mother says she doesn't have to: men regularly meet in fields where they kill one another in large numbers and leave the corpses as a feast for the vultures. The children are astonished that any animal would kill something it did not intend to eat. The mother repeats a theory that men are not animals at all, but "vegetables with a power of motion; and that as the boughs of an oak are dashed together by the storm, that swine may fatten upon the falling acorns, so men are, by some unaccountable power, driven one against another, till they lose their motion, that vultures may be fed."

"The old vultures will tell you when you are to watch his motions. When you see men in great numbers moving close together, like a flock of storks, you may conclude that they are hunting, and that you will soon revel in human blood."

==== No 22a. Imprisonment of debtors (Johnson) ====
(This essay was printed in place of The vulture when the series was collected in book form.)

A correspondent condemns the practice of sending debtors to prison, saying that many end up there because of jealousy and spite, rather than because they have done any real harm. Creditors should be given a fixed amount of time to prove that a debtor has hidden assets. If no proof can be found, the debtor should be released.

"Those who made the laws have apparently supposed, that every deficiency of payment is the crime of the debtor. But the truth is, that the creditor always shares the act, and often more than shares the guilt, of improper trust. It seldom happens that any man imprisons another but for debts which he suffered to be contracted in hope of advantage to himself, and for bargains in which he proportioned his profit to his own opinion of the hazard; and there is no reason why one should punish the other for a contract in which both concurred."

=== No 23. Uncertainty of friendship (Johnson) ===
Published: Saturday, 23 September 1758

Johnson considers the many ways in which a friendship can end, such as envy, suspicion, sudden disagreements or casual decay. Meeting an old friend after a long separation is usually disappointing: "no man considers how much alteration time has made in himself, and very few inquire what effect it has had upon others."

"Friendship is often destroyed by opposition of interest, not only by the ponderous and visible interest which the desire of wealth and greatness forms and maintains, but by a thousand secret and slight competitions, scarcely known to the mind upon which they operate. There is scarcely any man without some favourite trifle which he values above greater attainments, some desire of petty praise which he cannot patiently suffer to be frustrated. This minute ambition is sometimes crossed before it is known, and sometimes defeated by wanton petulance; but such attacks are seldom made without the loss of friendship; for whoever has once found the vulnerable part will always be feared, and the resentment will burn on in secret, of which shame hinders the discovery."

=== No 24. Man does not always think (Johnson) ===
Published: Saturday, 30 September 1758

Johnson is not very interested in whether animals think, because he is too busy wondering whether his fellow humans think. A great portion of humanity spend their lives in a state of "careless stupidity". Johnson concludes that a lack of thought comes from a lack of material to think about.

"It is reasonable to believe, that thought, like every thing else, has its causes and effects; that it must proceed from something known, done, or suffered; and must produce some action or event. Yet how great is the number of those in whose minds no source of thought has ever been opened, in whose life no consequence of thought is ever discovered; who have learned nothing upon which they can reflect; who have neither seen nor felt any thing which could leave its traces on the memory; who neither foresee nor desire any change in their condition, and have therefore neither fear, hope, nor design, and yet are supposed to be thinking beings."

=== No 25. New actors on the stage (Johnson) ===
Published: Saturday, 7 October 1758

A correspondent pleads on behalf of young actors, suggesting urging theatre critics to make allowances for nervousness and inexperience. Johnson extends the appeal to young poets, then to young people in general.

"There is nothing for which such numbers think themselves qualified as for theatrical exhibition. Every human being has an action graceful to his own eye, a voice musical to his own ear, and a sensibility which nature forbids him to know that any other bosom can excel. An art in which such numbers fancy themselves excellent, and which the publick liberally rewards, will excite many competitors, and in many attempts there must be many miscarriages."

=== No 26. Betty Broom's history (Johnson) ===
Published: Saturday, 14 October 1758

Betty Broom, a kitchen maid, tells her sad history. She was educated for a few years at a charity school, where she excelled. However, the school's chief donor stopped giving money, saying the poor were becoming so well educated that it was difficult for the rich to find servants. The school closed down, and Betty was sent to find a position. She originally worked for the family of a rich watchmaker, but they squandered their money on entertainment and could not pay the servants. She was then hired to wait on a hatter and his wife, who kept such different hours that she had no chance to sleep. Her next employers had six children and ordered her to indulge them in everything, but since she couldn't keep all the children happy at once, she was dismissed. Finally she worked in a linen shop. The owner's wife stole money and blamed her when the loss was discovered. Betty promises to complete her story another time, and asks the Idler to tell her "for which of my places, except perhaps the last, I was disqualified by my skill in reading and writing."

"At last the chief of our subscribers, having passed a winter in London, came down full of an opinion new and strange to the whole country. She held it little less than criminal to teach poor girls to read and write. They who are born to poverty, she said, are born to ignorance, and will work the harder the less they know. She told her friends, that London was in confusion by the insolence of servants; that scarcely a wench was to be got for all work, since education had made such numbers of fine ladies; that nobody would now accept a lower title than that of a waiting-maid, or something that might qualify her to wear laced shoes and long ruffles, and to sit at work in the parlour window. But she was resolved, for her part, to spoil no more girls; those, who were to live by their hands, should neither read nor write out of her pocket; the world was bad enough already, and she would have no part in making it worse."

=== No 27. Power of habits (Johnson) ===
Published: Saturday, 21 October 1758

Most people who resolve to change their habits fail, although that does not dissuade them from trying again and again. When someone does manage to change, the change has usually been forced upon them. Johnson counsels his readers to avoid taking up bad habits in the first place, since this is far easier than getting rid of them later.

"This counsel has been often given with serious dignity, and often received with appearance of conviction; but, as very few can search deep into their own minds without meeting what they wish to hide from themselves, scarcely any man persists in cultivating such disagreeable acquaintance, but draws the veil again between his eyes and his heart, leaves his passions and appetites as he found them, and advises others to look into themselves."

=== No 28. Wedding-day. Grocer's wife. Chairman (Johnson) ===
Published: Saturday, 28 October 1758

This entry begins with responses to two earlier instalments. Timothy Mushroom tells how he was determined to avoid announcing his marriage in the papers (see No 12), but was pressured into it by his bride's family. Next, Mrs Treacle, the wife of the shopkeeper in No 14, writes to tell her side of the story. Her husband bought his shop with her dowry, goes to the alehouse at every opportunity and squanders his money playing ninepins. She has to hang around the shop to make sure he works, and she takes him out on Sundays so that he will not spend the day in dissipation. Finally, a chairman (that is, one who carries passengers on a chair) complains that he should be paid according to the weight of his passengers.

"It is very easy for a man who sits idle at home, and has nobody to please but himself, to ridicule or to censure the common practices of mankind; and those who have no present temptation to break the rules of propriety, may applaud his judgment, and join in his merriment; but let the author or his readers mingle with common life, they will find themselves irresistibly borne away by the stream of custom, and must submit, after they have laughed at others, to give others the same opportunity of laughing at them."

=== No 29. Betty Broom's history continued (Johnson) ===
Published: Saturday, 4 November 1758

Betty Broom, whom we first met in No 26, continues her story. After leaving the linen shop, she took lodging in a garret, where a neighbour stole many of her clothes. She eventually found work as an under-maid in a mercer's household. The mercer's son stayed out drinking till late at night, and Betty was told to wait up for him and see he got to bed safely. She passed the time by reading books from her master's library. When the mercer's wife found out about this, she sacked Betty, declaring that "she never knew any of the readers that had good designs in their heads." Betty then worked for a gentlewoman who loved books and was pleased to have a maid who loved them too. However, this happiness lasted for just fifteen months before the gentlewoman suddenly died. At her next position, Betty was fired after just three weeks because the family thought her manners were too refined for a servant, and concluded she must be a gentlewoman in disguise. At the next, she is sacked when the mistress discovers she can write; at the next, she is at first encouraged by the housekeeper and steward, but then forced out when the housekeeper becomes jealous. Her final situation was with a consumptive woman, who had a foul temper but left Betty five hundred pounds in her will. Betty decides to retire on this fortune to her native parish, and to spend her time teaching poor girls to read and write.

"At last, the upper-maid found my book, and showed it to my mistress, who told me, that wenches like me might spend their time better; that she never knew any of the readers that had good designs in their heads; that she could always find something else to do with her time, than to puzzle over books; and did not like that such a fine lady should sit up for her young master."

=== No 30. Corruption of news-writers (Johnson) ===
Published: Saturday, 11 November 1758

Stating that "money and time are the heaviest burdens of life, and that the unhappiest of all mortals are those who have more of either than they know how to use", Johnson praises those who spend their lives inventing new amusement for the rich and idle. Chief among these are the newswriters, who have multiplied greatly in recent years. Johnson identifies the necessary qualities of a journalist as "contempt of shame and indifference to truth", and says that wartime offers the perfect opportunity to exercise these.

"Among the calamities of war may be justly numbered the diminution of the love of truth, by the falsehoods which interest dictates, and credulity encourages. A peace will equally leave the warriour and relater of wars destitute of employment; and I know not whether more is to be dreaded from streets filled with soldiers accustomed to plunder, or from garrets filled with scribblers accustomed to lie."

=== No 31. Disguises of idleness. Sober's character (Johnson) ===
Published: Saturday, 18 November 1758

Johnson talks about the many forms idleness can take. There are idlers who are proud to call themselves idle, and there are idlers who disguise their idleness with pointless bustling. There are those who occupy themselves by making plans that will never come about. Then there are those who prefer "to fill the day with petty business, to have always something in hand which may raise curiosity, but not solicitude, and keep the mind in a state of action, but not of labour." The exemplar of this type is Mr Sober. Full of ideas but too lazy to carry them out, he distracts himself with conversation and hobbies.

Hester Thrale wrote in her Miscellanies that this essay was "intended as his own portrait".

"Sober is a man of strong desires and quick imagination, so exactly balanced by the love of ease, that they can seldom stimulate him to any difficult undertaking; they have, however, so much power, that they will not suffer him to lie quite at rest; and though they do not make him sufficiently useful to others, they make him at least weary of himself."

=== No 32. On Sleep (Johnson) ===
Published: Saturday, 25 November 1758

Johnson contemplates the power of sleep, which comes from an unknown source, overpowers all people equally, and provides an escape from the struggles of life. Many people, not content with the forgetfulness provided by sleep, supplement it with "semi-slumbers" like drunkenness, daydreaming and company.

"All envy would be extinguished, if it were universally known that there are none to be envied, and surely none can be much envied who are not pleased with themselves. There is reason to suspect, that the distinctions of mankind have more show than value, when it is found that all agree to be weary alike of pleasures and of cares; that the powerful and the weak, the celebrated and obscure, join in one common wish, and implore from nature's hand the nectar of oblivion."

=== No 33. Journal of a fellow of a college (Warton) ===
Published: Saturday, 2 December 1758

A correspondent submits the diary of a senior fellow at Cambridge University, a chronicle of idleness, gluttony and petty complaints. Walton follows this with a defence of Oxford and Cambridge. The "genius of the place" inspires students to high achievement, and the universities keep students virtuous by "excluding all opportunities of vice".

"Twelve. Drest. Sauntered up to the Fish-monger's hill. Met Mr. H. and went with him to Peterhouse. Cook made us wait thirty-six minutes beyond the time. The company, some of my Emmanuel friends. For dinner, a pair of soles, a leg of pork and pease, among other things. Mem. Pease-pudding not boiled enough. Cook reprimanded and sconced in my presence."

=== No 34. Punch and conversation compared (Johnson) ===
Published: Saturday, 9 December 1758

After a discussion of analogies and metaphors, Johnson compares the components of good punch to those of good conversation. He equates spirits with wit, lemon juice with raillery, sugar with adulation and water with "easy prattle". The ingredients must be blended in the right proportions to create a pleasing final product.

"He only will please long, who, by tempering the acidity of satire with the sugar of civility, and allaying the heat of wit with the frigidity of humble chat, can make the true punch of conversation; and, as that punch can be drunk in the greatest quantity which has the largest proportion of water, so that companion will be oftenest welcome, whose talk flows out with inoffensive copiousness, and unenvied insipidity."

=== No 35. Auction-hunter described and ridiculed (Johnson) ===
Published: Saturday, 16 December 1758

A husband complains that his wife is always hunting for bargains at auctions, even though the house is crammed with her purchases. She also buys meat in bulk and preserves it in salt, rather than pay a higher price for fresh meat. At his wits' end, he resolves to hold his own auction and clear out his house.

"I am the unfortunate husband of a buyer of bargains. My wife has somewhere heard, that a good housewife never has any thing to purchase when it is wanted. This maxim is often in her mouth, and always in her head. She is not one of those philosophical talkers that speculate without practice; and learn sentences of wisdom only to repeat them: she is always making additions to her stores; she never looks into a broker's shop, but she spies something that may be wanted some time; and it is impossible to make her pass the door of a house where she hears goods selling by auction."

=== No 36. The terrific diction ridiculed (Johnson) ===
Published: 23 December 1758

Johnson identifies a new kind of pompous language: the "terrific" style, also known as "repulsive" or "bugbear": "by which the most evident truths are so obscured that they can no longer be perceived, and the most familiar propositions so disguised that they cannot be known." He says that an "illustrious example" of this style can be found in the popular philosophical work Letters Concerning Mind.

"A mother tells her infant, that 'two and two make four'; the child remembers the proposition, and is able to count four to all the purposes of life, till the course of his education brings him among philosophers, who fright him from his former knowledge, by telling him, that four is a certain aggregate of units; that all numbers being only the repetition of a unit, which, though not a number itself, is the parent, root, or original of all number, 'four' is the denomination assigned to a certain number of such repetitions. The only danger is, lest, when he first hears these dreadful sounds, the pupil should run away; if he has but the courage to stay till the conclusion, he will find that, when speculation has done its worst, two and two still make four."

=== No 37. Useful things easy of attainment (Johnson) ===
Published: Saturday, 30 December 1758

Johnson says that everything people really need is plentiful and easy to reach. It is only when people strive for things beyond their reach that they have difficulty.

"Thus plenty is the original cause of many of our needs; and even the poverty, which is so frequent and distressful in civilised nations, proceeds often from that change of manners which opulence has produced. Nature makes us poor only when we want necessaries; but custom gives the name of poverty to the want of superfluities."

=== No 38. Cruelty shown to debtors in prison (Johnson) ===
Published: Saturday, 6 January 1759

Johnson comments on a newspaper report that there are 20,000 debtors imprisoned in England – that is, one in every 300 inhabitants. He estimates that the economy loses £300,000 a year as a result, to say nothing of the misery inflicted on the prisoners' loved ones. He says conditions in prison are so bad that one in five prisoners dies there, and that prisons are breeding grounds for more crime.

In a note to the 1761 edition, Johnson wrote that the number of debtors given in the original essay "was at that time confidently published, but the authour has since found reason to question the calculation".

"The monastick institutions have been often blamed, as tending to retard the increase of mankind. And, perhaps, retirement ought rarely to be permitted, except to those whose employment is consistent with abstraction, and who, though solitary, will not be idle; to those whom infirmity makes useless to the commonwealth, or to those who have paid their due proportion to society, and who, having lived for others, may be honourably dismissed to live for themselves. But whatever be the evil or the folly of these retreats, those have no right to censure them whose prisons contain greater numbers than the monasteries of other countries. It is, surely, less foolish and less criminal to permit inaction than compel it; to comply with doubtful opinions of happiness, than condemn to certain and apparent misery; to indulge the extravagancies of erroneous piety, than to multiply and enforce temptations to wickedness."

=== No 39. The various uses of the bracelet (Johnson) ===
Published: Saturday, 13 January 1759

Bracelets bearing pictures of the wearer's husband and children are in fashion with English women. A correspondent suggests some variations on the theme. Women could wear an emblem showing their profession, favourite pastime or station in life. Or they could wear a small mirror, which would be "a perpetual source of delight". Likewise, soldiers could wear trinkets that remind them of military defeats or ignominious victories.

"Yet I know not whether it is the interest of the husband to solicit very earnestly a place on the bracelet. If his image be not in the heart, it is of small avail to hang it on the hand. A husband encircled with diamonds and rubies may gain some esteem, but will never excite love. He that thinks himself most secure of his wife, should be fearful of persecuting her continually with his presence. The joy of life is variety; the tenderest love requires to be rekindled by intervals of absence; and Fidelity herself will be wearied with transferring her eye only from the same man to the same picture."

=== No 40. The art of advertising exemplified (Johnson) ===
Published: Saturday, 20 January 1759

The newspapers have become so crammed with adverts that advertisers must use more and more extravagant ploys to get noticed. Johnson quotes from several prime examples of the day. He dryly suggests that advertisers write with posterity in mind: "When these collections shall be read in another century, how will numberless contradictions be reconciled? and how shall fame be possibly distributed among the tailors and bodice-makers of the present age?"

"Promise, large promise, is the soul of an advertisement. I remember a 'wash-ball' that had a quality truly wonderful – it gave an 'exquisite edge to the razor'. And there are now to be sold, 'for ready money only', some 'duvets for bed-coverings, of down, beyond comparison superior to what is called otter-down', and indeed such, that its 'many excellencies cannot be here set forth'. With one excellence we are made acquainted – 'it is warmer than four or five blankets, and lighter than one'. There are some, however, that know the prejudice of mankind in favour of modest sincerity. The vender of the 'beautifying fluid' sells a lotion that repels pimples, washes away freckles, smooths the skin, and plumps the flesh; and yet, with a generous abhorrence of ostentation, confesses, that it will not 'restore the bloom of fifteen to a lady of fifty'."

=== No 41. Serious reflections on the death of a friend (Johnson) ===
Published: Saturday, 27 January 1759

Someone known to Johnson has died suddenly, leaving him filled with "emptiness and horrour". He reflects that the inevitable cost of life is to outlive people one loves, and hopes that "the union of souls" may continue after death. Finding no comfort in Epicurus or Zeno, he turns to the Gospels: "Philosophy may infuse stubbornness, but Religion only can give patience."

The Yale edition of the Idler reveals that the death Johnson was writing about was that of his mother, who died on 20 or 21 January 1759.

"Nothing is more evident than that the decays of age must terminate in death; yet there is no man, says Tully, who does not believe that he may yet live another year; and there is none who does not, upon the same principle, hope another year for his parent or his friend: but the fallacy will be in time detected; the last year, the last day, must come. It has come, and is past. The life which made my own life pleasant is at an end, and the gates of death are shut upon my prospects."

=== No 42. Perdita's complaint of her father (authorship uncertain) ===
Published: Saturday, 3 February 1759

The writer describes how her father has destroyed her reputation. Because she is a beauty, he allowed her only a minimal education, and insists on showing her off in the hope of finding her a rich husband. Yet he also fills his house with "drunkenness, riot, and irreligion", so that his daughter is no longer received in polite society.

"It is a common opinion, he himself must very well know, that vices, like diseases, are often hereditary; and that the property of the one is to infect the manners, as the other poisons the springs of life."

=== No 43. Monitions on the flight of time (Johnson) ===
Published: Saturday, 10 February 1759

Johnson says the visible reminders of time's passing that we find in nature should persuade us not to procrastinate: "Let him that desires to see others happy make haste to give, while his gift can be enjoyed, and remember that every moment of delay takes away something from the value of his benefaction." Too often, however, this warning is given in vain.

"So little do we accustom ourselves to consider the effects of time, that things necessary and certain often surprise us like unexpected contingencies. We leave the beauty in her bloom, and, after an absence of twenty years, wonder, at our return, to find her faded. We meet those whom we left children, and can scarcely persuade ourselves to treat them as men. The traveller visits in age those countries through which he rambled in his youth, and hopes for merriment at the old place. The man of business, wearied with unsatisfactory prosperity, retires to the town of his nativity, and expects to play away the last years with the companions of his childhood, and recover youth in the fields, where he once was young."

=== No 44. The use of memory considered (Johnson) ===
Published: Saturday, 17 February 1759

Johnson praises memory, without which no other form of thought would be possible. There are two stages of memory in a person's life: collecting memories, and recollecting them. The first stage is by far the more pleasant. Recalling memories is always bittersweet, since "good and evil are linked together, and no pleasure recurs but associated with pain".

"Much of the pleasure which the first survey of the world affords, is exhausted before we are conscious of our own felicity, or able to compare our condition with some other possible state. We have, therefore, few traces of the joy of our earliest discoveries; yet we all remember a time, when nature had so many untasted gratifications, that every excursion gave delight which, can now be found no longer, when the noise of a torrent, the rustle of a wood, the song of birds, or the play of lambs, had power to fill the attention, and suspend all perception of the course of time."

=== No 45. On painting. Portraits defended (Johnson) ===
Published: Saturday, 24 February 1759

Some critics have called the English self-centred for preferring portraits to all other types of painting. Johnson says that, on the contrary, the preference springs from affection for others. Nonetheless, he believes other forms of painting should also be encouraged, and hopes that a prize recently offered for the best historical painting will produce good results. He considers various possible subjects for such a painting, and finally decides that Oliver Cromwell's dissolution of Parliament would be best.

"Genius is chiefly exerted in historical pictures; and the art of the painter of portraits is often lost in the obscurity of his subject. But it is in painting as in life; what is greatest is not always best. I should grieve to see Reynolds transfer to heroes and to goddesses, to empty splendour and to airy fiction, that art which is now employed in diffusing friendship, in reviving tenderness, in quickening the affections of the absent, and continuing the presence of the dead."

=== No 46. Molly Quick's complaint of her mistress (Johnson) ===
Published: Saturday, 3 March 1759

Molly Quick is waiting-maid to a great lady. Although her mistress treats her kindly and passes on her finest clothes, she has one habit that exasperates Molly: "She never orders any thing in direct words, for she loves a sharp girl that can take a hint".

"It is impossible to give a notion of this style otherwise than by examples. One night, when she had sat writing letters till it was time to be dressed, 'Molly', said she, 'the Ladies are all to be at Court to-night in white aprons.' When she means that I should send to order the chair, she says, 'I think the streets are clean, I may venture to walk.' When she would have something put into its place, she bids me 'lay it on the floor.' If she would have me snuff the candles, she asks 'whether I think her eyes are like a cat's?' If she thinks her chocolate delayed, she talks of 'the benefit of abstinence.' If any needle-work is forgotten, she supposes 'that I have heard of the lady who died by pricking her finger.'"

=== No 47. Deborah Ginger's account of city-wits (Johnson) ===
Published: 10 March 1759

Deborah Ginger, the wife of a "city wit", writes in despair. Her husband was once a successful shopkeeper, but since discovering the theatre, he disdains his business and spends all his time watching plays or writing his own.

"By this course of life our credit as traders is lessened; and I cannot forbear to suspect, that my husband's honour as a wit is not much advanced, for he seems to be always the lowest of the company, and is afraid to tell his opinion till the rest have spoken. When he was behind his counter, he used to be brisk, active, and jocular, like a man that knew what he was doing, and did not fear to look another in the face; but among wits and criticks he is timorous and awkward, and hangs down his head at his own table. Dear Mr. Idler, persuade him, if you can, to return once more to his native element. Tell him, that wit will never make him rich, but that there are places where riches will always make a wit."

=== No 48. The bustle of idleness described and ridiculed (Johnson) ===
Published: Saturday, 17 March 1759

Johnson returns to the subject of those who conceal their idleness by rushing aimlessly about. He considers two types: those who affect an interest in politics, and those who pretend to be learned.

"As political affairs are the highest and most extensive of temporal concerns, the mimick of a politician is more busy and important than any other trifler. Monsieur le Noir, a man who, without property or importance in any corner of the earth, has, in the present confusion of the world, declared himself a steady adherent to the French, is made miserable by a wind that keeps back the packet-boat, and still more miserable by every account of a Malouin privateer caught in his cruise; he knows well that nothing can be done or said by him which can produce any effect but that of laughter, that he can neither hasten nor retard good or evil, that his joys and sorrows have scarcely any partakers; yet such is his zeal, and such his curiosity, that he would run barefooted to Gravesend, for the sake of knowing first that the English had lost a tender, and would ride out to meet every mail from the continent, if he might be permitted to open it."

=== No 49. Marvel's journey narrated (Johnson) ===
Published: Saturday, 24 March 1759

Johnson recounts his friend Will Marvel's story of a visit to Devonshire. According to Marvel, it was a trek filled with danger and drama. On the first day of his travels it rained, even though fair weather was predicted. On the second day, the road was full of puddles, and on the third, he was bored and lonely. On the fourth day he rode until after dark, and then had to wait a long time for someone to open the turnpike. Such catastrophes continued throughout his journey.

"Such are the colours in which Marvel paints his adventures. He has accustomed himself to sounding words and hyperbolical images, till he has lost the power of true description. In a road, through which the heaviest carriages pass without difficulty, and the post-boy every day and night goes and returns, he meets with hardships like those which are endured in Siberian deserts, and misses nothing of romantick danger but a giant and a dragon. When his dreadful story is told in proper terms, it is only that the way was dirty in winter, and that he experienced the common vicissitudes of rain and sunshine."

=== No 50. Marvel's journey paralleled (Johnson) ===
Published: Saturday, 31 March 1759

Johnson says that in reality, all people are susceptible to the kind of exaggeration Marvel displayed. Exaggerating pleasures is forgivable, but exaggerating troubles is not.

"In the present state of the world man may pass through Shakespeare's seven stages of life, and meet nothing singular or wonderful. But such is every man's attention to himself, that what is common and unheeded, when it is only seen, becomes remarkable and peculiar when we happen to feel it."

=== No 51. Domestick greatness unattainable (Johnson) ===
Published: Saturday, 7 April 1759

Johnson says that no man is considered great in his own household, however illustrious he may appear to the outside world. People can display great powers only in extraordinary situations.

"But such is the constitution of the world, that much of life must be spent in the same manner by the wise and the ignorant, the exalted and the low. Men, however distinguished by external accidents or intrinsick qualities, have all the same wants, the same pains, and, as far as the senses are consulted, the same pleasures. The petty cares and petty duties are the same in every station to every understanding, and every hour brings some occasion on which we all sink to the common level. We are all naked till we are dressed, and hungry till we are fed; and the general's triumph, and sage's disputation, end, like the humble labours of the smith or ploughman, in a dinner or in sleep."

=== No 52. Self-denial necessary (Johnson) ===
Published: Saturday, 14 April 1759

Johnson says that although self-denial has been taken to ridiculous extremes by some religious sects, it is still necessary.

"To deny early and inflexibly, is the only art of checking the importunity of desire, and of preserving quiet and innocence. Innocent gratifications must be sometimes withheld; he that complies with all lawful desires will certainly lose his empire over himself, and, in time, either submit his reason to his wishes, and think all his desires lawful, or dismiss his reason as troublesome and intrusive, and resolve to snatch what he may happen to wish, without inquiring about right and wrong."

=== No 53. Mischiefs of good company (Johnson) ===
Published: Saturday, 24 April 1759

A husband complains that his wife insists on keeping "good company" — that is, the company of the rich and noble. After trying unsuccessfully for some time to foist herself upon them, she managed to gain acceptance from a few of the less savoury members of the aristocracy, and made her way up the social ladder from there. She now talks of nothing but her new social circle, models all her behaviour on theirs and has turned her back on her old friends.

"What adds to all this uneasiness is, that this expense is without use, and this vanity without honour; she forsakes houses where she might be courted, for those where she is only suffered; her equals are daily made her enemies, and her superiors will never be her friends."

=== No 54. Mrs Savecharges' complaint (authorship uncertain) ===
Published: Saturday, 28 April 1759

Sukey Savecharges, a bride of six months, writes asking for legal advice. In their marriage contract, her husband promised to buy her a coach. After they were married, he tried to talk her out of it, saying a coach would be too expensive to maintain. When she refused to relent, he bought her the coach, but told her she would have to pay for the horses herself. Sukey asks how she can annexe two horses to the contract.

"Now, though I am convinced I might make a worse use of part of the pin-money, than by extending my bounty towards the support of so useful a part of the brute creation; yet, like a true-born Englishwoman, I am so tenacious of my rights and privileges, and moreover so good a friend to the gentlemen of the law, that I protest, Mr Idler, sooner than tamely give up the point, and be quibbled out of my right, I will receive my pin-money, as it were, with one hand, and pay it to them with the other; provided they will give me, or, which is the same thing, my trustees, encouragement to commence a suit against this dear, frugal husband of mine."

=== No 55. Authors' mortifications (Johnson) ===
Published: Saturday, 5 May 1759

An author describes how he spent eight years researching a book on natural history. At first he read portions of his work in progress to his friends, but was discouraged by their criticism. He finished the work in secret and expected publishers to compete fiercely for the rights, but he found nothing but indifference. His book has still not been printed, and he has been indicted for kicking a publisher. He is convinced that his friends must have conspired against him, and asks the Idler what he should do.

"I took my lodgings near the house of the Royal Society, and expected every morning a visit from the president. I walked in the Park, and wondered that I overheard no mention of the great naturalist. At last I visited a noble earl, and told him of my work: he answered, that he was under an engagement never to subscribe. I was angry to have that refused which I did not mean to ask, and concealed my design of making him immortal. I went next day to another, and, in resentment of my late affront, offered to prefix his name to my new book. He said, coldly, that 'he did not understand those things'; another thought, 'there were too many books'; and another would 'talk with me when the races were over'."

=== No 56. Virtuosos whimsical (Johnson) ===
Published: Saturday, 12 May 1759

Johnson mocks the behaviour of collectors at an auction, and considers both the good and bad effects of collecting. On the one hand, it "fills the mind with trifling ambition"; on the other, it "brings many things to notice that would be neglected, and, by fixing the thoughts upon intellectual pleasures, resists the natural encroachments of sensuality."

"The novice is often surprised to see what minute and unimportant discriminations increase or diminish value. An irregular contortion of a turbinated shell, which common eyes pass unregarded, will ten times treble its price in the imagination of philosophers. Beauty is far from operating upon collectors as upon low and vulgar minds, even where beauty might be thought the only quality that could deserve notice. Among the shells that please by their variety of colours, if one can be found accidentally deformed by a cloudy spot, it is boasted as the pride of the collection. China is sometimes purchased for little less than its weight in gold, only because it is old, though neither less brittle, nor better painted, than the modern; and brown china is caught up with ecstasy, though no reason can be imagined for which it should be preferred to common vessels of common clay."

=== No 57. Character of Sophron (Johnson) ===
Published: Saturday, 19 May 1759

Johnson describes his companion Sophron ("wisdom"), who exemplifies prudence. He is frugal, never gossips, never takes sides in a dispute or gives advice. Yet while this approach to life has kept him safe from disadvantages, it has brought him no advantages either.

"Thus Sophron creeps along, neither loved nor hated, neither favoured nor opposed: he has never attempted to grow rich, for fear of growing poor; and has raised no friends, for fear of making enemies."

=== No 58. Expectations of pleasure frustrated (Johnson) ===
Published: Saturday, 26 May 1759

Johnson observes that "pleasure is very seldom found where it is sought". Gatherings of humourists are always disappointing because the premeditation kills merriment. Wit only succeeds when it is spontaneous. Likewise, pleasure trips and visits to old friends seldom live up to one's expectations.

"Merriment is always the effect of a sudden impression. The jest which is expected is already destroyed. The most active imagination will be sometimes torpid, under the frigid influence of melancholy, and sometimes occasions will be wanting to tempt the mind, however volatile, to sallies and excursions. Nothing was ever said with uncommon felicity, but by the co-operation of chance; and, therefore, wit, as well as valour, must be content to share its honours with fortune."

=== No 59. Books fall into neglect (Johnson) ===
Published: Saturday, 2 June 1759

Johnson discusses the fickleness of literary fame. Some authors' reputations fade because they were never deserved in the first place. Others became famous by writing about fashionable topics, and fell out of favour when people lost interest in their subject.

"He that writes upon general principles, or delivers universal truths, may hope to be often read, because his work will be equally useful at all times and in every country; but he cannot expect it to be received with eagerness, or to spread with rapidity, because desire can have no particular stimulation: that which is to be loved long, must be loved with reason rather than with passion. He that lays his labours out upon temporary subjects, easily finds readers, and quickly loses them; for what should make the book valued when the subject is no more?"

=== No 60. Minim the critic (Johnson) ===
Published: Saturday, 9 June 1759

To show how easy it is to become a critic, Johnson describes the career of Dick Minim. A former brewer's apprentice, Minim inherited a fortune and "resolved to be a man of wit and humour". He learned everything he needed to know about literature and drama by hanging around coffeehouses and listening to the gossip. By repeating the same platitudes as everyone else and pointing out the obvious, he earned an honoured place among critics.

"This profession has one recommendation peculiar to itself, that it gives vent to malignity without real mischief. No genius was ever blasted by the breath of criticks. The poison which, if confined, would have burst the heart, fumes away in empty hisses, and malice is set at ease with very little danger to merit. The critick is the only man whose triumph is without another's pain, and whose greatness does not rise upon another's ruin."

=== No 61. Minim the critic (Johnson) ===
Published: Saturday, 15 June 1759,.,

Minim's story continues. Having reached the zenith of his career, he decided that England needed an academy to set artistic standards, like those found on the continent. Until such an academy can be formed, he is serving as the president of a small critical society. He withholds judgement on new books until he sees how they succeed commercially, and he takes in aspiring authors to whom he gives clichéd and conflicting advice.

"Minim is not so confident of his rules of judgment as not very eagerly to catch new light from the name of the author. He is commonly so prudent as to spare those whom he cannot resist, unless, as will sometimes happen, he finds the publick combined against them. But a fresh pretender to fame he is strongly inclined to censure, till his own honour requires that he commend him. Till he knows the success of a composition, he intrenches himself in general terms; there are some new thoughts and beautiful passages, but there is likewise much which he would have advised the author to expunge. He has several favourite epithets, of which he has never settled the meaning, but which are very commodiously applied to books which he has not read, or cannot understand. One is 'manly', another is 'dry', another 'stiff', and another 'flimsy'; sometimes he discovers delicacy of style, and sometimes meets with 'strange expressions'."

=== No 62. Ranger's account of the vanity of riches (Johnson) ===
Published: Saturday, 23 June 1759

Tim Ranger writes to dispute the claim that money brings happiness. He lived the modest life of a scholar until he inherited a massive fortune from his uncle. He bought fine clothes, but found they brought him more anxiety than pleasure. He tried to be a rake, but found himself turning into a drunkard. He kept racing horses, but soon grew bored with it. He then began building a grand house, and then found that the architects were cheating him. He ends with a promise to conclude his history another time.

"But experience is the test by which all the philosophers of the present age agree, that speculation must be tried; and I may be, therefore, allowed to doubt the power of money, since I have been a long time rich, and have not yet found that riches can make me happy."

=== No 63. Progress of arts and language (Johnson) ===
Published: Saturday, 30 June 1759

Johnson says that art and language flourish only after basic human needs have been met. Both, however, progress "through improvement to degeneracy". The English language started out "artless and simple, unconnected and concise". Since the time of Chaucer, the language has steadily become far more refined, but there is now a danger of affectation.

"Then begin the arts of rhetorick and poetry, the regulation of figures, the selection of words, the modulation of periods, the graces of transition, the complication of clauses, and all the delicacies of style and subtilties of composition, useful while they advance perspicuity, and laudable while they increase pleasure, but easy to be refined by needless scrupulosity till they shall more embarrass the writer than assist the reader or delight him."

=== No 64. Ranger's complaint concluded (Johnson) ===
Published: Saturday, 7 July 1759

Tim Ranger (see no 62) continues his tale. After selling his racehorses, he resolved to be a "fine gentleman". He began frequenting coffeehouses, learned to force himself to laugh, and took up betting and the opera. He became patron to a famous violinist, but lost his patronage by refusing to bail him out of debtor's prison. He also tried sitting for his portrait, but none of the artists he found pleased him. After this he took up collecting shells and fossils, but the jealousy of his fellow collectors forced him out. Finally he sought popularity by giving lavish dinner parties, only to find himself under the thumb of his French cook. Despairing, he asks the Idler what he can do now.

"In this new scene of life my great labour was to learn to laugh. I had been used to consider laughter as the effect of merriment; but I soon learned that it is one of the arts of adulation, and, from laughing only to show that I was pleased, I now began to laugh when I wished to please. This was at first very difficult. I sometimes heard the story with dull indifference, and, not exalting myself to merriment by due gradations, burst out suddenly into an awkward noise, which was not always favourably interpreted. Sometimes I was behind the rest of the company, and lost the grace of laughing by delay, and sometimes, when I began at the right time, was deficient in loudness or in length. But, by diligent imitation of the best models, I attained at last such flexibility of muscles, that I was always a welcome auditor of a story, and got the reputation of a good-natured fellow."

=== No 65. Fate of posthumous works (Johnson) ===
Published: Saturday, 14 July 1759

The posthumous publication of the Earl of Clarendon's history of the English Civil War leads Johnson to consider the varying fates of posthumous works. Some authors leave their manuscripts to their heirs, only for the survivors to store them away or burn them for fuel. Other writers have their work mutilated by editors. Johnson advises that writers "tell us what they have learned while they are yet able to tell it, and trust their reputation only to themselves."

"Yet there are some works which the authors must consign unpublished to posterity, however uncertain be the event, however hopeless be the trust. He that writes the history of his own times, if he adheres steadily to truth, will write that which his own times will not easily endure. He must be content to reposite his book, till all private passions shall cease, and love and hatred give way to curiosity."

=== No 66. Loss of ancient writings (Johnson) ===
Published: Saturday, 21 July 1759

Johnson suggests that we should not lament the fact that so little ancient literature has survived. The "most esteemed" works of the time have come down to us, and if we had kept everything from antiquity, we would have no room for modern endeavours.

"Of the ancients, enough remains to excite our emulation and direct our endeavours. Many of the works which time has left us, we know to have been these that were most esteemed, and which antiquity itself considered as models; so that, having the originals, we may without much regret lose the imitations. The obscurity which the want of contemporary writers often produces, only darkens single passages, and those commonly of slight importance. The general tendency of every piece may be known; and though that diligence deserves praise which leaves nothing unexamined, yet its miscarriages are not much to be lamented; for the most useful truths are always universal, and unconnected with accidents and customs."

=== No 67. Scholar's journal (Langton) ===
Published: Saturday, 28 July 1759

Langton offers another fictional diary, this time of a scholar. The subject resolves to spend three days writing serious treatises on logic and the mind. Instead, he becomes distracted by reading, discussions with friends and watching life on the streets of London. As a consequence, he writes several poems he had not planned. Langton says the diary proves that people are more productive when they pursue what truly interests them.

The scholar Langton describes is suspected by the editors of the Yale edition of being Johnson himself, who had a "habit of making resolutions and condemning himself for breaking them".

"...when we contemplate the inquisitive nature of the human mind, and its perpetual impatience of all restraint, it may be doubted whether the faculties may not be contracted by confining the attention; and whether it may not sometimes be proper to risk the certainty of little for the chance of much. Acquisitions of knowledge, like blazes of genius, are often fortuitous. Those who had proposed to themselves a methodical course of reading, light by accident on a new book, which seizes their thoughts and kindles their curiosity, and opens an unexpected prospect, to which the way which they had prescribed to themselves would never have conducted them."

=== No 68. History of translation (Johnson) ===
Published: Saturday, 4 August 1759

Johnson reviews the history of translation, which he says is the most modern of the arts. (Much of what he says here has since been shown to be incorrect.)

"The Greeks for a time travelled into Egypt, but they translated no books from the Egyptian language; and when the Macedonians had overthrown the empire of Persia, the countries that became subject to Grecian dominion studied only the Grecian literature. The books of the conquered nations, if they had any among them, sunk into oblivion; Greece considered herself as the mistress, if not as the parent of arts, her language contained all that was supposed to be known, and, except the sacred writings of the Old Testament, I know not that the library of Alexandria adopted any thing from a foreign tongue."

=== No 69. History of translation (Johnson) ===
Published: Saturday, 11 August 1759

Johnson continues his history of translation. The art of translation into English began with Chaucer, who translated Boethius' Comforts of Philosophy. However, Johnson criticises this translation as "nothing higher than a version strictly literal". When William Caxton began printing books in English, he at first concentrated solely on translations of French works. Not until the Restoration, however, did translators switch their attention from literal accuracy to elegance.

"There is undoubtedly a mean to be observed. Dryden saw very early that closeness best preserved an author's sense, and that freedom best exhibited his spirit; he, therefore, will deserve the highest praise, who can give a representation at once faithful and pleasing, who can convey the same thoughts with the same graces, and who, when he translates, changes nothing but the language."

=== No 70. Hard words defended (Johnson) ===
Published: Saturday, 18 August 1759

Johnson says people who are confused by hard words in books should ask themselves whether it is the author's fault or theirs. An author writing for a learned audience is entitled to use harder words than one writing for the ignorant. Moreover, "every science and every trade" must of necessity have its own vocabulary. The simplest language is not always the clearest.

"That the vulgar express their thoughts clearly, is far from true; and what perspicuity can be found among them proceeds not from the easiness of their language, but the shallowness of their thoughts. He that sees a building as a common spectator, contents himself with relating that it is great or little, mean or splendid, lofty or low; all these words are intelligible and common, but they convey no distinct or limited ideas; if he attempts, without the terms of architecture, to delineate the parts, or enumerate the ornaments, his narration at once becomes unintelligible. The terms, indeed, generally displease, because they are understood by few; but they are little understood, only because few that look upon an edifice examine its parts, or analyse its columns into their members."

=== No 71. Dick Shifter's rural excursion (Johnson) ===
Published: Saturday, 25 August 1759

Dick Shifter, a native of Cheapside, decides to spend a summer in the country to find peace and simplicity. Instead, he finds that the food is bad, prices are high, newspapers are impossible to get, and the people treat him with suspicion. He returns to London after just five days.

"Finding his walks thus interrupted, he was inclined to ride, and, being pleased with the appearance of a horse that was grazing in a neighbouring meadow, inquired the owner, who warranted him sound, and would not sell him, but that he was too fine for a plain man. Dick paid down the price, and, riding out to enjoy the evening, fell with his new horse into a ditch; they got out with difficulty, and, as he was going to mount again, a countryman looked at the horse, and perceived him to be blind. Dick went to the seller, and demanded back his money; but was told, that a man who rented his ground must do the best for himself; that his landlord had his rent though the year was barren; and that, whether horses had eyes or no, he should sell them to the highest bidder."

=== No 72. Regulation of memory (Johnson) ===
Published: Saturday, 1 September 1759

Man has two problems with memory: he cannot remember the things he wants to remember, and he remembers things he would rather forget. Johnson thinks people would benefit more from increased forgetfulness than from increased memory. If we could stop brooding on painful and useless memories, we would be better able to learn things we need to know. People should try to banish troublesome memories by keeping busy with new pursuits.

"The incursions of troublesome thoughts are often violent and importunate; and it is not easy to a mind accustomed to their inroads to expel them immediately by putting better images into motion; but this enemy of quiet is above all others weakened by every defeat; the reflection which has been once overpowered and ejected, seldom returns with any formidable vehemence."

=== No 73. Tranquil's use of riches (Johnson) ===
Published: Saturday, 8 September 1759

Johnson says that although wealth is now a universal goal, it cannot buy any more happiness than it did when poverty was thought to be virtuous. He illustrates this point with the story of Tom Tranquil. Tom inherited a huge fortune when he came of age, and his friends set about spending it for him. He is, however, utterly indifferent to their choices.

"A companion, who had just learned the names of the Italian masters, runs from sale to sale, and buys pictures, for which Mr Tranquil pays, without inquiring where they shall be hung. Another fills his garden with statues, which Tranquil wishes away, but dares not remove. One of his friends is learning architecture by building him a house, which he passed by, and inquired to whom it belonged; another has been for three years digging canals and raising mounts, cutting trees down in one place, and planting them in another, on which Tranquil looks with a serene indifference, without asking what will be the cost. Another projector tells him that a waterwork, like that of Versailles, will complete the beauties of his seat, and lays his draughts before him: Tranquil turns his eyes upon them, and the artist begins his explanations; Tranquil raises no objections, but orders him to begin the work, that he may escape from talk which he does not understand."

=== No 74. Memory rarely deficient (Johnson) ===
Published: Saturday, 15 September 1759

Johnson says that nobody is ever satisfied with the quality of their memory, but that actual weakness of memory is fairly rare. He criticises those who mark their books, or copy passages in a commonplace book, to remember them better. It is better to pay close attention and enjoy what one is reading.

"It is the practice of many readers to note, in the margin of their books, the most important passages, the strongest arguments, or the brightest sentiments. Thus they load their minds with superfluous attention, repress the vehemence of curiosity by useless deliberation, and by frequent interruption break the current of narration or the chain of reason, and at last close the volume, and forget the passages and marks together."

=== No 75. Gelaleddin of Bassora (Johnson) ===
Published: Saturday, 22 September 1759

While studying in Bassora, Gelaleddin becomes celebrated for his scholarship and is offered a professor's post. Not wanting to spend his life in obscurity in a provincial town, he decides to go to Tauris, where he thinks he will achieve greater glory. Instead, he is received with indifference and cannot find work. He returns home, but finds that his cold reception in Tauris has caused the people of Bassora to think they must have over-rated his abilities.

"It was now known in the neighbourhood that Gelaleddin was returned, and he sat for some days in expectation that the learned would visit him for consultation, or the great for entertainment. But who will be pleased or instructed in the mansions of poverty? He then frequented places of publick resort, and endeavoured to attract notice by the copiousness of his talk. The sprightly were silenced, and went away to censure, in some other place, his arrogance and his pedantry; and the dull listened quietly for a while, and then wondered why any man should take pains to obtain so much knowledge which would never do him good."

=== No 76. False criticisms on painting (Reynolds) ===
Published: Saturday, 29 September 1759

Reynolds mocks critics and connoisseurs who apply narrow rules to painting. If a person does not have artistic sensibilities, rules will not take their place.

"'This', says he, 'is esteemed the most excellent of all the cartoons; what nobleness, what dignity, there is in that figure of St Paul! and yet what an addition to that nobleness could Raffaelle have given, had the art of contrast been known in his time! but, above all, the flowing line which constitutes grace and beauty! You would not have then seen an upright figure standing equally on both legs, and both hands stretched forward in the same direction, and his drapery, to all appearance, without the least art of disposition.' The following picture is the Charge to Peter. 'Here', says he, 'are twelve upright figures; what a pity it is that Raffaelle was not acquainted with the pyramidal principle! He would then have contrived the figures in the middle to have been on higher ground, or the figures at the extremities stooping or lying, which would not only have formed the group into the shape of a pyramid, but likewise contrasted the standing figures. Indeed,' added he, 'I have often lamented that so great a genius as Raffaelle had not lived in this enlightened age, since the art has been reduced to principles, and had had his education in one of the modern academies; what glorious works might we have then expected from his divine pencil!'"

This article seems to be a response to Benjamin Ralph's book, The School of Raphael (May 1759).

=== No 77. Easy writing (Johnson) ===
Published: Saturday, 6 October 1759

Johnson says that everyone admires easy poetry, but no one can define what it is. He suggests that it be defined as 'that in which natural thoughts are expressed without violence to the language,' and gives contrasting examples of easy and difficult poetry.

"It is the prerogative of easy poetry to be understood as long as the language lasts; but modes of speech, which owe their prevalence only to modish folly, or to the eminence of those that use them, die away with their inventors, and their meaning, in a few years, is no longer known."

=== No 78. Steady, Snug, Startle, Solid and Misty (Johnson) ===
Published: Saturday, 13 October 1759

A correspondent called Robin Spritely describes the conversation of five characters he met while visiting a mineral spring over the summer. Tom Steady is "a vehement assertor of uncontroverted truth"; Dick Snug interrupts stories to make trite observations; Will Startle responds to everything with hyperbolic expressions of disgust or delight; Jack Solid "utters nothing but quotations", though he has a limited store of them; and Dick Misty gives long and obscure explanations of mundane points.

"Dick Snug is a man of sly remark and pithy sententiousness: he never immerges himself in the stream of conversation, but lies to catch his companions in the eddy: he is often very successful in breaking narratives and confounding eloquence. A gentleman, giving the history of one of his acquaintance, made mention of a lady that had many lovers: 'Then', said Dick, 'she was either handsome or rich.' This observation being well received, Dick watched the progress of the tale; and, hearing of a man lost in a shipwreck, remarked, that 'no man was ever drowned upon dry land'."

=== No 79. Grand style of painting (Reynolds) ===
Published: Saturday, 20 October 1759

Reynolds says painters must aim at more than simply imitating nature. He claims that Dutch painting is inferior to Italian painting because the former focuses on "petty peculiarities", while the latter "attends only to the invariable, the great and general ideas." Michelangelo, "the Homer of painting", is also the least naturalistic of the great painters.

Imitate nature "is the invariable rule; but I know none who have explained in what manner this rule is to be understood; the consequence of which is, that every one takes it in the most obvious sense, that objects are represented naturally when they have such relief that they seem real. It may appear strange, perhaps, to hear this sense of the rule disputed; but it must be considered, that, if the excellency of a painter consisted only in this kind of imitation, painting must lose its rank, and be no longer considered as a liberal art, and sister to poetry, this imitation being merely mechanical, in which the slowest intellect is always sure to succeed best: for the painter of genius cannot stoop to drudgery, in which the understanding has no part; and what pretence has the art to claim kindred with poetry, but by its powers over the imagination?"

=== No 80. Ladies' journey to London (Johnson) ===
Published: Saturday, 27 October 1759

The upper classes are making their annual return to London after a summer in the countryside. The week before the homecoming has much anticipation. Most excited of all is "the virgin whom the last summer released from her governess" and who is appearing in London society for the first time. Johnson warns her that her expectations of "uninterrupted happiness" will be disappointed, but that she will have much to learn from the city if she opens her mind to it.

"The uniform necessities of human nature produce, in a great measure, uniformity of life, and for part of the day make one place like another; to dress and to undress, to eat and to sleep, are the same in London as in the country. The supernumerary hours have, indeed, a great variety both of pleasure and of pain. The stranger, gazed on by multitudes at her first appearance in the Park, is, perhaps, on the highest summit of female happiness; but how great is the anguish when the novelty of another face draws her worshippers away!"

=== No 81. Indian's speech to his countrymen (Johnson) ===
Published: Saturday, 3 November 1759

Johnson imagines an Indian chief's speech to his tribe as the British advance on Quebec. The Europeans who have stolen their land and oppressed them have now turned upon one another. The chief urges his people to "remember that the death of every European delivers the country from a tyrant and a robber; for what is the claim of either nation, but the claim of the vulture to the leveret, of the tiger to the fawn?"

"Some there are who boast their humanity, and content themselves to seize our chases and fisheries, who drive us from every tract of ground where fertility and pleasantness invite them to settle, and make no war upon us except when we intrude upon our own lands. Others pretend to have purchased a right of residence and tyranny; but surely the insolence of such bargains is more offensive than the avowed and open dominion of force. What reward can induce the possessour of a country to admit a stranger more powerful than himself? Fraud or terrour must operate in such contracts; either they promised protection which they never have afforded, or instruction which they never imparted."

=== No 82. The true idea of beauty (Reynolds) ===
Published: Saturday, 10 November 1759

Reynolds suggests that every animal and plant species, and every race of human beings, has a certain "fixed or determinate" form, and that the closer a particular specimen is to this form, the more beautiful we think it is. It is not possible to say that a particular species or race is more beautiful than another; we can only compare individuals within the same group.

"He who says a swan is more beautiful than a dove, means little more than that he has more pleasure in seeing a swan than a dove, either from the stateliness of its motions, or its being a more rare bird; and he who gives the preference to the dove, does it from some association of ideas of innocence that he always annexes to the dove; but, if he pretends to defend the preference he gives to one or the other by endeavouring to prove that this more beautiful form proceeds from a particular gradation of magnitude, undulation of a curve, or direction of a line, or whatever other conceit of his imagination he shall fix on as a criterion of form, he will be continually contradicting himself, and find at last, that the great Mother of Nature will not be subjected to such narrow rules. Among the various reasons why we prefer one part of her works to another, the most general, I believe, is habit and custom; custom makes, in a certain sense, white black, and black white; it is custom alone determines our preference of the colour of the Europeans to the Aethiopians; and they, for the same reason, prefer their own colour to ours."

=== No 83. Scruple, Wormwood, Sturdy and Gentle (Johnson) ===
Published: Saturday, 17 November 1759

The description of conversationalists at the mineral spring, which began in No 78 with "Steady, Snug, Startle, Solid, and Misty", continues with four new characters. Sim Scruple "lives in a continual equipoise of doubt" and is constantly questioning received ideas, while Dick Wormwood finds fault with every aspect of contemporary society. Bob Sturdy refuses to be swayed by argument or to justify his positions; he merely repeats his assertions again and again. On the other hand, Phil Gentle has no opinions of his own, but expresses agreement with everyone who speaks to him.

"Bob is the most formidable disputant of the whole company; for, without troubling himself to search for reasons, he tires his antagonist with repeated affirmations. When Bob has been attacked for an hour with all the powers of eloquence and reason, and his position appears to all but himself utterly untenable, he always closes the debate with his first declaration, introduced by a stout preface of contemptuous civility. 'All this is very judicious; you may talk, Sir, as you please; but I will still say what I said at first.'"

=== No 84. Biography, how best performed (Johnson) ===
Published: Saturday, 24 November 1759

Johnson says that autobiography is more valuable than biography, because it concerns the inner life as well as the outer. He says that the risk of writers falsifying their autobiographies is not as great as people suppose, because readers are vigilant against any signs of vanity.

"The mischievous consequences of vice and folly, of irregular desires and predominant passions, are best discovered by those relations which are levelled with the general surface of life, which tell not how any man became great, but how he was made happy; not how he lost the favour of his prince, but how he became discontented with himself."

=== No 85. Books multiplied by useless compilations (Johnson) ===
Published: Saturday, 1 December 1759

Johnson says that too many of the books being published are merely compilations of earlier works. Compilations can sometimes be useful, since 'particles of science are often very widely scattered,' but most of those being produced now 'only serve to distract choice without supplying any real want.'

"It is observed that 'a corrupt society has many laws'; I know not whether it is not equally true, that 'an ignorant age has many books'. When the treasures of ancient knowledge lie unexamined, and original authors are neglected and forgotten, compilers and plagiaries are encouraged, who give us again what we had before, and grow great by setting before us what our own sloth had hidden from our view."

=== No 86. Miss Heartless' want of a lodging (Johnson) ===
Published: Saturday, 8 December 1759

Peggy Heartless, a new bride, describes her and her husband's attempts to find a suitable flat in London. They have asked the advice of a friend, who rejects every place they look at for trivial reasons. In the meantime, they must endure the humiliation of living in lodgings on the second floor of a building.

"Inconveniencies are often balanced by some advantage: the elevation of my apartments furnished a subject for conversation, which, without some such help, we should have been in danger of wanting. Lady Stately told us how many years had passed since she climbed so many steps. Miss Airy ran to the window, and thought it charming to see the walkers so little in the street; and Miss Gentle went to try the same experiment, and screamed to find herself so far above the ground."

=== No 87. Amazonian bravery revived (Johnson) ===
Published: Saturday, 15 December 1759

Johnson says there is no chance of English women reviving the civilisation of the Amazons. Those English women who can live without men are not civil enough to one another to keep a society together.

"I do not mean to censure the ladies of England as defective in knowledge or in spirit, when I suppose them unlikely to revive the military honours of their sex. The character of the ancient Amazons was rather terrible than lovely; the hand could not be very delicate that was only employed in drawing the bow and brandishing the battle-axe; their power was maintained by cruelty, their courage was deformed by ferocity, and their example only shows that men and women live best together."

=== No 88. What have ye done? (Johnson) ===
Published: Saturday, 22 December 1759

Johnson says people who aim to do great things for humanity often end up feeling that they have not done as much as they should. This should not discourage us, however; the important thing is to do whatever we can.

"If I had ever found any of the self-contemners much irritated or pained by the consciousness of their meanness, I should have given them consolation by observing, that a little more than nothing is as much as can be expected from a being, who, with respect to the multitudes about him, is himself little more than nothing. Every man is obliged by the Supreme Master of the universe to improve all the opportunities of good which are afforded him, and to keep in continual activity such abilities as are bestowed upon him. But he has no reason to repine, though his abilities are small and his opportunities few. He that has improved the virtue, or advanced the happiness of one fellow-creature, he that has ascertained a single moral proposition, or added one useful experiment to natural knowledge, may be contented with his own performance, and, with respect to mortals like himself, may demand, like Augustus, to be dismissed at his departure with applause."

=== No 89. Physical evil moral good (Johnson) ===
Published: Saturday, 29 December 1759

Johnson says that the purpose of pain and misery is to encourage the development of virtue. Pain from overindulgence leads to sobriety; the misery that results from lawlessness causes laws and justice to be enforced; poverty encourages charity; and despair of earthly help causes people to turn to God.

"A state of innocence and happiness is so remote from all that we have ever seen, that though we can easily conceive it possible, and may, therefore, hope to attain it, yet our speculations upon it must be general and confused. We can discover that where there is universal innocence, there will probably be universal happiness; for, why should afflictions be permitted to infest beings who are not in danger of corruption from blessings, and where there is no use of terrour nor cause of punishment? But in a world like ours, where our senses assault us, and our hearts betray us, we should pass on from crime to crime, heedless and remorseless, if misery did not stand in our way, and our own pains admonish us of our folly."

=== No 90. Rhetorical action considered (Johnson) ===
Published: Saturday, 5 January 1760

Johnson comments on the fact that the English use less body language than other Europeans. Many tutors have sprung up offering to teach it, in the belief that it makes speech more persuasive. Johnson disputes this, saying such gestures are "useless and ostentatious".

"The use of English oratory is only at the bar, in the parliament, and in the church. Neither the judges of our laws nor the representatives of our people would be much affected by laboured gesticulation, or believe any man the more because he rolled his eyes, or puffed his cheeks, or spread abroad his arms, or stamped the ground, or thumped his breast, or turned his eyes sometimes to the ceiling and sometimes to the floor. Upon men intent only upon truth, the arm of an orator has little power; a credible testimony, or a cogent argument will overcome all the art of modulation, and all the violence of contortion."

=== No 91. Sufficiency of the English language (Johnson) ===
Published: Saturday, 12 January 1760

Johnson laments the English prejudice in favour of foreign authors and languages. English literature is much richer than English scholars give it credit for, and any art or science can be more easily learned in English than in a foreign language.

"The riches of the English language are much greater than they are commonly supposed. Many useful and valuable books lie buried in shops and libraries, unknown and unexamined, unless some lucky compiler opens them by chance, and finds an easy spoil of wit and learning. I am far from intending to insinuate, that other languages are not necessary to him who aspires to eminence, and whose whole life is devoted to study; but to him who reads only for amusement, or whose purpose is not to deck himself with the honours of literature, but to be qualified for domestick usefulness, and sit down content with subordinate reputation, we have authors sufficient to fill up all the vacancies of his time, and gratify most of his wishes for information."

=== No 92. Nature of cunning (Johnson) ===
Published: Saturday, 19 January 1760

Johnson says that people who cannot be wise try to be cunning instead; yet the two are as different as "twilight from open day". The cunning must always be furtive and fearful, while the wise are open and confident. Cunning people evade questions, pretend to be experts on subjects they know nothing about, and trust no one.

"He that walks in the sunshine goes boldly forward by the nearest way; he sees that where the path is straight and even, he may proceed in security, and where it is rough and crooked he easily complies with the turns, and avoids the obstructions. But the traveller in the dusk fears more as he sees less; he knows there may be danger, and, therefore, suspects that he is never safe, tries every step before he fixes his foot, and shrinks at every noise lest violence should approach him. Wisdom comprehends at once the end and the means, estimates easiness or difficulty, and is cautious or confident in due proportion. Cunning discovers little at a time, and has no other means of certainty than multiplication of stratagems and superfluity of suspicion. The man of cunning always considers that he can never be too safe, and, therefore, always keeps himself enveloped in a mist, impenetrable, as he hopes, to the eye of rivalry or curiosity."

=== No 93. Sam Softly's history (Warton) ===
Published: Saturday, 26 January 1760

Sam Softly, a sugar-baker, inherited a fortune and retired to a country house in Kentish Town. He spends his days driving around the countryside in his chaise, criticising the houses he passes and on the conduct of other drivers.

"Misapplied genius most commonly proves ridiculous. Had Sam, as Nature intended, contentedly continued in the calmer and less conspicuous pursuits of sugar-baking, he might have been a respectable and useful character. At present he dissipates his life in a specious idleness, which neither improves himself nor his friends. Those talents, which might have benefited society, he exposes to contempt by false pretensions. He affects pleasures which he cannot enjoy, and is acquainted only with those subjects on which he has no right to talk, and which it is no merit to understand."

=== No 94. Obstructions of learning (Johnson) ===
Published: Saturday, 2 February 1760

Johnson observes that learning is "at once honoured and neglected". Some do not have the time to pursue it; others are seduced by other entertainments; still others want to learn, but are discouraged by the "continual multiplication of books".

"It is the great excellence of learning, that it borrows very little from time or place; it is not confined to season or to climate, to cities or to the country, but may be cultivated and enjoyed where no other pleasure can be obtained. But this quality, which constitutes much of its value, is one occasion of neglect; what may be done at all times with equal propriety, is deferred from day to day, till the mind is gradually reconciled to the omission, and the attention is turned to other objects. Thus habitual idleness gains too much power to be conquered, and the soul shrinks from the idea of intellectual labour and intenseness of meditation."

=== No 95. Tim Wainscot's son a fine gentleman (Johnson) ===
Published: Saturday, 9 February 1760

Tim Wainscot, a widowed trader, writes to complain of his son's airs. The boy worked hard in the family shop until some friends made him feel ashamed of working in commerce. He now aspires to be a gentleman, neglects his work and squanders his father's money.

"All this is very provoking; and yet all this might be borne, if the boy could support his pretensions. But, whatever he may think, he is yet far from the accomplishments which he has endeavoured to purchase at so dear a rate. I have watched him in publick places. He sneaks in like a man that knows he is where he should not be; he is proud to catch the slightest salutation, and often claims it when it is not intended. Other men receive dignity from dress, but my booby looks always more meanly for his finery. Dear Mr. Idler, tell him what must at last become of a fop, whom pride will not suffer to be a trader, and whom long habits in a shop forbid to be a gentleman."

=== No 96. Hacho of Lapland (Warton) ===
Published: Saturday, 16 February 1760

Hacho, the king of Lapland, was a fierce warrior and a wise scholar until he discovered honey. After this, his tastes became gradually more refined until he lived a life of languor and pleasure-seeking. When the enemy invaded, he was unable to resist; he was killed and his kingdom conquered.

"Nor was he less celebrated for his prudence and wisdom. Two of his proverbs are yet remembered and repeated among Laplanders. To express the vigilance of the Supreme Being, he was wont to say, 'Odin's belt is always buckled'. To show that the most prosperous condition of life is often hazardous, his lesson was, 'When you slide on the smoothest ice, beware of pits beneath'. He consoled his countrymen, when they were once preparing to leave the frozen deserts of Lapland, and resolved to seek some warmer climate, by telling them, that the Eastern nations, notwithstanding their boasted fertility, passed every night amidst the horrours of anxious apprehension, and were inexpressibly affrighted, and almost stunned, every morning, with the noise of the sun while he was rising."

=== No 97. Narratives of travellers considered (Johnson) ===
Published: Saturday, 23 February 1760

Johnson observes that "few books disappoint their readers more than the narrations of travellers", as their content is usually either too general or too trivial. Travel writers "should remember that the great object of remark is human life".

"This is the common style of those sons of enterprise, who visit savage countries, and range through solitude and desolation; who pass a desert, and tell that it is sandy; who cross a valley, and find that it is green. There are others of more delicate sensibility, that visit only the realms of elegance and softness; that wander through Italian palaces, and amuse the gentle reader with catalogues of pictures; that hear masses in magnificent churches, and recount the number of the pillars or variegations of the pavement. And there are yet others, who, in disdain of trifles, copy inscriptions elegant and rude, ancient and modern; and transcribe into their book the walls of every edifice, sacred or civil. He that reads these books must consider his labour as its own reward; for he will find nothing on which attention can fix, or which memory can retain."

=== No 98. Sophia Heedful (authorship uncertain) ===
Published: Saturday, 1 March 1760

Sophia, the daughter of a gentleman, was taken in by her bachelor uncle after her father's death. Her uncle refused to consent to her marriage, and hinted that she would inherit his fortune. However, he died intestate, and the money went to a closer relative. Sophia does not know where to go; she is too well educated to be a servant, and too poor to associate with her former social circle.

"Thus excluded from all hopes of living in the manner with which I have so long flattered myself, I am doubtful what method I shall take to procure a decent maintenance. I have been educated in a manner that has set me above a state of servitude, and my situation renders me unfit for the company of those with whom I have hitherto conversed. But, though disappointed in my expectations, I do not despair. I will hope that assistance may still be obtained for innocent distress, and that friendship, though rare, is yet not impossible to be found."

=== No 99. Ortogrul of Basra (Johnson) ===
Published: Saturday, 8 March 1760

Ortogrul is wandering through the streets of Baghdad when he finds his way to the vizier's palace. Seeing the flattery in which the vizier revels, he makes up his mind to become rich. Advised in a dream to seek gradual increase of wealth, he becomes a merchant and works all his life to build up his fortune. Finally he attracts the fawning admirers he wanted, but they bring him no happiness because he cannot believe them.

"They tell thee that thou art wise; but what does wisdom avail with poverty? None will flatter the poor, and the wise have very little power of flattering themselves. That man is surely the most wretched of the sons of wretchedness, who lives with his own faults and follies always before him, and who has none to reconcile him to himself by praise and veneration."

=== No 100. The good sort of woman (Johnson) ===
Published: Saturday, 15 March 1760

After a long bachelorhood, Tim Warner resolved to marry "only in compliance with my reason". He drew up a list of "female virtues and vices" and sought a woman who would be evenly balanced between the two. He finally chose Miss Gentle, but after they were married, he found himself bored by her bland temperament.

"Every hour of the day has its employment inviolably appropriated; nor will any importunity persuade her to walk in the garden at the time which she has devoted to her needlework, or to sit up stairs in that part of the forenoon which she has accustomed herself to spend in the back parlour. She allows herself to sit half an hour after breakfast, and an hour after dinner; while I am talking or reading to her, she keeps her eye upon her watch, and when the minute of departure comes, will leave an argument unfinished, or the intrigue of a play unravelled. She once called me to supper when I was watching an eclipse, and summoned me at another time to bed when I was going to give directions at a fire."

=== No 101. Omar's plan of life (Johnson) ===
Published: Saturday, 22 March 1760

Caled, the son of the viceroy of Egypt, asks Omar, a wealthy lawyer, how he should plan his life. Omar says it is best not to make plans at all, and uses his own life as an example. He planned to spend ten years pursuing knowledge, then ten years travelling; then he would find a wife. He frittered away the time he had planned to spend learning, then tried to make up for it by intensively studying the law. As a result, he became highly valued at court, and could never get away from work to travel. Now he has had to retire because of ill health, and will die with none of his ambitions fulfilled.

"Such was my scheme, and such has been its consequence. With an insatiable thirst for knowledge, I trifled away the years of improvement; with a restless desire of seeing different countries, I have always resided in the same city; with the highest expectation of connubial felicity, I have lived unmarried; and with unalterable resolutions of contemplative retirement, I am going to die within the walls of Bagdat."

=== No 102. Authors inattentive to themselves (Johnson) ===
Published: Saturday, 29 March 1760

Johnson says most authors are too lazy to write their memoirs. He encourages more of them to do so, since the vicissitudes of literary fame make for an entertaining story.

"Success and miscarriage have the same effects in all conditions. The prosperous are feared, hated and flattered; and the unfortunate avoided, pitied and despised. No sooner is a book published than the writer may judge of the opinion of the world. If his acquaintance press round him in publick places, or salute him from the other side of the street; if invitations to dinner come thick upon him, and those with whom he dines keep him to supper; if the ladies turn to him when his coat is plain, and the footmen serve him with attention and alacrity; he may be sure that his work has been praised by some leader of literary fashions. Of declining reputation the symptoms are not less easily observed. If the author enters a coffee-house, he has a box to himself; if he calls at a bookseller's, the boy turns his back and, what is the most fatal of all prognosticks, authors will visit him in a morning, and talk to him hour after hour of the malevolence of criticks, the neglect of merit, the bad taste of the age and the candour of posterity."

This essay has the distinction of being among the first literary texts in English to have been published in direct Spanish translation. The translation, with some additions, appeared anonymously in 1764 in the Madrid weekly El novelero de los estrados, y tertulias, y Diario universal de las bagatelas.

=== No 103. Horrour of the last (Johnson) ===
Published: Saturday, 5 April 1760

Johnson wonders what his readers will think now that The Idler has come to an end. Since this last essay is being published during Holy Week, Johnson says he hopes it will cause readers to reflect that everything has an end – including human life and the current age.

"Though the Idler and his readers have contracted no close friendship, they are, perhaps, both unwilling to part. There are few things not purely evil, of which we can say, without some emotion of uneasiness, 'this is the last'. Those who never could agree together, shed tears when mutual discontent has determined them to final separation; of a place which has been frequently visited, though without pleasure, the last look is taken with heaviness of heart; and the Idler, with all his chilness of tranquillity, is not wholly unaffected by the thought that his last essay is now before him."
