= Sutterby =

Hamlet in the East Lindsey district of Lincolnshire, England

Coordinates: 53.23059°N 0.076119°E

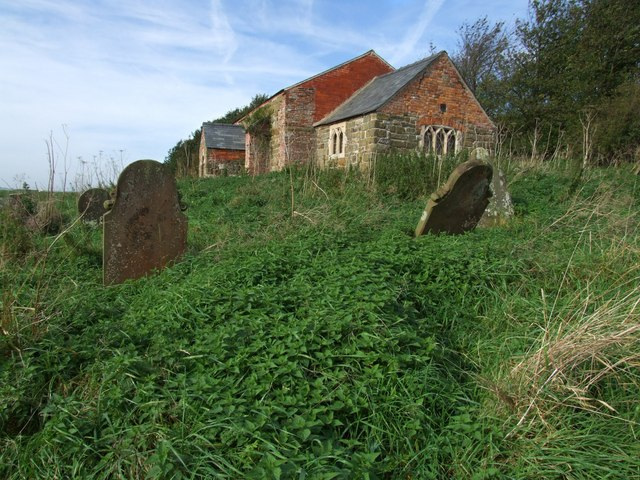
- St John the Baptist, Sutterby

- Location within Lincolnshire
- OS grid reference: TF386724
  - London: 115 mi (185 km) S
- Civil parish: Langton by Spilsby
- District: East Lindsey
- Shire county: Lincolnshire
- Region: East Midlands
- Country: England
- Sovereign state: United Kingdom
- Post town: Spilsby
- Postcode district: LN11
- Police: Lincolnshire
- Fire: Lincolnshire
- Ambulance: East Midlands
- UK Parliament: Louth and Horncastle

Sutterby is a hamlet in the civil parish of Langton by Spilsby, in the East Lindsey district of Lincolnshire, England. It is situated 9 miles (14 km) south-east from Louth and 8 miles (13 km) east from Horncastle. In 1931 the parish had a population of 24. On 1 April 1936 the parish was abolished and merged with Langton by Spilsby.

The first recorded mention of Sutterby is in the Domesday Book; the "-by" at the end of its name indicates this place may originally have been a Viking settlement (the village is located within the area of the Danelaw).

In 1219 Hugh of Wells, bishop of Lincoln, granted the church at Sutterby to the Benedictine Nuns of the Priory of Chester. It seems that the nuns had lost it, however, by the time of the Dissolution of the Monasteries. The Church of John the Baptist, is a Grade II listed building under the protection of the Friends of Friendless Churches.
