= Langton by Spilsby =

Village and civil parish in the East Lindsey district of Lincolnshire, England

Coordinates: 53.213068°N 0.083077°E

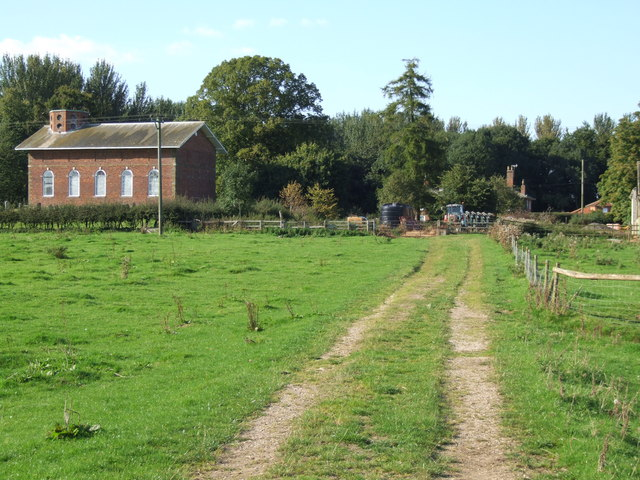
- Church of Saints Peter and Paul, Langton

- Location within Lincolnshire
- Population: 65 (2001)
- OS grid reference: TF392704
  - London: 120 mi (190 km) S
- District: East Lindsey
- Shire county: Lincolnshire
- Region: East Midlands
- Country: England
- Sovereign state: United Kingdom
- Post town: Spilsby
- Postcode district: PE23
- Police: Lincolnshire
- Fire: Lincolnshire
- Ambulance: East Midlands
- UK Parliament: Louth and Horncastle

Langton by Spilsby, sometimes called Langton by Partney, is a village and civil parish in the East Lindsey district of Lincolnshire, England. It is situated approximately 4 miles (6 km) north from the town of Spilsby, Lincolnshire. The civil parish includes the hamlet of Sutterby. From the 2011 census the population is included in the civil parish of Sausthorpe.

== History ==
In 1885 Kelly's Directory described Langton by Spilsby as "a village and parish situated in a picturesque valley", and having an 1881 population of 219. Three burial barrows and human bones were discovered close to the village at Spellow Hills. The then existing Langton Hall is described as a "noble structure" of brick and stone in Elizabethan style. It lay at the north of the village overlooking "picturesque country", sheltered to the north by "beautiful woods". Parish soil is noted to be sandy, with loam and chalk on the high ground. Crops grown in the 1,287 acres (5 km^{2}) parish were chiefly wheat, barley, oats, turnips, and seeds. A National School had been erected in 1849 – it held 60 children, and had an average attendance of 30. Commercial occupations noted were five farmers, a blacksmith, shoe maker, wheelwright, a publican at the Langton Arms public house, and a shopkeeper & carrier.

Langton Hall was destroyed by fire in 1405 and rebuilt in the 1550s. The Elizabethan manor lasted until about 1817 when it too was destroyed by fire. Bennet Rothes Langton erected the last Langton Hall to the designs of James Fowler, with grounds by Veitch and Son. in 1866–67, built of brick with stone dressings in the Elizabethan style. It was demolished about 1960.

Bennet Langton (c. 1736 - 1801) of Langton Hall was a writer, scholar, and friend of Samuel Johnson.

== Landmarks ==
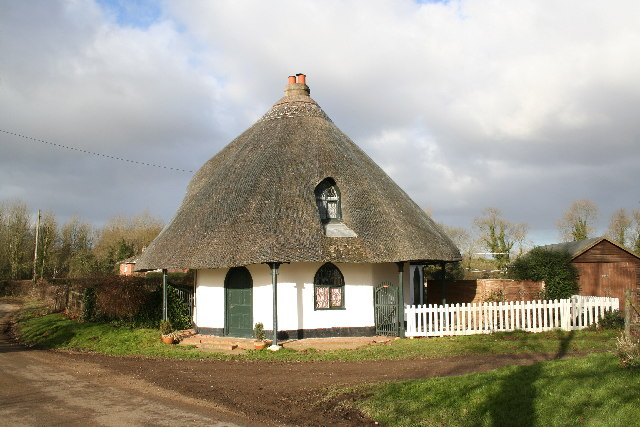
The Round House

The parish church is a Grade I listed building, and is dedicated to St Peter and St Paul and was built in 1725 of red brick after the previous church of St Peter burnt down.

The Old Rectory, a Grade II listed mid-18th-century red-brick house, with 19th-century additions, lies 87 yards (80 m) north from the church.

To the east of the church is The Round House, a Grade II listed cottage ornée built of whitewashed mud and stud, and thatched, dating from the early 19th century, English Heritage defines cottage ornee as "a rustic building of picturesque design".

At the north-east of the village is The Old Inn, also Grade II listed, which dates from the early 19th century, and is of whitewashed red brick. Formerly a public house it is now a private cottage.

== Community ==
Much of the land is owned by the Langton Estate, the family having owned the place which bears their name since the time of Henry II.

The ecclesiastical parish is Langton with Sutterby, a member of the Partney Group of parishes, within the Deanery of Bolingbroke. The incumbent is the Revd Richard Benson.

The parish church is credited with being the building described by John Betjeman in A Lincolnshire Tale.
