= Bennet Langton =

Samuel Johnson's friend

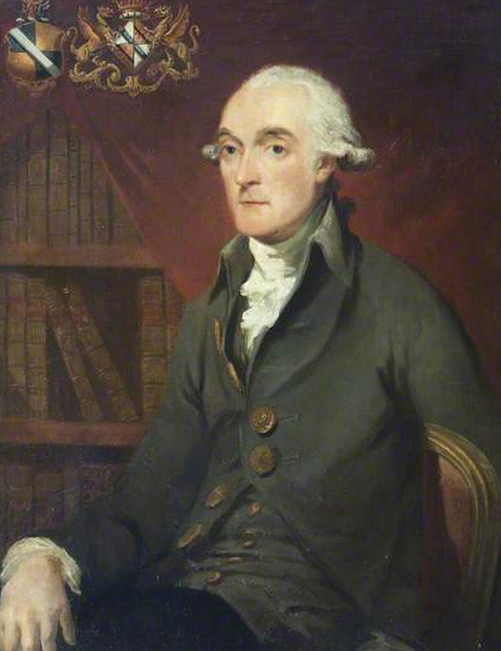
Bennet Langton by Carl Fredrik von Breda now owned by National Trust, Gunby Hall

Bennet Langton (c. 1736 – 1801) was an English writer and a founding member of the Literary Club. He is best known for his close friendship with writer Samuel Johnson and his numerous appearances in James Boswell's book The Life of Samuel Johnson.

== Life ==
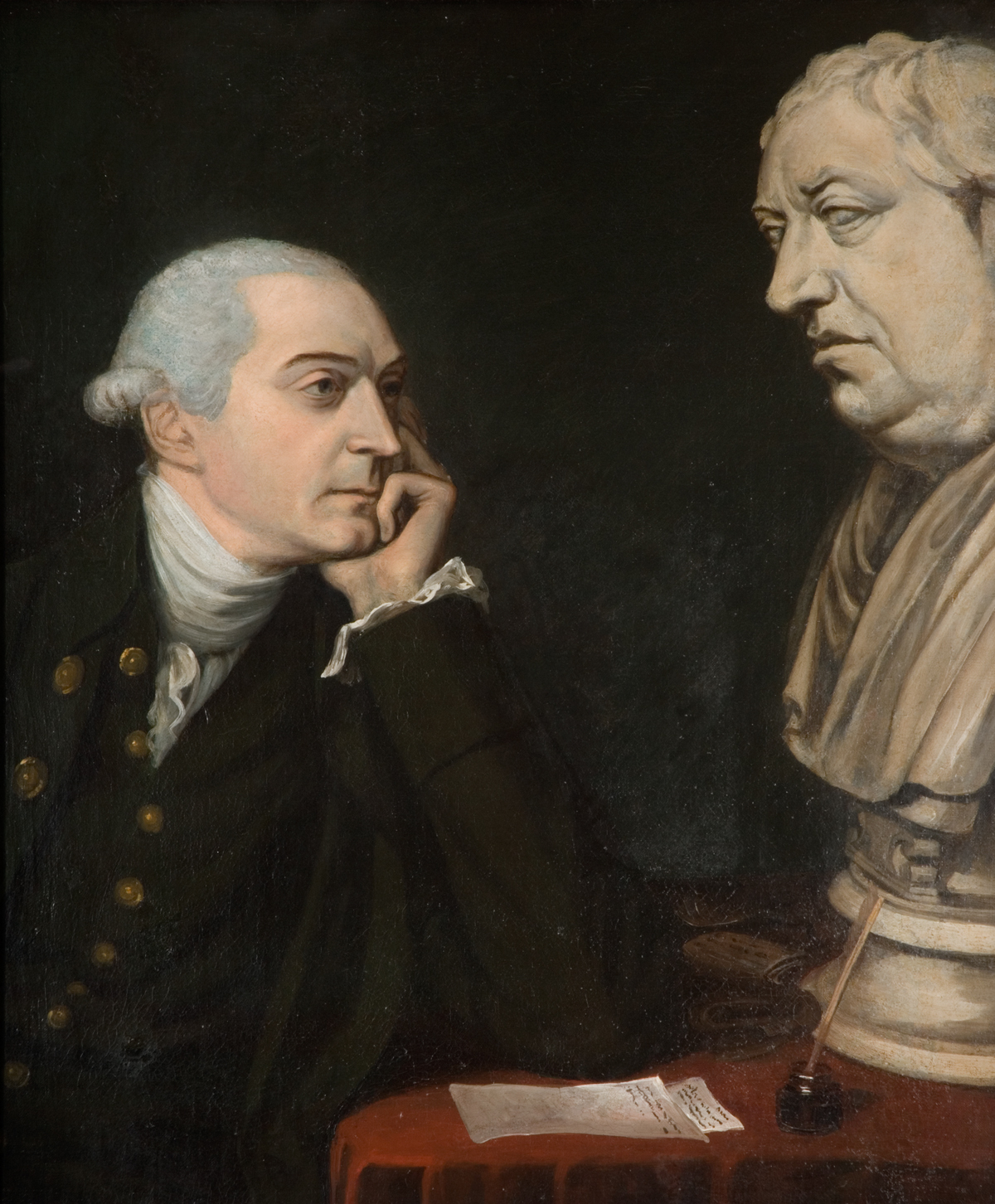
Bennet Langton Contemplating the Nollekens Bust of Johnson by Johann Zoffany

Langton was born to the Reverend Bennet Langton (1696–1769) and his wife, Diana, daughter of Edmund Torner of Stoke Rochford Hall in Lincolnshire, and descendant of the old family of the Langtons of Langton by Spilsby, Lincolnshire. He was baptised in York on 11 January 1736, and he graduated from Trinity College, Oxford in 1757.

He gained an introduction to Johnson as a young man due to his interest in The Rambler. He attended to Johnson during his last illness and was left a book in his will. Despite Johnson's poor opinion of Langton's laziness with respect to his own finances, he left Langton £750, from which he was expected to pay an annuity to Francis Barber who had been Johnson's servant.

He succeeded Johnson as professor of ancient literature at the Royal Academy.

Langton also contributed to The Idler. He died in Southampton on 18 December 1801. There is a painting of him by Joshua Reynolds and another by Johann Zoffany called Bennet Langton Contemplating the Nollekens Bust of Johnson which is now in the Samuel Johnson Birthplace Museum.

== Family ==
Langton married Mary, née Lloyd (died 1820), widow of John Leslie, 10th Earl of Rothes, at St Marylebone Parish Church in 1776 and they had nine children. His first son George (1772–1819) inherited his estate; and his second son, Peregrine, married into the Gunby Hall estate and changed his name to Massingberd.

== Sources ==
- Boswell, James (1998). Life of Johnson. ed. R. W. Chapman, intro. Pat Rogers. Oxford: Oxford University Press. ISBN 978-0-19-283531-4. OCLC 40816867.(subscription, Wikipedia Library access or UK public library membership required)
