= Temple Hauptfleisch =

South African playwright and academic

Temple Hauptfleisch is an internationally recognised South African playwright and academic, a professor emeritus of drama at Stellenbosch University.

Born in Bloemfontein on 27 June 1945, Haupfleisch was schooled at Grey College in Bloemfontein, spent a year as an AFS Exchange Student in Myrtle Point in Oregon, USA, then did his undergraduate studies at the University of the Orange Free State, graduating in 1966. He then went on to graduate studies at the University of South Africa, earning a master's degree in 1972 and a doctorate in 1978. Having worked as a researcher for the Human Sciences Research Council in Pretoria (1971-1987), he then joined the Drama Department in Stellenbosch as lecturer and researcher in 1988. He chaired the drama department from 1995 to 2005 and retired in 2010.

He is a co-founder (in 1987) and editor-in-chief of the South African Theatre Journal. and the founding editor and project leader of the Encyclopaedia of South African Theatre, Film, Media and Performance

He is the author of the book Theatre and Society in South Africa: Reflections in a Fractured Mirror (Pretoria: J. L. van Schaik, 1997), co-editor of Festivalizing! Theatrical Events, Politics and Culture (Amsterdam: Rodopi, 2007) and numerous articles and book chapters in a range of publications in international publications.

He is married to Karina Hauptfleisch and the couple have two children, business manager Anzel Mercker and playwright and director Gaerin Hauptfleisch.
