= Frederick Temple =

Archbishop of Canterbury from 1896 to 1902

The Most Reverend and Right Honourable Frederick Temple
- Archbishop of Canterbury
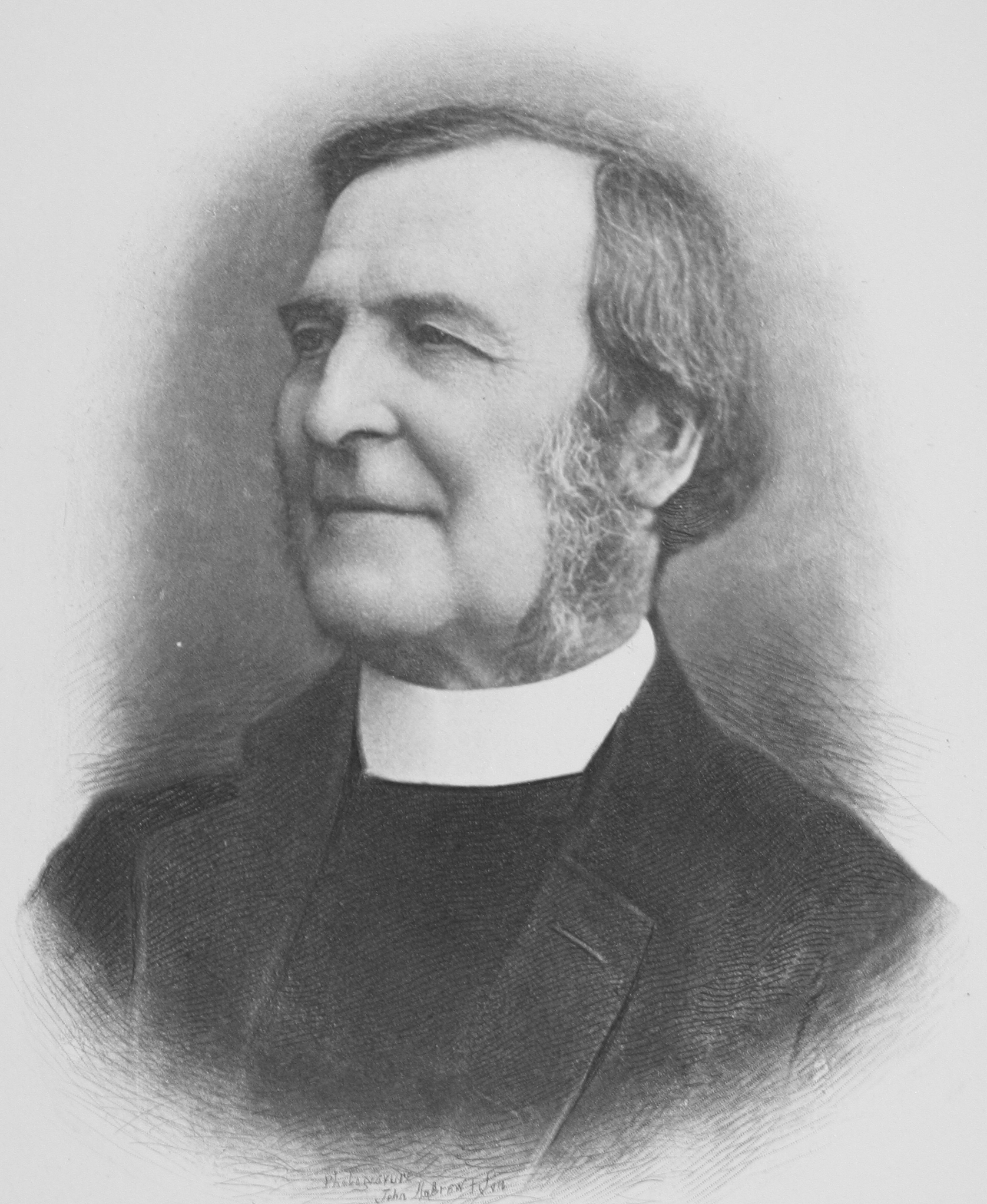
- 1900 portrait of Temple
- Church: Church of England
- Diocese: Canterbury
- Appointed: 1896
- Installed: 1896
- Term ended: 23 December 1902
- Predecessor: Edward White Benson
- Successor: Randall Davidson

Personal details
- Born: 30 November 1821 Santa Maura, Ionian Islands
- Died: 23 December 1902 (aged 81) London, England
- Buried: Canterbury Cathedral
- Denomination: Anglican
- Parents: Octavius Temple & Dorcas Carveth
- Spouse: Beatrice Blanche Lascelles
- Children: Frederick Charles Temple; William Temple
- Signature: Frederick Temple's signature

Ordination history of Frederick Temple
History
Diaconal ordination
- Ordained by: Samuel Wilberforce, Bishop of Oxford
- Date: 1846
Priestly ordination
- Ordained by: Samuel Wilberforce, Bishop of Oxford
- Date: 1847
Episcopal consecration
- Principal consecrator: John Jackson, Bishop of London
- Co-consecrators: Connop Thirlwall, Bishop of St David's; Harold Browne, Bishop of Ely
- Date: 21 December 1869
- Place: Westminster Abbey

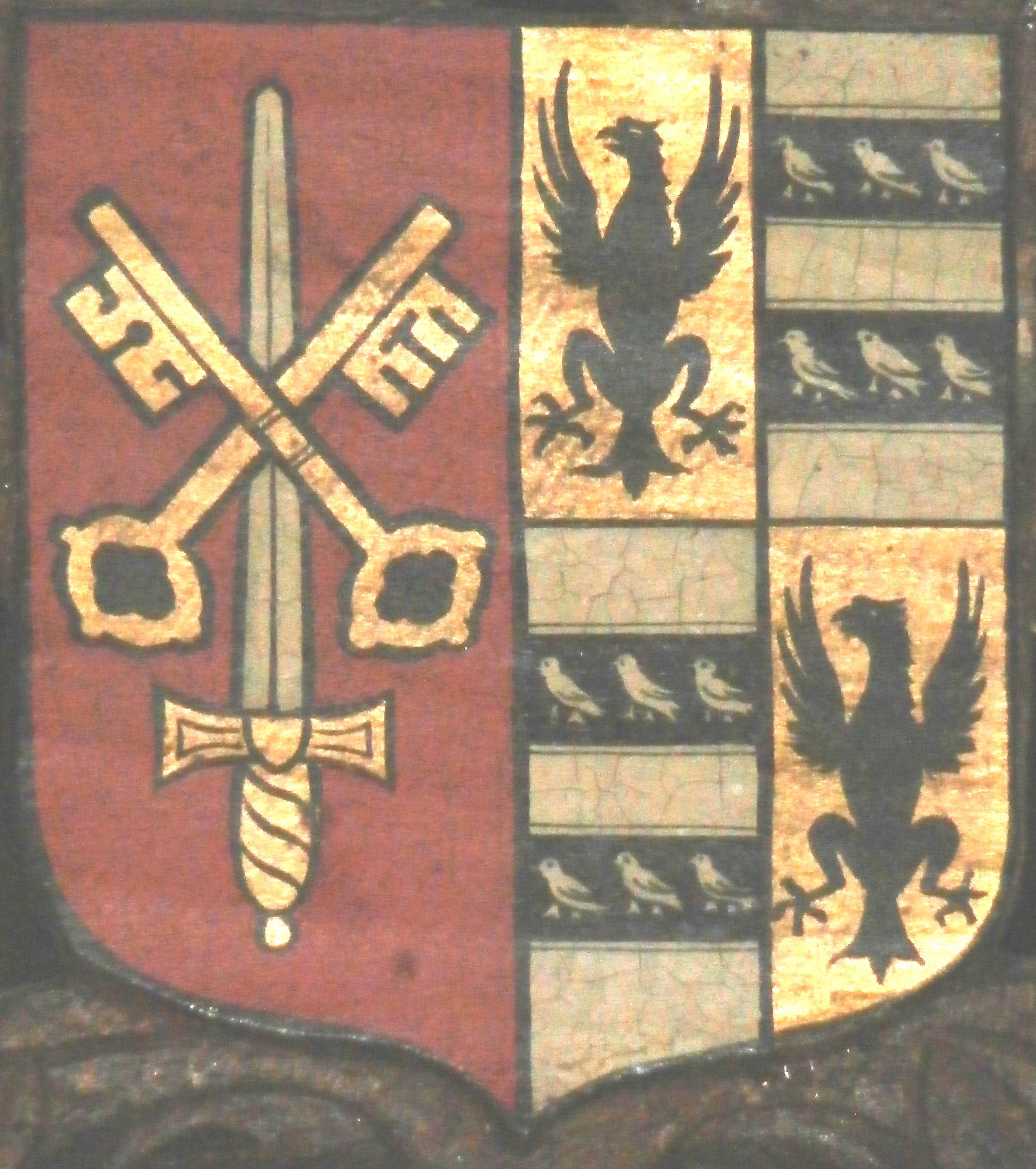
Arms of Frederick Temple, Bishop of Exeter. Escutcheon on screen of St Mary the Virgin Church, Washfield, Devon, which church was restored between 1871 and 1874, during his tenure as Bishop. The arms are the See of Exeter impaling Temple (as for Temple baronets and Viscount Cobham of Stowe House, Buckinghamshire): Or, an eagle displayed sable (Temple), quartering: Argent, two bars sable each charged with three martlets or (Temple)

Frederick Temple (30 November 1821 – 23 December 1902) was an English academic, teacher and churchman, who served as Bishop of Exeter (1869–1885), Bishop of London (1885–1896) and Archbishop of Canterbury (1896–1902).

== Early life ==
Temple was born in Santa Maura, one of the Ionian Islands, the son of Major Octavius Temple, who was subsequently appointed lieutenant-governor of Sierra Leone. On his retirement, Major Temple settled in Devon and contemplated a farming life for his son Frederick, giving him a practical training to that end.

Temple's grandfather was William Johnson Temple, Rector of Mamhead in Devon, who is mentioned several times in James Boswell's Life of Johnson.

Temple was sent to Blundell's School, Tiverton, and soon showed signs of being suited to a different career. He retained a warm affection for the school, where he did well both academically and at physical activities, especially walking. The family was not wealthy, and Temple knew he would have to earn his own living. He took the first step by winning a Blundell scholarship at Balliol College, Oxford, before he was seventeen.

The Tractarian Movement had begun five years earlier, but the memorable Tract 90 had not yet been written. In the intellectual and religious excitement, he drew closer to the camp of "the Oxford Liberal Movement." In 1842 he took a double first and was elected fellow of Balliol, and lecturer in mathematics and logic. Four years later he was ordained, and, with the aim of improving the education of the very poor, he accepted the headship of Kneller Hall, a college founded by the government for the training of masters of workhouses and penal schools. The experiment was not successful, and Temple himself advised its abandonment in 1855. He then accepted a school-inspectorship, which he held until he went to teach at Rugby School in 1858. In the meantime he had attracted the admiration of Prince Albert of Saxe-Coburg and Gotha, and in 1856 he was appointed Chaplain-in-Ordinary to Queen Victoria. In 1857 he was select preacher at his university.

== Rugby ==
At Rugby School, Thomas Arnold had died in 1842 and had been succeeded by Archibald Campbell Tait, who again was followed by Edward Meyrick Goulburn. Upon the resignation of the latter the trustees appointed Temple, who in that year (1858) had taken the degrees of B.D. and D.D. His life at Rugby School was marked by great energy and bold initiative.

Temple strengthened the school's academic reputation in the classics, but also instituted scholarships in natural science, built a laboratory, and recognised the importance of these subjects. He reformed the sporting activities, in spite of all the traditions of the playing fields. His own tremendous powers of work and rough manner intimidated the pupils, but he soon became popular, and raised the school's reputation. His school sermons made a deep impression on the boys, teaching loyalty, faith and duty.

It was two years after he had taken up his work at Rugby that the volume entitled Essays and Reviews caused a controversy. The first essay in the book, "The Education of the World," was by Temple. The authors of the volume were responsible only for their respective articles, but some of these were deemed so destructive that many people banned the whole book, and a noisy demand, led by Samuel Wilberforce, Bishop of Oxford, called on the headmaster of Rugby to dissociate himself from his comrades. Temple's essay had dealt with the intellectual and spiritual growth of the race, and had pointed out the contributions made respectively by the Hebrews, the Egyptians, the Greeks, the Romans, and others. Though accepted as harmless, it was blamed for being in the book. Temple refused to repudiate his associates, and it was only at a much later date (1870) that he decided to withdraw his essay. In the meantime, he printed a volume of his Rugby sermons, to show definitely what his own religious position was.

In politics Temple was a follower of William Ewart Gladstone, and he approved of the disestablishment of the Church of Ireland. He also wrote and spoke in favour of the Elementary Education Act 1870 of William Edward Forster, and was an active member of the Endowed Schools Commission.

In 1869, Gladstone offered him the deanery of Durham, but he declined because he wanted to stay at Rugby School. When later in the same year, however, Henry Phillpotts, bishop of Exeter, died, the prime minister turned again to Temple, and he accepted the bishopric of the city he knew so well.

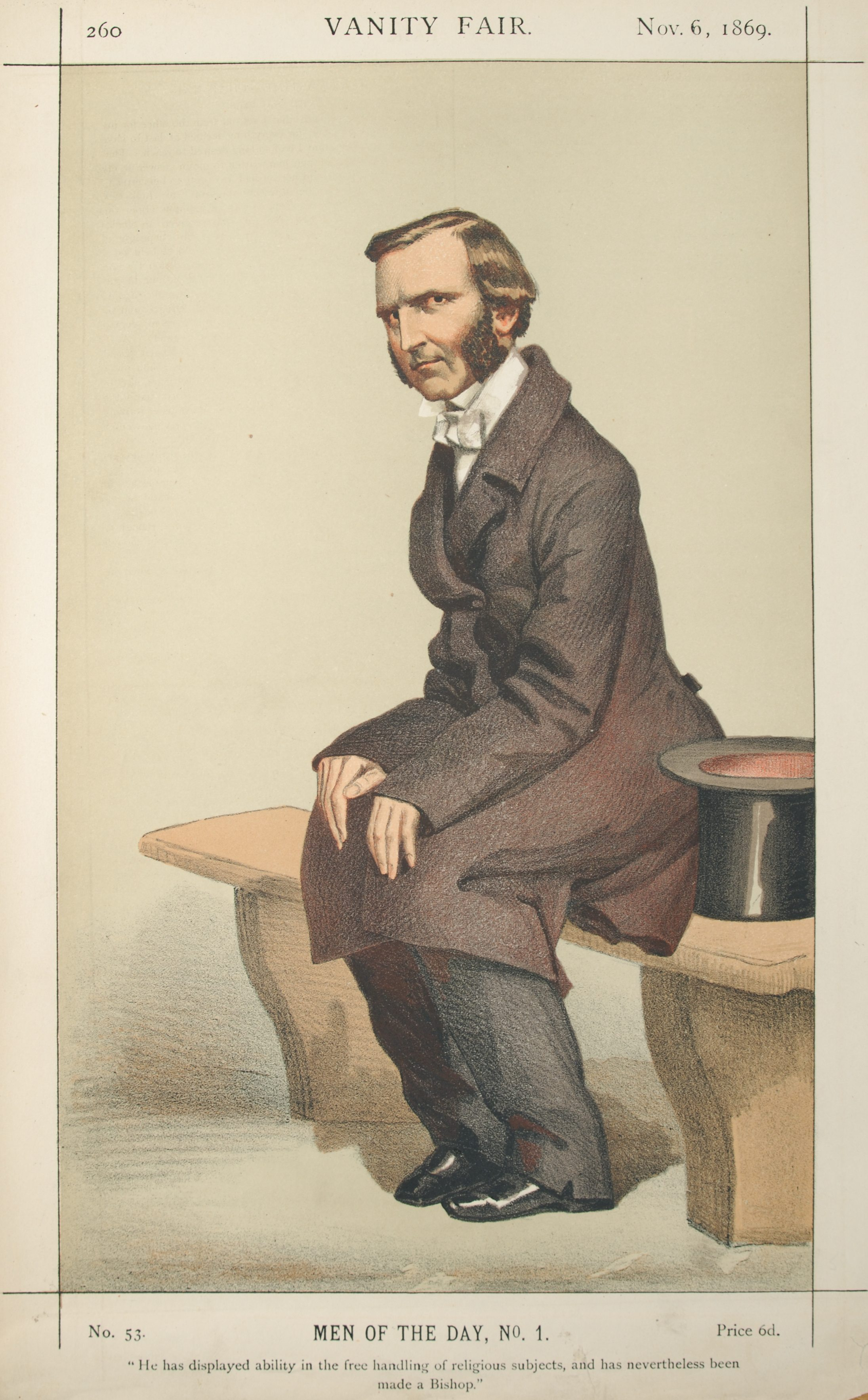
"He has displayed ability in the free handling of religious subjects, and has nevertheless been made a Bishop" As Bishop of Exeter, by "Coïdé" (James Tissot) in Vanity Fair, 1869

== Bishoprics ==
The appointment caused a fresh controversy; George Anthony Denison, Archdeacon of Taunton, Anthony Ashley Cooper, 7th Earl of Shaftesbury, and others formed a strong committee of protest, while Edward Pusey declared that "the choice was the most frightful enormity ever perpetrated by a prime minister". At the confirmation of his election, counsel was instructed by Bishop Walter Trower to object to it, and in the voting the chapter was divided. Gladstone stood firm, and Temple was consecrated on 21 December 1869, by John Jackson, Bishop of London. There were murmurings among his clergy against what they deemed his harsh control, but his real kindness soon made itself felt, and, during the sixteen years of his tenure, he overcame the prejudices against him, so that when, on the death of John Jackson in 1885, he was translated to London, the appointment gave general satisfaction. In 1884 he was Bampton Lecturer, taking for his subject "The Relations between Religion and Science." In 1885 he was elected honorary fellow of Exeter College, Oxford.

Temple's tenancy of the bishopric of London saw him working harder than ever. His normal working day at this time was one of fourteen or fifteen hours, though under the strain blindness was rapidly coming on. Many of his clergy and candidates for ordination thought him a rather terrifying person, enforcing almost impossible standards of diligence, accuracy and preaching efficiency, but his manifest devotion to his work and his zeal for the good of the people won him general confidence. In London he continued as a tireless temperance worker, and the working class instinctively recognised him as their friend. When, in view of his growing blindness, he offered to resign the bishopric, he was urged to reconsider his proposal, and on the sudden death of Edward White Benson in 1896, though now seventy-six years of age, he accepted the see of Canterbury. There is a memorial to him at St Paul's Cathedral.

Between 1871 and 1902 Temple was a governor of Sherborne School.

== Archbishop of Canterbury ==
As archbishop he presided in 1897 over the decennial Lambeth Conference. In the same year Temple and Archbishop of York William Maclagan issued a joint response to Apostolicae curae, a bull of Pope Leo XIII which denied the validity of Anglican orders. In 1899 the archbishops again acted together, when an appeal was addressed to them by the united episcopate, to rule on the use of incense in divine service and on the carrying of lights in liturgical processions. After hearing the arguments the two archbishops decided against both practices. During his archiepiscopate Temple was deeply distressed by the divisions which were weakening the Church of England, and many of his most memorable sermons were calls for unity.

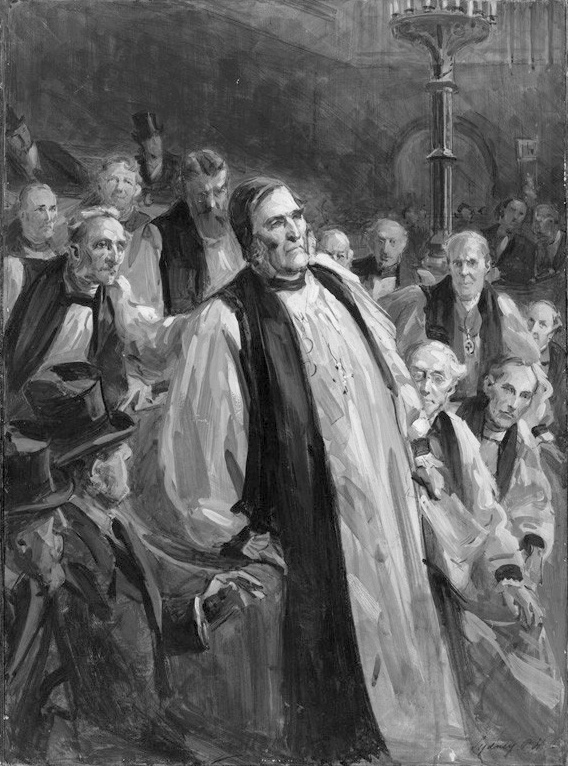
Painting by Sydney Prior Hall depicting Archbishop Temple's collapse in the House of Lords while delivering a speech on the Education Bill, 1902.

His first charge as primate on "Disputes in the Church" was felt to be a most powerful plea for a more catholic and a more charitable temper, and again and again during the closing years of his life he came back to this same theme. He was zealous also in the cause of foreign missions, and in a sermon preached at the opening of the new century he urged that a supreme obligation rested upon Britain at this epoch in the world's history to seek to evangelise all nations. In 1900 he presided over the World Temperance Congress in London, and on one occasion preached in the interests of women's education.

On 9 August 1902, he discharged the important duties of his office at the coronation of King Edward VII and Queen Alexandra, and two days later was received in private audience by the King and Queen to be presented with the Royal Victorian Chain, a new decoration founded by the King in honour of his mother. In early October that year he visited St. David's Theological College in Lampeter, Wales, for its 75th anniversary. The strain at his advanced age told upon his health, however. During a speech which he delivered in the House of Lords on 4 December 1902 on the Education Bill of that year, he was taken ill, and, though he revived sufficiently to finish his speech, he never fully recovered, and died on 23 December 1902. He was interred in Canterbury Cathedral four days later, where his grave is located in the cloister garden. His second son, William Temple, became Archbishop of Canterbury thirty-nine years later and is buried close to him.

== Science and religion ==
Temple had a lifelong interest in the relationship between science and religion. In 1860 at the famous meeting of the British Association which saw the debate between Thomas Huxley and Samuel Wilberforce, Temple preached a sermon welcoming the insights of evolution. In his Eight Bampton Lectures on the Relations between Religion and Science (1884) Temple stated clearly that "doctrine of Evolution is in no sense whatever antagonistic to the teachings of Religion". These lectures also addressed the origin and nature of scientific, and of religious belief and the apparent conflicts between science and religion on free will and supernatural power.

== Family ==
Temple married in 1876 Beatrice Blanche Lascelles (1844–1915), youngest daughter of Right Hon. William Lascelles (1798–1851), a Whig politician and son of the 2nd Earl of Harewood. Her mother was Lady Caroline Georgiana Howard (1803–1881), daughter of another Whig politician George Howard, 6th Earl of Carlisle. Beatrice Lascelles had nine elder siblings, including Lady Chesham, Lady Edward Cavendish, and the diplomat Sir Frank Lascelles.

They had two sons:

- Frederick Charles Temple (1879 - 1957), an engineer
- William Temple (1881–1944), Archbishop of York and Archbishop of Canterbury

== Memorials ==
The Temple Reading Room and Museum at Rugby School is named after him, and contains an 1869 bust of him by Thomas Woolner. There is a fine memorial in Canterbury Cathedral at the east end in the Corona depicting Temple kneeling in prayer. The West Window of Exeter Cathedral also depicts him amongst the great figures of the cathedral's history shown there.

A bust of Frederick Temple designed by Sir George Frampton is located outside the Big School Room at Sherborne School, where he served as governor from 1871 to 1902. The bust is inside a marble niche designed by Sir Reginald Blomfield which displays his coat of arms impaled with those of Exeter and Canterbury on the left and right respectively.

F. D. How included Temple in the 1904 book Six Great Schoolmasters.

== Honours ==
- 1842: Fellow of Balliol College, Oxford.
- 1885: Honorary Fellow of Exeter College, Oxford.
- 1897: Elected a member of the American Antiquarian Society.
- 1902: Awarded the Royal Victorian Chain by King Edward VII.

== Arms ==
Coat of arms of Frederick Temple, Archbishop of Canterbury
| Escutcheon Impaled - Dexter - Azure, an archepiscopal staff in pale or, ensigned with a cross patée argent, surmounted of a pall of the last, charged with four crosses formée fitchée sable, edged and fringed or (Archbishopric of Canterbury); Sinister - Quarterly 1st & 4th, Or, an eagle displayed sable (for Leofric, Earl of Mercia); 2nd & 3rd Argent, two bars sable, each charged with three martlets or (Temple). Other versions The archespicopal staff in the arms of the see of Canterbury is sometimes blazoned all or, or with the staff argent and cross or. |

== Notes ==
Church of England titles
| Preceded by Henry Phillpotts | Bishop of Exeter; 1869–1885 | Succeeded by Edward Henry Bickersteth |
| Preceded by John Jackson | Bishop of London; 1885–1896 | Succeeded by Mandell Creighton |
| Preceded by Edward White Benson | Archbishop of Canterbury; 1896–1902 | Succeeded by Randall Davidson |
