= William Johnson Temple =

English cleric and essayist (1739–1796)

William Johnson Temple (also Johnstone) (1739–1796) was an English cleric and essayist, now remembered mainly for his prolific correspondence with the biographer and diarist James Boswell. Temple was the grandfather of Frederick Temple and great-grandfather of William Temple, both Archbishops of Canterbury.

== Early life ==
William Johnson Temple was the son of William Temple of Allerdean, near Berwick-on-Tweed, where his father was mayor in 1750 and again in 1754. His mother was Sarah, daughter of Alexander Johnston of Newcastle upon Tyne, who died in 1747.

Temple was baptised at Berwick as "William Johnson" on 20 December 1739. He was a fellow-student at the University of Edinburgh with James Boswell, in the class of Robert Hunter, Professor of Greek. Their correspondence is in print from 29 July 1758, by which time Temple had left Edinburgh. On 22 May in that year, he was admitted pensioner at Trinity Hall, Cambridge, and on 5 February 1759, he became a scholar on that foundation. Temple's name was taken off the books on 20 November 1761, and he went to London: he and Boswell met as again law students at the end of 1762. Temple took chambers in Farrar's Buildings, at the bottom of Inner Temple Lane, and in July 1763, he lent these rooms to Boswell.

His father became bankrupt towards the close of 1763, and Temple contributed to him from the proceeds of the small estate which he had inherited from his mother. To enter the church, he returned to Trinity Hall, where he was admitted fellow-commoner on 22 June 1763, and took the degree of LL.B. on 28 June 1765, his name being taken off the books on 13 June 1766. Temple, while at Cambridge, became close friends to Thomas Gray. He remained in touch with Gray's circle, through Norton Nicholls.

== Churchman ==
During a visit to London in February 1766, Boswell introduced Temple to Samuel Johnson. On 14 September 1766, he was ordained deacon at Exeter, by Bishop Frederick Keppel, and on the following Sunday he was ordained priest by Keppel at a general ordination in the cathedral.The next day, on the presentation of Wilmot Vaughan, 4th Viscount Lisburne, whose family were connected with Berwick-on-Tweed, he was instituted to the rectory of Mamhead, adjoining Starcross, about ten miles from Exeter.

By August 1767, Temple was married to a lady with a fortune of £1,300, but the following year, after the bankruptcy of Fenwick Stow, he was again in financial trouble. He corrected Boswell's Account of Corsica (1768). In May 1770, Temple contemplated separating from his wife, and by the following November he had sold part of his estate. After proceeding to Northumberland on this business, he visited Boswell at Chessel's Buildings, Canongate, Edinburgh (September 1770). In the spring of 1771 he was looking for a chaplaincy abroad.

During a visit to London in May 1773, Temple dined at the house of Charles and Edward Dilly, the publishers in The Poultry, meeting Johnson, Oliver Goldsmith, Bennet Langton, Boswell, and others; and in April 1775, Boswell paid him a visit at Mamhead. In the meantime Temple published his first essay (1774); Bishop Keppel made him his chaplain, and by November 1775, he had received the promise of another living, St Gluvias with the chapelry of Budock. Temple lived as vicar of St Gluvias from 1776 until his death. In 1792, the Cornwall Library and Literary Society was founded, mainly through Temple, at Truro.

== Death ==
Temple died at St Gluvias on 13 August 1796. A monument in the churchyard was erected to the memory of their parents by "the seven remaining children". There, his second name is given as Johnstone.

== Views ==
Temple, as man of letters, compared literary London very unfavourably with Edinburgh. He did not at all share Boswell's adulation of Johnson, and in literary terms was more an ally of Gray and Horace Walpole. A hostile anonymous biographical work, The Character of Doctor Johnson (1792), has been attributed to Temple, the attribution rating only as "possible" in one authority. It is accepted as Temple's work by Thomas Crawford.

He preached against bull-baiting. Anti-religious views and a Socinian tendency expressed privately to Boswell in the late 1760s later dropped away. In politics, he held radical reforming views. He held those views until late in life when they were shaken by the outcomes of the French Revolution.

== Works ==
Temple's writings were:

- An Essay on the Clergy, their Studies, Recreations, Decline of Influence, 1774.
- On the Abuse of Unrestrained Power (anonymous), 1778.
- Moral and Historical Memoirs (anonymous), 1779, including Unrestrained Power.

These memoirs argued for less foreign travel, less luxury, and for less variety of reading.

- A short pamphlet on Jacobinism, 1792?.

Temple left unfinished a work on The Rise and Decline of Modern Rome. Some of his letters to Lord Lisburne are in the Egerton MS. His diaries were published in 1929.

== Boswell correspondence ==
A character of Thomas Gray was written by Temple in a letter to Boswell a short time after the poet's death (30 July 1771), and was published by him without permission in the London Magazine for 1772. William Mason incorporated it in his Life of Gray, and Johnson included it in his memoir of Gray in Lives of the Poets.

The Boswell–Temple correspondence was reconstructed and edited over the 19th and early 20th century. A scholarly edition appeared in 1997. The correspondence was discovered by chance in Boulogne in the late 1830s. The Letters of James Boswell, addressed to the Rev. W. J. Temple, appeared in 1856, anonymously edited by Philip Francis the barrister; this edition contained 97 letters, and was a mainstay of Boswell biography. There was another edition in 1908 by Thomas Seccombe. There was an edition of Boswell's letters in 1924 by Chauncey Brewster Tinker; it was flawed as previous editions were by suppression. Some further letters of Boswell to Temple, and 338 from Temple to Boswell, came to light in the 20th century.

== Family ==
Temple married Anne Stow, daughter of William Stow and Anne née Blake, sister of Sir Francis Blake. She died on 14 March 1793, aged 46; they had issue in all eleven children (DNB), or eight (ODNB). One son, Francis Temple (died 19 January 1863), became vice-admiral; another, Octavius Temple (died 13 August 1834), was governor of Sierra Leone, and father of Frederick Temple.
