= Octavius Temple =

British colonial official (1784–1834)

Octavius Temple (1784–1834), was Lieutenant Governor of Sierra Leone and Superintendent General of the Liberated Africans Department (1833), British soldier and colonial official.

== Family life ==
Temple was the youngest son of Rev. William Johnston Temple and Anne Stow. He was born and raised in Cornwall. In 1805 Temple married Dorcas Carveth in Cornwall. The couple had been introduced by Temple's godfather Sir Christopher Hawkins (Bart) MP. They had fifteen children, 8 of whom survived. In 1830 Temple and purchased a farm - Axon, near Culmstock (now part of Tiverton), Devon whilst in England between postings. He was the father of Frederick Temple and grandfather of William Temple, both Archbishops of Canterbury.

== Military career ==
Commissioned Ensign in 4th Foot 1799.

Lieutenant in the 4th and 48th.

Captain in the 38th and 14th.

Brevet Major on 4 June 1814. His battalion, the 2nd, formed part of the force sent from Genoa to hold Marseille during the Waterloo campaign. The 3rd battalion of his regiment was at Waterloo.

After the war he was stationed in Malta.

== Colonial career ==
Autumn 1819 in the Ionian Islands as sub-inspector of militia.

1820 resident in Santa Maura, Ionian Islands, for the Lord High Commissioner.

1828 he was transferred to Corfu as Administrator of the ecclesiastical and municipal revenues.

November 1833 he accepted the Governorship of Sierra Leone.

On his death on 13 August 1834, a dispatch was sent from the Secretary of State to the officer administering the government of Sierra Leone, which read

"His Majesty (William IV) has received with much regret the intelligence of Lieutenant-Governor Temple's death, and has been pleased to approve of the measures which were taken to honour the memory of that meritorious officer".

He was buried in Circular Road Cemetery.
