= Lives of the Most Eminent English Poets =

1779–81 book by Samuel Johnson

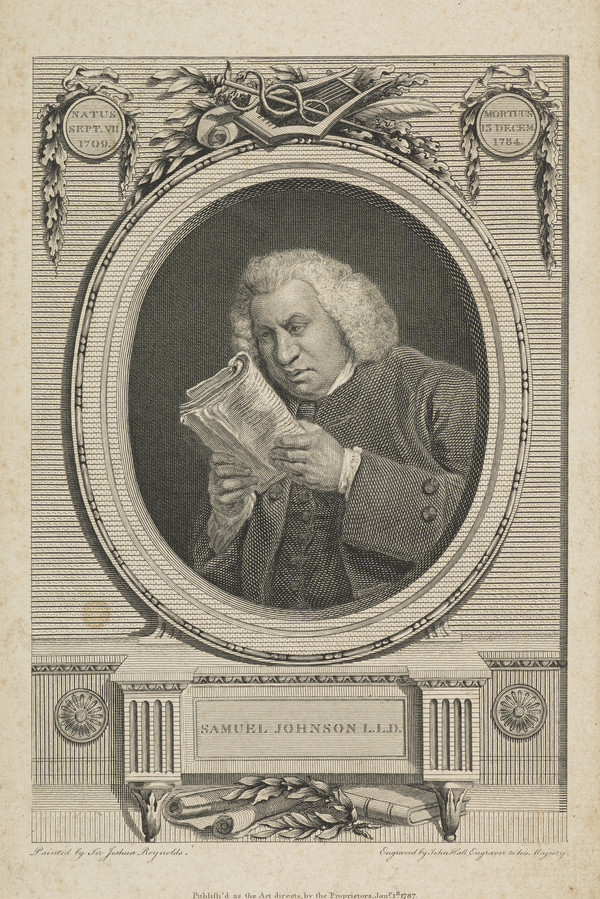
A print of Samuel Johnson, based on a portrait by Joshua Reynolds, later used in the 1806 edition of the Lives of the Poets

Lives of the Most Eminent English Poets (1779–81), alternatively known by the shorter title Lives of the Poets, is a work by Samuel Johnson comprising short biographies and critical appraisals of 52 poets, most of whom lived during the eighteenth century. These were arranged, approximately, by date of death.

From the close of the 18th century, expanded editions and updates of Johnson's work began to appear.

== Background ==
Johnson began writing individual biographical pieces in 1740, the first being devoted to Jean-Philippe Baratier, Robert Blake, and Francis Drake. In 1744 he wrote his first extended literary biography, the Life of Mr Richard Savage, in honour of a friend who had died the year before.

Various accounts are given of how Johnson came to write his Lives of the Poets during an episode of anti-Scottish sentiment in England. As related in the preface to the 1891 edition of the Lives, Scottish publishers had started to produce editions of the collected works of various English poets and sell them in London, which was considered an invasion of copyright precedent. Then in 1777 the publisher John Bell proposed to bring out a 109-volume set of The Poets of Great Britain complete from Chaucer to Churchill, printed in Edinburgh at the rate of a volume a week. In order to compete with this project, Johnson was asked by a deputation of London publishers and booksellers, led by Thomas Davies, William Strahan and Thomas Cadell, to provide short biographies for a standard edition of poets in whom they had an interest. Johnson named a price of 200 guineas, an amount significantly lower than what he could have demanded. Soon afterwards, advertisements began to appear announcing “The English Poets, with a preface biographical and critical, to each author…elegantly printed in small pocket volumes, on a fine writing paper, ornamented with the heads of the respective authors, engraved by the most eminent artists”.

Johnson was slow to put pen to paper, although on 3 May 1777 he wrote to Boswell that he was busy preparing "little Lives and little Prefaces, to a little edition of the English Poets". When asked later by Boswell whether he would do this for "any dunce’s works, if they should ask him," Johnson replied, "Yes, sir; and say he was a dunce." However, while so engaged, he made a few suggestions of his own for inclusion, including the poems of John Pomfret, Thomas Yalden, Isaac Watts, Richard Blackmore’s The Creation and James Thomson’s The Seasons. But as the work progressed, many of the prefaces grew in length, further holding up progress. The format of these now included a narrative of the poet’s life, a summary of his character and a critical assessment of his main poems. Eventually the decision was taken in 1779 to issue 56 volumes of poets alone, for which the sheets were already printed, together with separate volumes of prefaces as and when Johnson completed them. At first the prefaces were only made available to subscribers to the full set of poets, but in March 1781 the collected prefaces were offered separately as a six-volume work under the present title.

== The Lives and their shortcomings ==
With some rare exceptions, almost all the prefaces were specially written for the series. The extended Life of Richard Savage of 1744 was incorporated with very few changes; an article on the Earl of Roscommon, previously published in The Gentleman's Magazine for May 1748, was worked over to conform to Johnson’s overall plan. An earlier “Dissertation on Pope’s Epitaphs” from 1756 was added to the end of the life of Alexander Pope and the character of William Collins had already appeared in The Poetical Calendar (1763). The life of Edward Young was written by Sir Herbert Croft at Johnson's request, since that baronet had known him well. There are also lengthy quotations from other authors, as for example the “Prefatory Discourse” to the work of John Philips written by his friend Edmund Smith.

Even though the choice of authors was limited to those who were dead, some among the most recently deceased were not included, notably Charles Churchill (of whom Johnson disapproved) and Oliver Goldsmith, but this may have been due to copyright issues in both cases. Women poets were comprehensively omitted and that fact too was to draw criticism. Indeed, it has been conjectured that the 1785 new edition of George Colman and Bonnell Thornton’s 2-volume Poems by Eminent Ladies (originally published in 1755) may have been meant as a conscious supplement to the all-male series.

Not all the details in the book have proved trustworthy, and many critical judgements were considered prejudiced and unequal, even at the time of publication. The Concise Oxford Companion to English Literature instances as examples "its strictures on Milton's Lycidas, Gray's Odes, and its evident prejudice against Swift", as well as the hostile characterisation of the Metaphysical style in the life of Abraham Cowley. Nor can Johnson's prejudices be palliated by the observation in The Cambridge History of English and American Literature that "he was much more interested in the man than in that part of him which is the author ...He claimed for it no exclusive privileges, nor held that the poet was a man apart to be measured by standards inapplicable to other men."

=== List of Lives ===
The poets included are:

- Abraham Cowley
- Sir John Denham
- John Milton
- Samuel Butler (Hudibras)
- John Wilmot, Earl of Rochester
- Wentworth Dillon, Earl of Roscommon
- Thomas Otway
- Edmund Waller
- John Pomfret
- Charles Sackville, Earl of Dorset
- George Stepney
- John Philips
- William Walsh
- John Dryden
- Edmund Smith
- Richard Duke
- William King
- Thomas Sprat
- Charles Montagu, Earl of Halifax
- Thomas Parnell
- Samuel Garth
- Nicholas Rowe
- Joseph Addison
- John Hughes
- John Sheffield, Duke of Buckingham
- Matthew Prior
- William Congreve
- Sir Richard Blackmore
- Elijah Fenton
- John Gay
- George Granville, Lord Lansdowne
- Thomas Yalden
- Thomas Tickell
- James Hammond
- William Somervile
- Richard Savage
- Jonathan Swift
- William Broome
- Alexander Pope
- Christopher Pitt
- James Thomson
- Isaac Watts
- Ambrose Philips
- Gilbert West
- William Collins
- John Dyer
- William Shenstone
- Edward Young
- David Mallet
- Mark Akenside
- Thomas Gray
- George, Lord Lyttelton

== Editorial responses ==
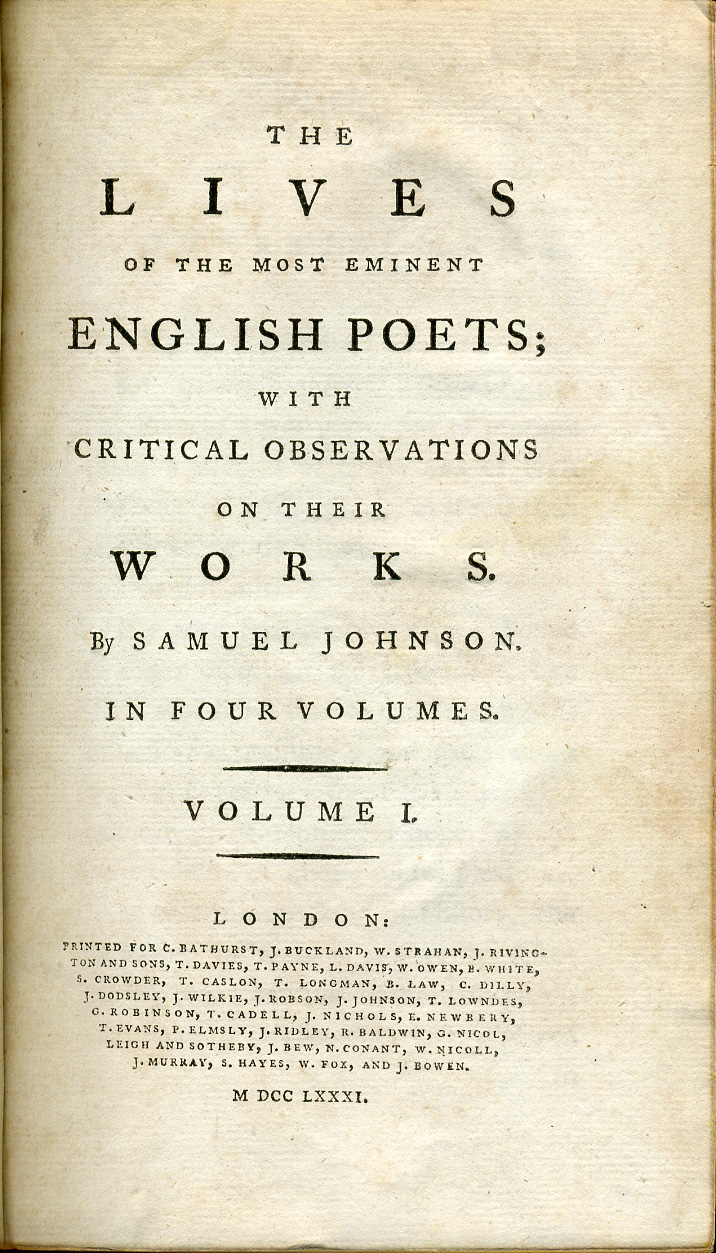
Title page of a 1781 edition of Samuel Johnson's Lives of the Poets

Although the quality of Johnson's writing has guaranteed the survival of his last considerable undertaking, its critical limitations generated published responses almost immediately. One of Johnson's own friends, John Scott, so differed in opinion with some of his judgments that he wrote essays of his own on individual works by John Denham, John Dyer, Milton, Pope, Collins, Goldsmith and Thomson which were published in 1785 under the title Critical Essays on Some of the Poems of Several English Poets. When dealing with Goldsmith's The Deserted Village he takes particular issue with the principles of inclusion in the collection of poets with which Johnson was associated: "The Temple of Fame, lately erected under the title of The Works of the English Poets, affords a striking instance of caprice in the matter of admission to literary honours", he charged. To Scott the choice of poets seemed lacking in either method or "rational impartial criticism" (p. 247).

In the same year appeared the new edition of Poems by the Most Eminent Ladies of Great Britain and Ireland…with considerable alterations, additions and improvements. It has been conjectured, as mentioned above, that a reissue of the work thirty years after its first publication was a response to the omission of any female poets from the recent collection. The 1785 editor does not say as much in the "Advertisement" and it is only by a comparison of the contents lists of the two that it becomes apparent that the new edition gives a less comprehensive choice of works in order to include more authors. Breadth of coverage in the 1785 edition demonstrates the variety of women poets rather than, as in the 1755 edition, the variety of writing by individual authors.

Between 1821 and 1824 Henry Francis Cary published several essays in The London Magazine, collected and posthumously published in 1846 under the title Lives of English poets, from Johnson to Kirke White, designed as a continuation of Johnson's Lives. These were unaccompanied by the works of the seventeen poets covered, apart from excerpts quoted in discussing their writing. The essays follow Johnson's tripartite exposition of biographical detail, character study and descriptive survey of the poetry, and begin with Johnson himself, at ninety pages in length by far the longest essay in the book. There his prose works as well as his poetry are discussed; in fact more pages are devoted to the Lives of the Poets than to Johnson's own performance as a poet. Oliver Goldsmith appears midway through the book and is given only twenty-four pages, less than those awarded William Mason and Erasmus Darwin, who precede and follow him. Where it is pertinent, Johnson's critical opinions are quoted (although not always approved), and in Goldsmith's case Johnsonian anecdotes are introduced.

== A body of the standard English poets ==
Robert Anderson prefaced his A complete edition of the poets of Great Britain (1795) with the statement that "When a new collection of English poetry is offered to the public, it will doubtless be inquired what are the deficiencies of preceding collections." To answer the question he went on to survey such anthologies over two centuries, noting in what ways they fell short of the completeness that he proposed. The ‘Johnson edition’ had failed in extensiveness by starting the English canon only in the second half of the 17th century. When it was augmented with the work of fourteen more poets in 1790, it still failed in inclusiveness, even over its allotted time-span; in addition, the biographical details of the added poets were skimped. What Anderson now proposed was a more ambitious set of poets, extending from Chaucer and covering the Tudor and early Stuart poets previously omitted, although in the event he was unable to include all that he wished. The selection also included more Scottish poets (though excluding dialect poetry) and two volumes of translations from the Classical writers. The accompanying biographies of the poets were written by Anderson himself.

From the point of view of comprehensive coverage, Alexander Chalmers advanced little beyond his predecessor in his The Works of the English Poets, from Chaucer to Cowper (1810). The main difference is that for those poets who appeared in the 'Johnson edition', Johnson's lives are retained. At this date it is conceded in the preface that, "after all the objections that have been offered, [they] must ever be the foundation of English poetical biography." By including them also there is an implied continuity between the volumes to which Johnson contributed and Chalmers' "work professing to be a Body of the Standard English Poets".

== Later critical interpretations ==
Matthew Arnold, in his Six Chief Lives from Johnson's "Lives of the Poets" (1878), considered the Lives of Milton, Dryden, Pope, Addison, Swift, and Gray as "points which stand as so many natural centres, and by returning to which we can always find our way again" and also as a model for Arnold's "ideal of liberal education", representing "a crucial century and a half in English literature". For Arnold the whole work, focusing on these six, formed a "compendious story of a whole important age in English literature, told by a great man, and in a performance which is itself a piece of English literature of the first class".

In mentioning this reading of Johnson's Lives at the start of his own article in The Cambridge Companion to Samuel Johnson, Greg Clingham describes the topics covered there as "like a list of most of the important issues in literary history during the years 1600–1781" as well as something like a social, philosophical and political history of that era. But Philip Smallwood, commenting on the Lives in The Oxford Handbook of British Poetry, 1660-1800, nuances this by pointing out that Johnson did not set out to produce a literary history. His main preoccupation is with how literary work is in a state of flux and advanced by individuals writing within a historical context. Consideration of their lives is therefore justified as it helps the reader in a different time to appreciate the significance of the works described.

== Bibliography ==
- Arnold, Matthew (1972), Ricks, Christopher (ed.), Selected Criticism of Matthew Arnold, New York: New American Library, OCLC 6338231
- Bate, Walter Jackson (1977), Samuel Johnson, New York: Harcourt Brace Jovanovich, ISBN 0-15-179260-7
- Bonnell, Thomas F. The Most Disreputable Trade: Publishing the Classics of English Poetry 1765-1810, OUP 2008
- Boswell, James: The Life of Samuel Johnson, Musaicum Books 2017
- Lonsdale, Roger. Introduction to the 2006 edition of Johnson's "Lives" (Clarendon Press)
- Nichol Smith, David. "Johnson and Boswell" in The Cambridge History of English and American Literature 1913, Vol.X, sections 25–6 on Bartleby
