= Sandywell Park =

Country house in Andoversford, Gloucestershire, England

Coordinates: 51°52′51.240″N 1°58′52.824″W

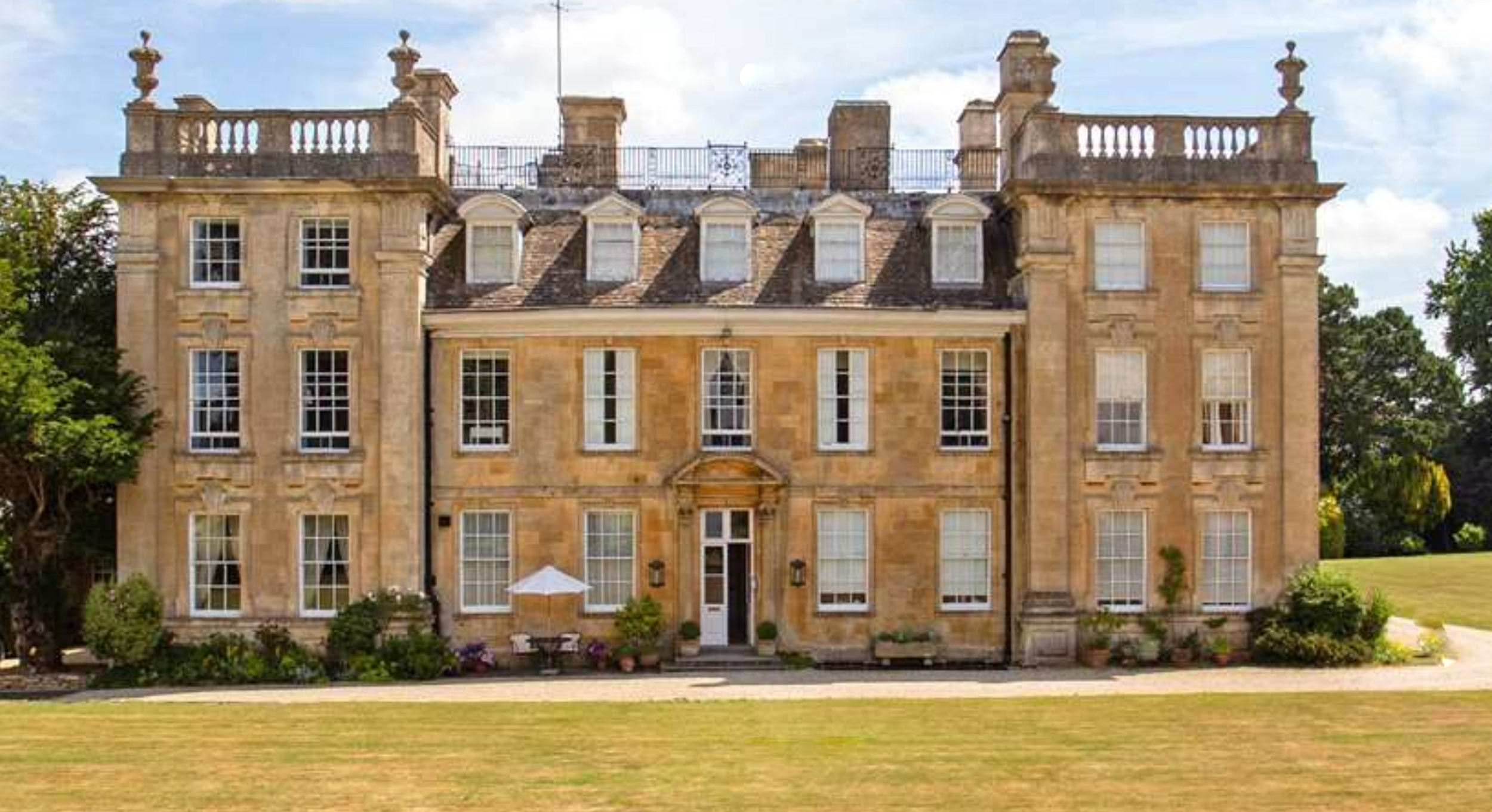
- Sandywell Park
- Interactive map of the Sandywell Park area

General information
- Location: Whittington, England
- Completed: 1704
- Client: Henry Brett

Sandywell Park is an Jacobean Georgian manor house, five miles east of Cheltenham in Gloucestershire, England. Built in 1704 by Henry Brett, it was extended a few times over the 18th century. In the mid-eighteenth century the Sandywell Park estate acquired the Whittington Court building. Sandywell Park is today a Grade II* listed building.

== Early residents ==
Henry Brett (1675-1724) built Sandywell Park in 1704. It was constructed on or near the site of an exiting house which was constructed in 1600. Henry was a very colourful character who came from wealthy landwowning family. He was educated at Oxford but showed little interest in his chosen profession of the law. His biographer describes him as “a country squire and man about town. He was a witty and charming companion, welcomed by the theatrical and literary celebrities whose society he sought.” He became a politician and one of his close friends made the following observation about the reason for this career. He said:

“As he had an uncommon share of social wit, and was a handsome person, with a sanguine bloom in his complexion, no wonder they persuaded him that he might have a better chance of fortune by throwing such accomplishments into the gayer world (of politics) than by shutting them up in a study.”

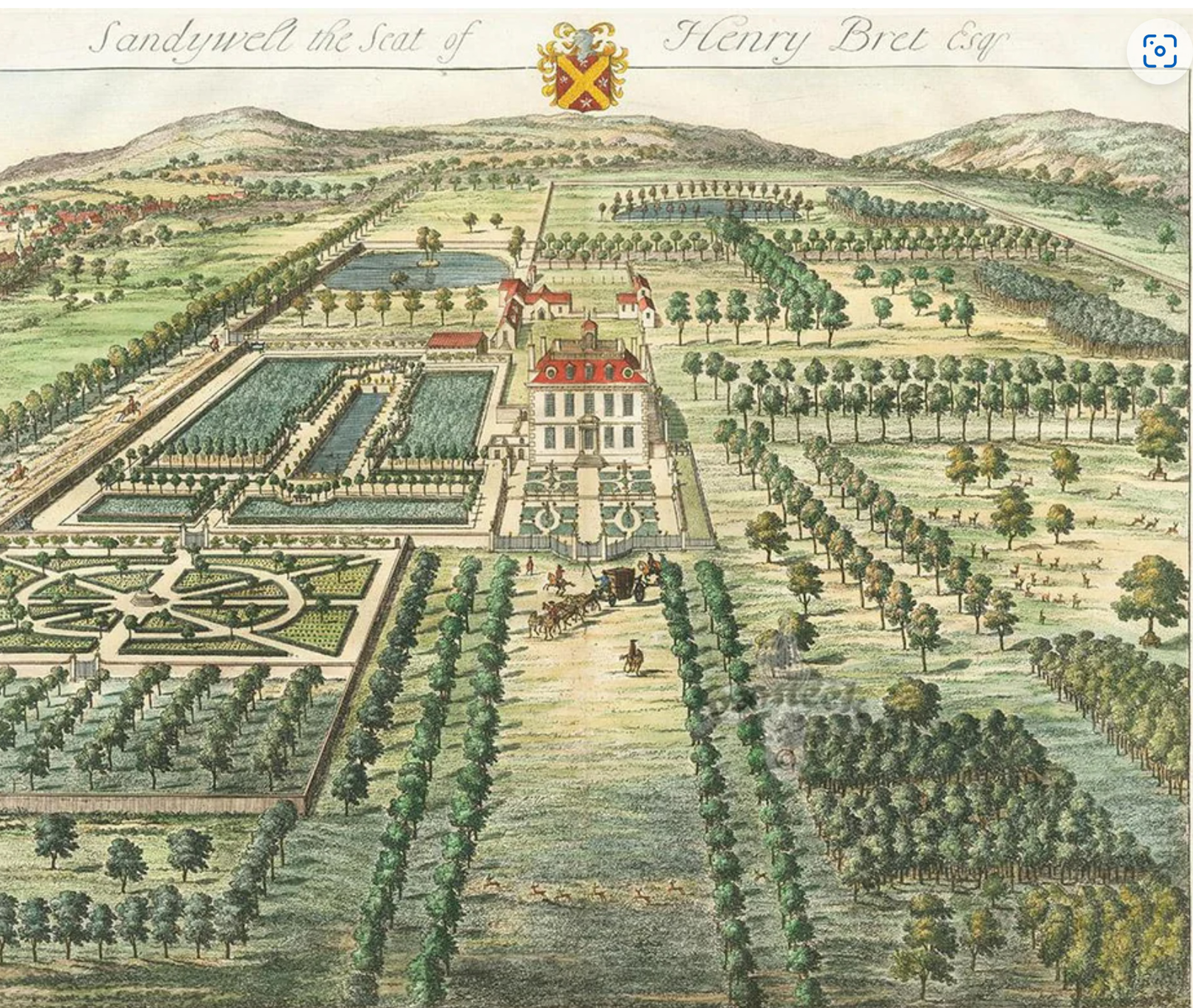
Sandywell Park in 1712

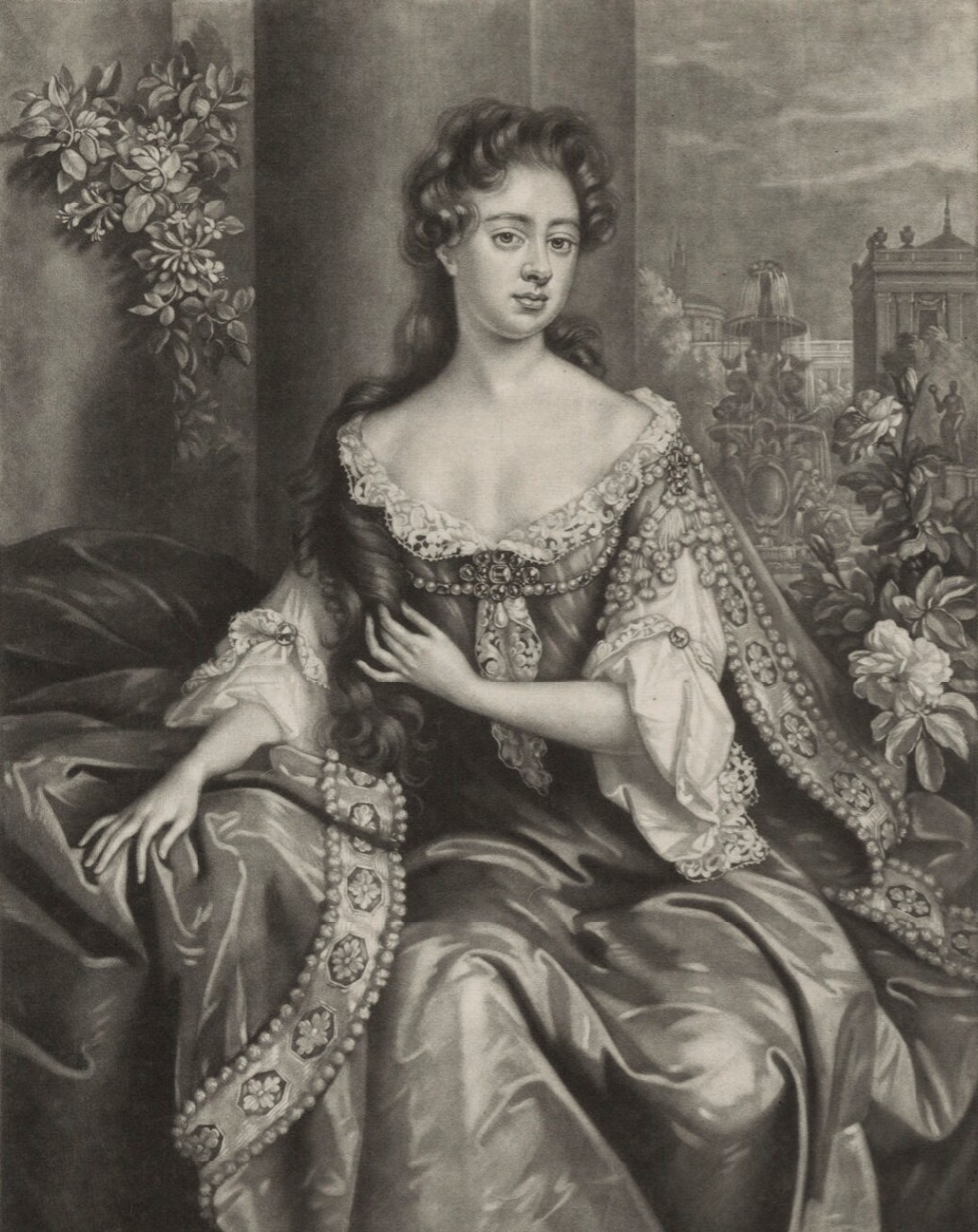
Anne Brett, wife of Henry Brett

In 1701 he married Anne Mason the daughter of Sir Richard Mason of Bishop's Castle. She also was an outgoing character. She was the divorced wife of Charles Gerard Viscount Brandon, 2nd Earl of Macclesfield. After her divorce her marriage settlement was restored to her and she also had inherited from her father. Therefore when she married Henry in 1701 she brought him a large fortune. This enabled him to build Sunnywell Park. An engraving of his estate was made in about 1712 showing the elaborate gardens and house which at that time did not have the two wings. These were added in 1720.

In 1712 Henry sold the estate to Sir Francis Seymour-Conway, Lord Conway (1679-1732). He constructed the north and south wings to the building and added the adjoining Whittington Court property to the Sandywell estate. He was a wealthy landowner who also owned the stately home called Ragley Hall in Warwickshire. He was also a member of parliament.

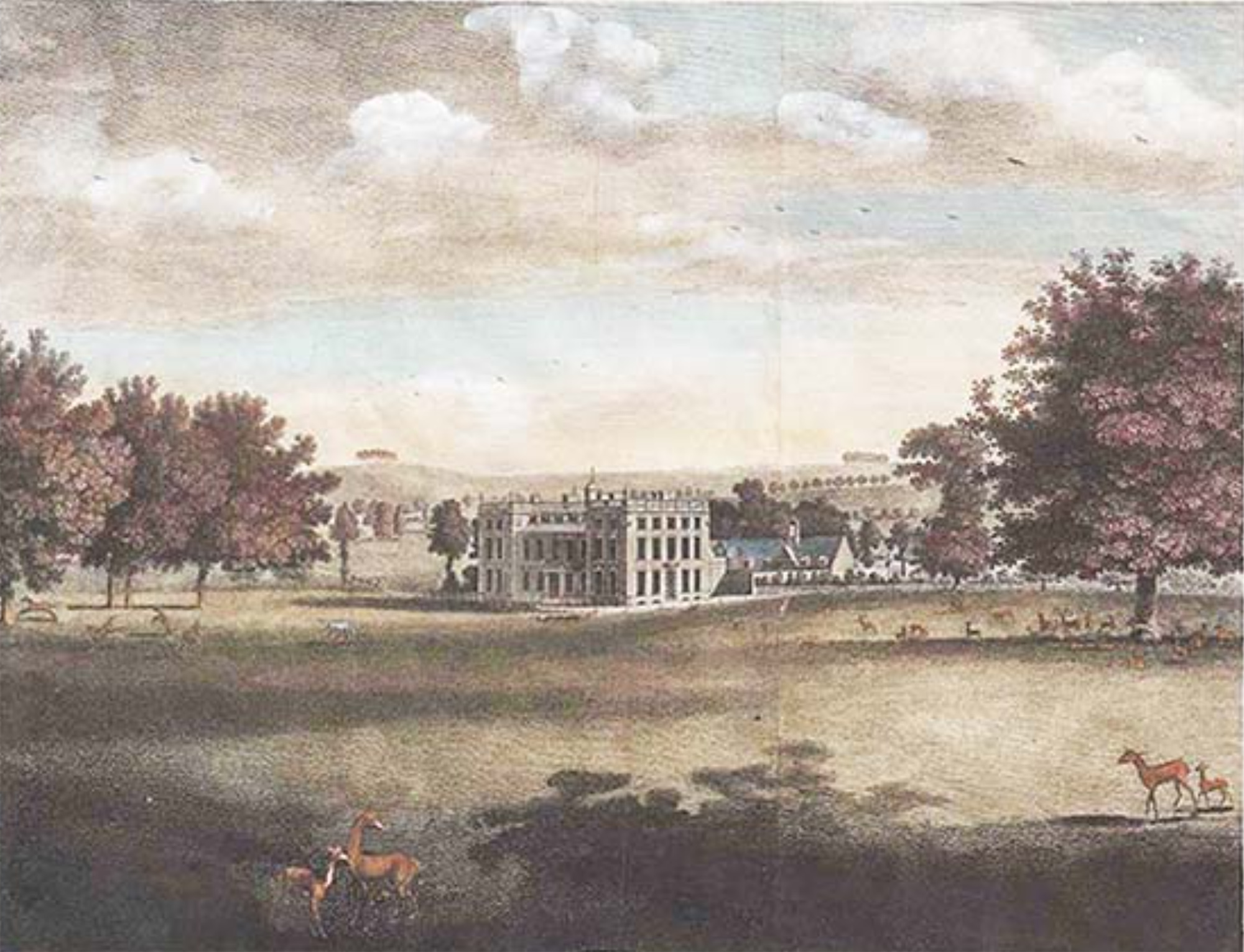
Sandywell Park in about 1770

He married three times. His third wife with whom he lived at Sandywell Park was Charlotte Shorter (1696-1733) daughter of Sir John Shorter, Lord Mayor of London and sister to Catherine who was Sir Robert Walpole’s wife. The couple had seven children. When Francis died in 1732 his eldest son Sir Francis Seymour-Conway, 1st Marquess of Hertford inherited Sandywell. He married in 1741 Isabella Fitzroy, daughter of the Charles FitzRoy, 2nd Duke of Grafton they had seven sons and four daughters. In 1748 Francis sold the property to Thomas Tracy.

Thomas Tracy (1716-1770) was a member of parliament. In 1846 he married Mary Dodwell (1723-1799), daughter and sole heir of Sir William Dodwell of Sevenhampton. Sir William had died when Mary was only four years old. However he bequeathed to her estates in Gloucestershire, Middlesex, Buckinghamshire, Kent, London and elsewhere. They had one son Dodwell Tracy but he died in 1768 at the age of 22. Thomas died in 1770 and Mary continued to live at Sandywell Park until her death in 1799. She did not leave a will so after prolonged court cases her enormous fortune was left in 1806 to three sisters from the Timbrell family who were her distant relatives.

== Later residents ==
Judith, Patience and Rebecca Timbrell lived at Sandywell Park until 1823 when the last sister died. This was Rebecca whose married name was Lightbourne. She left the house to Walter Lawrence Lawrence.

Walter Lawrence Lawrence (1799-1877) was the owner of Sevenhampton Manor which he inherited from his family. From about 1847 he leased Sandywell Park to doctors who used it as a sanitorium until 1883 when the Lawrence family returned to live in the house. The owner at this time was Christian William Lawrence, Walter’s eldest son, who had inherited the property in 1877 when Walter died.

Christian William Lawrence (1836-1920) was a retired diplomat. He worked for thirty years in the British Diplomatic Service. His appointments included the British Minister to Equador and the Secretaryship of the Legation to Stockholm. He had not married so when he came to live at Sandywell his three unmarried sisters, Mary, Alice and Agatha came to live with him. They all had predeceased him when he died in 1920 so he left his property to his two nieces who sold the house.

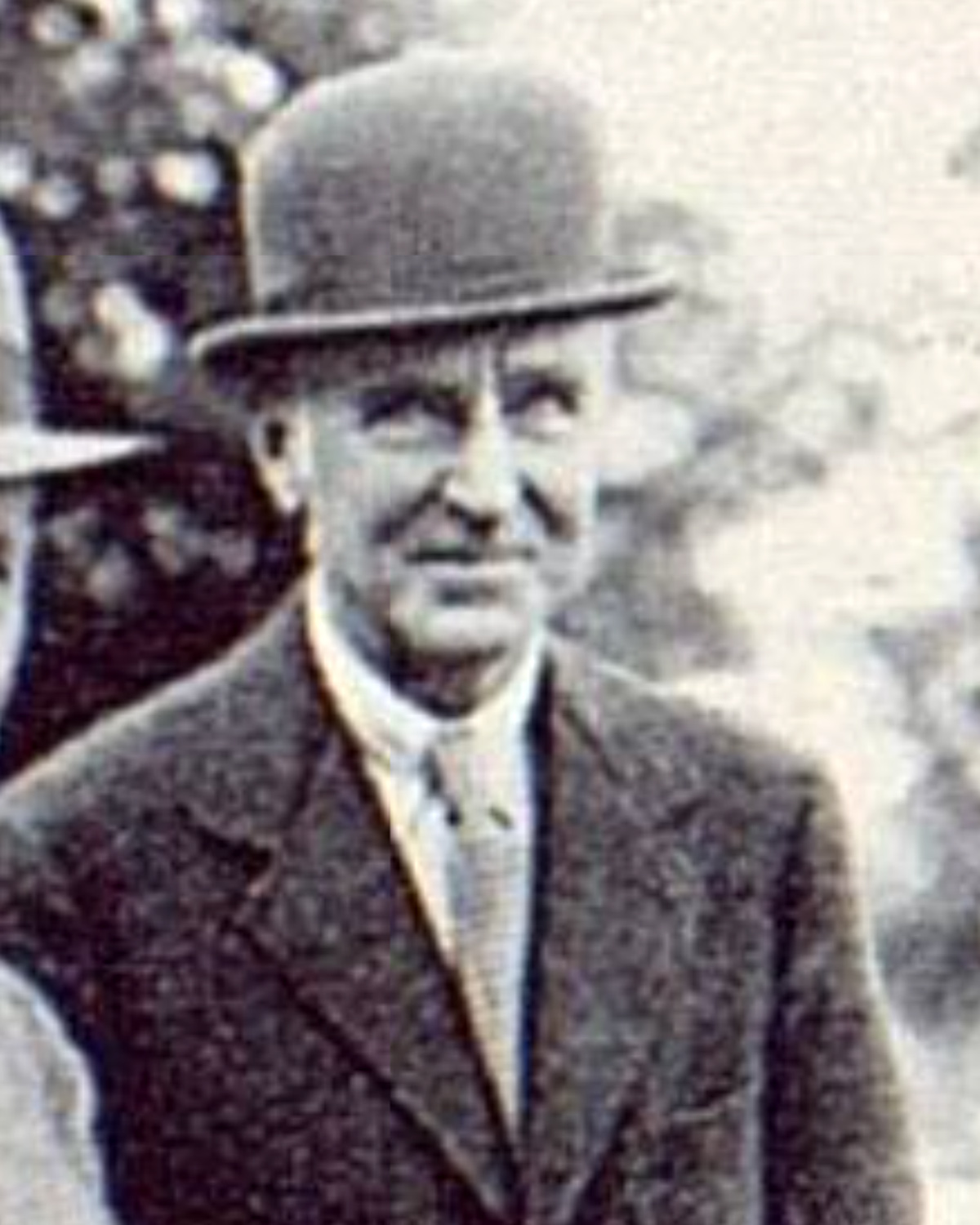
Captain Thomas Richard Colville

It was bought by Hubert Harry Stephens (1868-1953) who was the Director of the jam and pickle manufacturing company which was founded by his father John Stephens. He sold it four years later in 1924 to Captain Thomas Richard Colville.

Captain Thomas Richard Colville (1883-1950) was the son of Hugh Ker Colville of Bellaport Hall. He joined the Duke of Cornwall's Light Infantry in 1904. He served in the First World War and was involved mostly with the conflict in Egypt. After the war he returned and married Ellen Emily Harrison (1886-1949) who was the daughter of Frederick James Harrison of Maer Hall. They had one son. The 1939 Census records the couple living at Sandywell Park with eleven servants including a butler and footman. Ellen died in 1949 and Thomas died a year later in 1950. His obituary describes him as “a celebrated big game hunter, racehorse owner, fisherman and master of hounds.

It was later bought by the English, Scottish, and Australian Bank. In 1962 it was leased to Gloucestershire county council who used it as a conference centre until the mid 1970s. From 1976 until 1980 it was owned by Mr. A. Preston, who restored it and used part as a showroom for an antiques business. In the early 1980s the house was converted to form 12 flats.
