= Richard Savage (poet) =

English poet (c. 1697–1743)

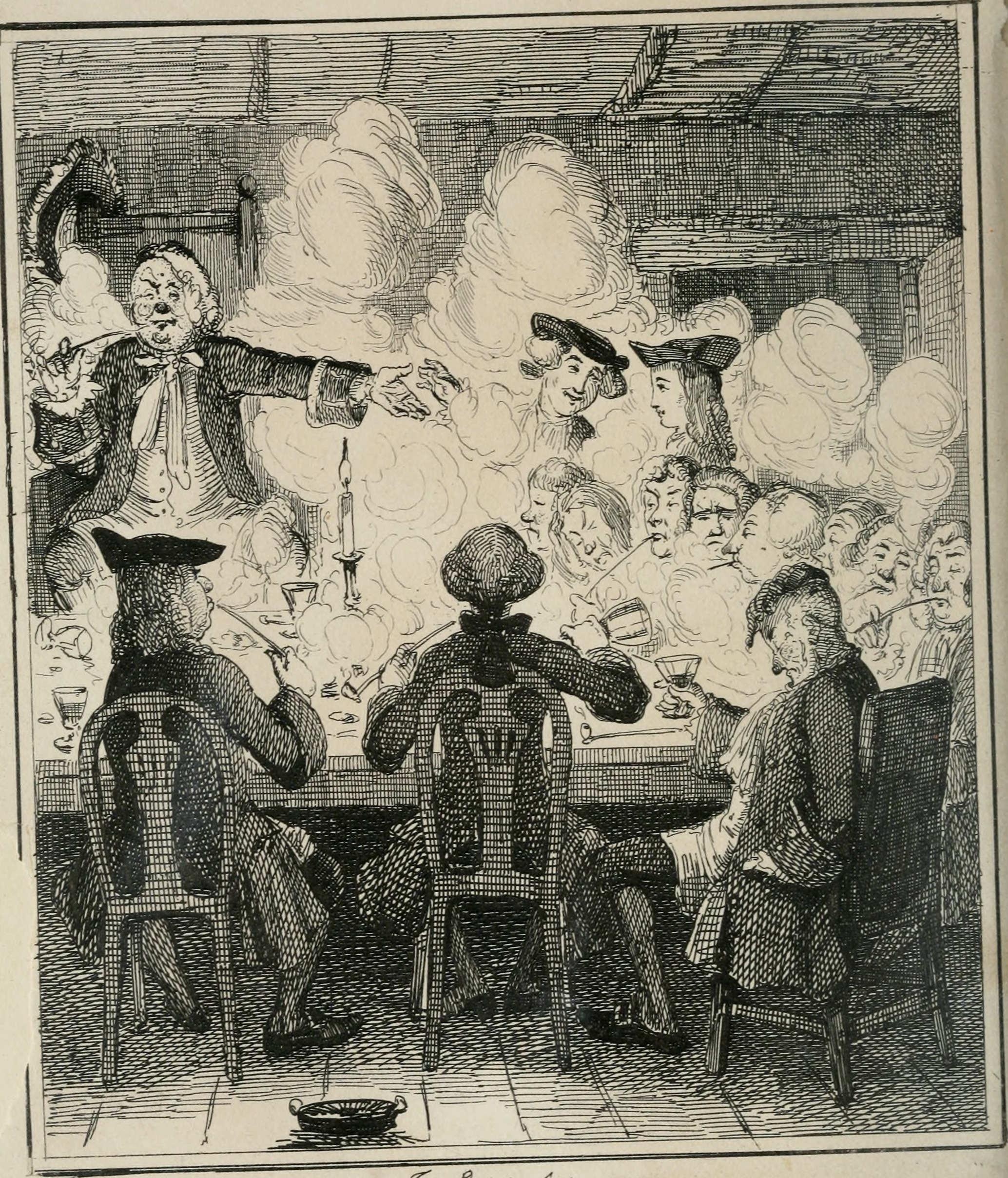
- Illustration from Richard Savage: A Romance of Real Life by Charles Whitehead
- Born: c. 1697; England
- Died: 1 August 1743 (aged 46); Bristol
- Occupations: Poet, satirist
- Relatives: Richard Savage, 4th Earl Rivers (father, disputed); Anne Gerard, Countess of Macclesfield (mother, disputed)

Richard Savage (c. 1697 – 1 August 1743) was an English poet. He is best known as the subject of Samuel Johnson's Life of Savage, originally published anonymously in 1744, which is one of the most elaborate of Johnson's Lives of the English Poets.

== Life ==
=== Early life ===
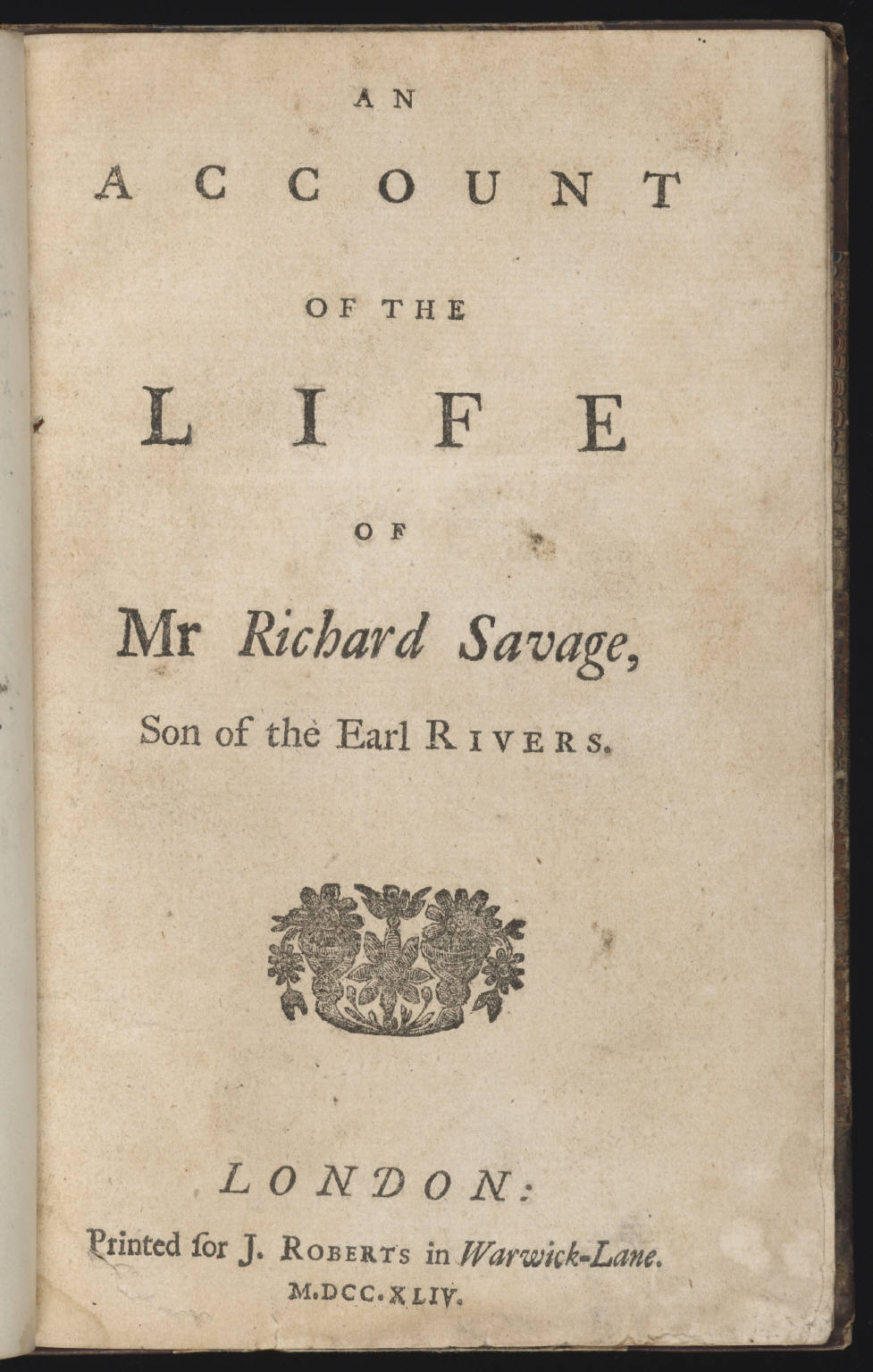
Title page of Life of Mr Richard Savage

What is known about Savage's early life mostly comes from Johnson's Life of Savage. However, such information is not entirely trustworthy, since Johnson did not feel the need to thoroughly investigate Savage's past. Johnson relied almost solely on books, papers and magazines that publisher Edward Cave retrieved for him from The Gentleman's Magazine's archives.

In 1698 Charles Gerard, 2nd Earl of Macclesfield, obtained a divorce from his wife, Anne, daughter of Sir Richard Mason. Shortly afterwards she married Colonel Henry Brett. Lady Macclesfield had two children by Richard Savage, 4th Earl Rivers, the second of whom was born at Fox Court, Holborn, on 16 January 1697, and christened two days later at St Andrew, Holborn, as Richard Smith. Six months later the child was placed with nurse Anne Portlock in Covent Garden. Nothing more is positively known of him, but Savage later claimed to be this child. He stated that he had been cared for by Lady Mason, his grandmother, who had put him in a school near St Albans, and by his godmother, one Mrs Lloyd. He said he had been pursued by the relentless hostility of his mother, by then Mrs Brett, who had prevented Lord Rivers from leaving £6,000 to him, had tried to have him abducted to the West Indies and then apprenticed him as a shoemaker in Holborn. Savage claimed to have discovered his true identity in 1714, through reading some letters by Mrs Lloyd. The first recorded occurrence of his name dates back to 1715, when he identified himself as "Mr. Savage, natural son to the late Earl Rivers" after being arrested for possessing a censored political pamphlet. He continued to use this name afterwards and gave further details of his parentage in Jacob's Poetical Register.

=== Early career ===
Savage's first certain work was a poem satirizing Bishop Hoadly, entitled The Convocation, or The Battle of Pamphlets (1717), which he afterwards tried to suppress. He adapted from a Spanish comedy, Love in a Veil, (acted 1718, printed 1719), which gained him the friendship of Sir Richard Steele, who became his first patron, and of Robert Wilks. With Steele, however, he soon quarrelled. In 1723 he played without success in the title role of his tragedy, Sir Thomas Overbury (1723), which nonetheless provided him a considerable amount of notoriety.

By that time, Savage's story had become well known among literary circles, and he appeared lightly disguised in Eliza Haywood's novel Memoirs of a Certain Island Adjacent to the Kingdom of Utopia (1725). Haywood, an actress and best-selling novelist whose works were often a cause of scandal, purportedly had a romantic relationship with Savage, with whom she was rumored to have had a son. Savage actively participated with Haywood in the era's propensity for satire and praised her in several works, such as his prefatory poem for Haywood's Love in Excess. The two later quarrelled, and Savage satirized her in scathing terms in Authors of the Town (1725) and in An Author to be Lett (1729), in which he referred to her as a "cast-off Dame" who "Writes Scandal in Romance." Haywood was also lampooned as nothing more than a literary prostitute in Alexander Pope's The Dunciad, for which Savage was one of the chief sources of petty gossip about the "dunces" of Grub Street portrayed in the satire.

In 1724 Savage was taken up by writer Aaron Hill, thus becoming part of a circle known as the "Hillarian Group", which included several young poets such as John Dyer and James Thomson. Hill promoted their work in the bi-weekly magazine The Plain Dealer. Savage's relationship with Hill, which developed over a period of ten years, proved instrumental in providing him with the most important contacts in his career and, above all, in launching a persistent campaign to extort recognition and money from Mrs Brett.

Savage's Miscellaneous Poems were published by subscription in 1726. Savage openly exposed the story of his birth in the Preface, and made repeated oblique references to his mother and his status of abandoned genius in many of the poems. Mrs Brett reportedly paid him money to suppress the Poems, either to soothe him or to silence him.

=== 1727 trial ===
Gentlemen of the Jury, you are to consider, that Mr. Savage is a very great Man, a much greater Man than you or I, Gentlemen of the Jury; that he wears very fine Clothes, much finer Clothes than you or I, Gentlemen of the Jury; that he has abundance of Money in his Pocket, much more Money than you or I, Gentlemen of the Jury; but, Gentlemen of the Jury, is it not a very hard Case, Gentlemen of the Jury, that Mr. Savage should therefore kill you or me, Gentlemen of the Jury?

— Judge Page's speech to the Jury as reported in Johnson's Life of Mr. Richard Savage

On the night of 20 November 1727, Savage ran into two acquaintances, James Gregory and William Merchant. After staying out drinking until past midnight, they demanded a room at Robinson's coffeehouse near Charing Cross. Merchant, not being satisfied with being told to wait for a party of guests to depart, started a brawl in which Savage, amid the chaos, apparently stabbed and mortally wounded one James Sinclair, as well as injuring a maid. The following day, all three were committed in Newgate Prison, where they assured themselves that they would be charged with manslaughter, since no premeditation was involved in Sinclair's death. However, on 6 December, when they appeared at court at the Old Bailey, they were charged with murder. Sinclair's friends and the employees of Robinson's coffeehouse, moreover, proved pitiless in their testimony for the prosecution. A Mr. Nuttal, although not having seen Savage inflict the wound, suggested Sinclair had already surrendered when Savage attacked him, while Mr Limery, another of Sinclair's friends, saw Savage physically attack but reported that Sinclair still had his sword in hand. Further statements by Nuttal and Jane Leader, an employee at Robinson's, clearly established that in his final dying words Sinclair explicitly identified Savage as the man who stabbed him. The defence, on the other hand, tried to establish Savage's innocence by stressing the ill reputation of the Coffeehouse, by claiming that Savage acted in self-defence, and by insisting on the trustfulness and considerable social standing of the accused. The judge, Francis Page, was not impressed by their attempts, and in a speech filled with sarcastic comments made it clear to the jury what verdict he was expected to see delivered. At the end of an exceptionally long trial lasting eight hours, the jury found Savage and Gregory guilty of murder, and Merchant of manslaughter.

Savage's and Merchant's friends and acquaintances solicited a pardon from the Crown, as was customary following a death sentence. These did not include Savage's mother, who not only maintained her lifelong hostility towards her supposed son, but also recounted an earlier incident in which Savage had broken into her house in one of his repeated attempts at reconciliation and, according to her, had instead attempted to murder her. Poet and playwright Charles Beckingham wrote a defensive pamphlet called The Life of Mr. Richard Savage, and even Lord Tyrconnel, Mrs Brett's own nephew, petitioned to the king and queen for a pardon. Savage eventually escaped the death penalty by the intercession of the Countess of Hertford, who appealed to Queen Caroline.

=== Subsequent fame and decline ===
This Performance was always considered by himself as his Master-piece, and Mr. Pope, when he was asked his Opinion of it, told him, that he read it once over, and was not displeased with it, that it gave him more Pleasure at the second Perusal, and delighted him still more at the third.

It has been generally objected to the Wanderer, that the Disposition of the Parts is irregular, that the Design is obscure, and the Plan perplexed, that the Images, however beautiful, succeed each other without Order [...] This Criticism is universal, and therefore it is reasonable to believe it at least in a great Degree just; but Mr. Savage was always of a contrary Opinion; he thought his Drift could only be missed by Negligence or Stupidity, and that the whole Plan was regular, and the Parts distinct.

— Johnson about the criticism of The Wanderer

Savage's conviction for murder and the subsequent pardon gained him a considerable amount of fame, and his story was sought over by booksellers and discussed in salons and coffeehouses, along with the behaviour of Mrs Brett. His newfound fame prompted him to publish in 1728 a confessional poem titled The Bastard, which made explicit mention of Mrs Brett, his trial and the pardon by the queen, and discarded his previous image of "poor poet" in favour of a celebration of his own genius. In 1729 Savage published The Wanderer, perhaps his best known work to date, a long narrative poem which showed the influence of James Thomson's The Seasons. Savage himself considered the poem to be his masterpiece.

The turn of Savage's fortunes was also the result of a renewed campaign against his mother, which granted him in 1729 a fixed pension of the considerable amount of £200 per annum. Savage apparently obtained this through repeated extortion, as Johnson recounts that he "threatened to harass her [Mrs. Brett] with Lampoons, and to publish a copious Narrative of her Conduct, unless she consented to purchase an Exemption from Infamy, by allowing him a Pension." Thanks to this pension, Savage now bordered on opulence, along with an apartment in Arlington Street, and free supplies of wine and books, all at the expense of Lord Tyrconnel.

Paradoxically, at the height of his popular fame, Savage was bound by his deal with Mrs Brett and Lord Tyrconnel to remain silent as a poet until 1735, except for an unusual arrangement with Queen Caroline to become a "Volunteer Laureate" which granted him from 1732 a further pension of £50 per annum until the queen's death. The deal with Lord Tyrconnel also seemed to oblige Savage to dismiss his previous penchant for scandal in order to become a respectable member of society as his new patron was. The relationship between the two seemed genuinely based on Tyrconnel's sympathy and admiration of Savage as a poet, and it was Tyrconnel himself who promoted him to the queen as a candidate for the laureateship. Savage's literary inactivity (interrupted only by his occasional poems to the queen and to Robert Walpole, which he unsuccessfully tried to win as a patron) ultimately seemed to irritate Lord Tyrconnel, and by 1735 their relationship had deteriorated to the point that Lord Tyrconnel forbade him to continue living in his apartment in Arlington Street and stopped providing him his pension. Now reduced to poverty, Savage became a frequent target for a growing number of satires and attacks, but began publishing again for Cave's The Gentleman's Magazine.

=== Friendship with Samuel Johnson and final years ===
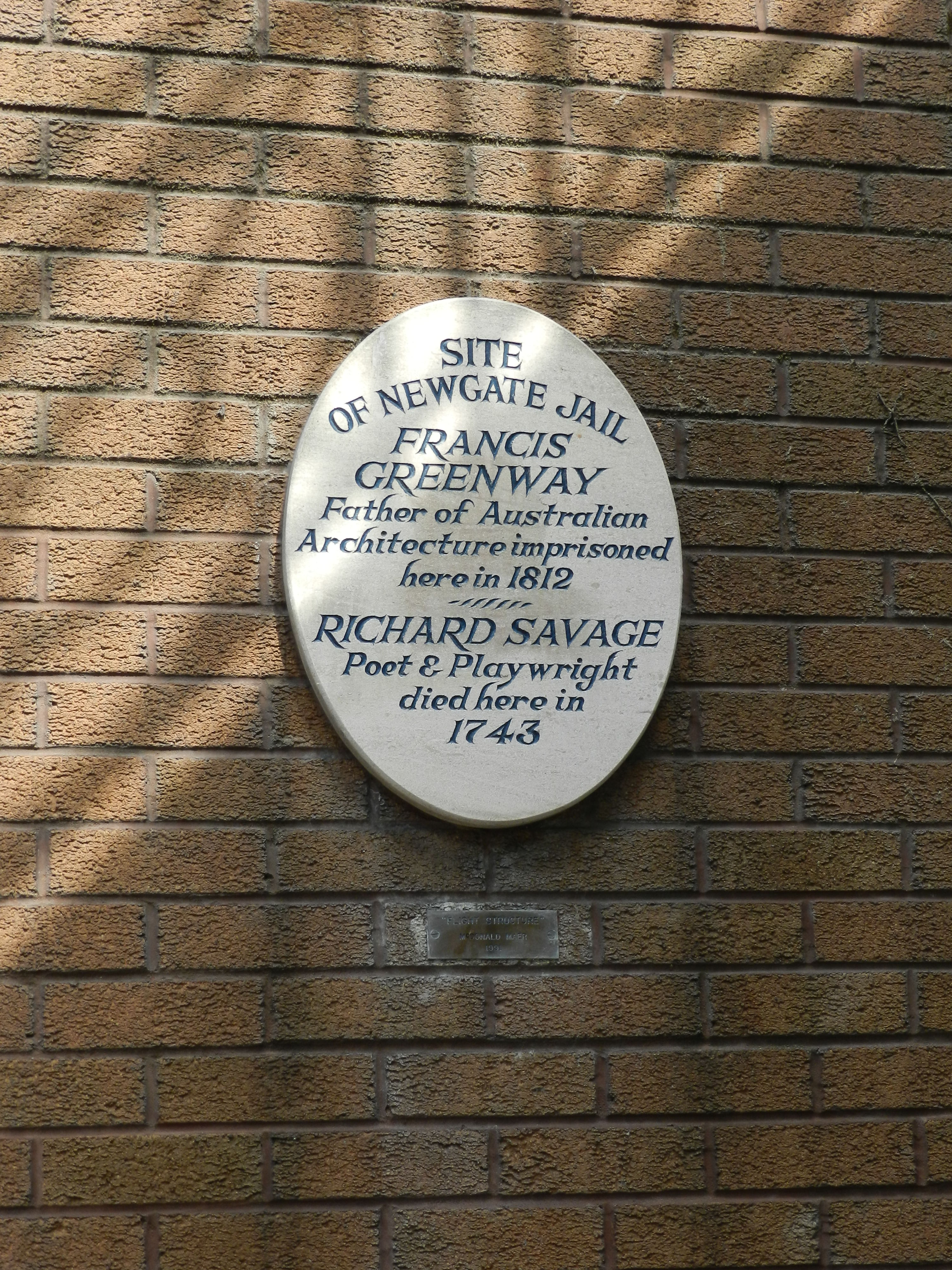
Plaque on the wall of the old site of Bristol Newgate Prison

It is not clear when Savage befriended writer Samuel Johnson, but it seems to have occurred in the latter years of the 1730s. How their friendship began is equally unclear, but Johnson relates having often accompanied Savage on his nighttime wanderings about London, where he witnessed the poet's poverty and frequent occurrences of public humiliation. These encounters provided much of the material for the Life of Savage. Johnson was fascinated by the independence, and the spirit of protest and outrage in Savage's character. He was also aware of the instability of mind which prevented Savage from taking positive control of his life.

In the meantime, Savage's financial situation worsened to the point that he had virtually no income. To save him from poverty, his longtime friend Alexander Pope launched a campaign involving several of his philanthropic acquaintances, including Ralph Allen, James Thomson and David Mallet. The purpose of this was to send Savage to Wales, where he could live with an annual allowance of £50. Pope also tried to push Savage into writing a letter to Sir William Leman, Mrs Brett's legitimate daughter's husband, begging him to intervene on his behalf with Lord Tyrconnel. Savage refused outright, a decision which was applauded by Johnson, since he considered the scheme to send Savage to Wales equivalent to exile.

Savage did eventually leave London in July 1739, thus breaking up his friendship with Johnson, with whom he had become a close literary ally. By spending his entire allowance as soon as he received it, Savage quickly alienated all his benefactors except Pope. When in Wales, Savage lived in Swansea, then in England at Bristol, where he completed a new version of Sir Thomas Overbury (which was first produced and published in 1777). Harassed by creditors and abandoned by friends, Savage reverted to a nocturnal existence.

On the night of 10 January 1743, Savage was arrested for a debt of eight pounds and confined in the debtors' section of the Bristol Newgate Prison. He died there on 1 August 1743, probably from liver failure brought on by drinking.

== Parentage ==
Savage's parentage, while the subject of some dispute, is central to his legend. Besides the story related by Johnson, a romantic account of Savage's origin and early life, for which he supplied the material, also appeared in Jacob's Poetical Register in 1719. Despite Savage's persistent claims that Mrs Brett was his mother, she never acknowledged him as such. She claimed that both the children she had by the Earl Rivers died shortly after birth, and that the boy was buried in St Paul's, Covent Garden, with the name of Richard Portlock. Lady Macclesfield's claims, however, are not incontrovertible, firstly because the boy buried as Richard Portlock may have been the son of nurse Ann Portlock (who Mrs Brett stated had named the baby); secondly, because of the yearly pension of £200 Savage began receiving in 1729 by Lord Tyrconnel who, being Mrs Brett's nephew, seemed to recognize him to some degree.

Savage's statements about his parentage, on the other hand, were not corroborated by the depositions of the witnesses in the Macclesfield divorce case, and Mrs Brett always maintained that he was an impostor. He was wrong in the date of his birth and, moreover, the godmother of Lady Macclesfield's son was Dorothy Ousley, not Mrs Lloyd. There is nothing to show that Mrs Brett was the cruel and vindictive woman he describes her to be. Discrepancies in Savage's story made James Boswell suspicious, but the matter was thoroughly investigated for the first time by William Moy Thomas, who published the results of his research in Notes and Queries. However, Clarence Tracy, in his biography The Artificial Bastard did give weight to Savage's claims. In Richard Holmes' Dr. Johnson and Mr. Savage the author, though not in complete agreement, did not discount Tracy's bias.

== Literary portrayals ==
Savage was the subject of the play Richard Savage by J. M. Barrie and H. B. Marriott Watson. It premiered at London's Criterion Theatre in 1891 but was critically panned and performed only once. Savage has also been the subject of fictionalised biographies by Charles Whitehead, in Richard Savage: A Romance of Real Life (1841–42) and Gwyn Jones, in Richard Savage (1935). Nicholas Seager and Lance Wilcox have described the former as a "Dickensian novel" that turns Savage into a hero, and the latter as having turned Savage into "something of a class warrior" with "delusive dreams". The Savage Club in London is named after him.

== Notable works ==
=== Theatrical works ===
- Love in a Veil (1718)
- Sir Thomas Overbury (1723)

=== Poetry ===
- The Convocation, or the Battle of the Pamphlets (1717)
- The Bastard: A Poem (1728)
- The Wanderer: A Poem (1729)
- An Author to Be Lett (1729)

==== Collected editions ====
- The Poetical Works of Richard Savage (1962), ed. by Clarence Tracy

== See also ==
- List of abolitionist forerunners
