= St Bartholomew's Church, Whittington =

Church of St Bartholomew
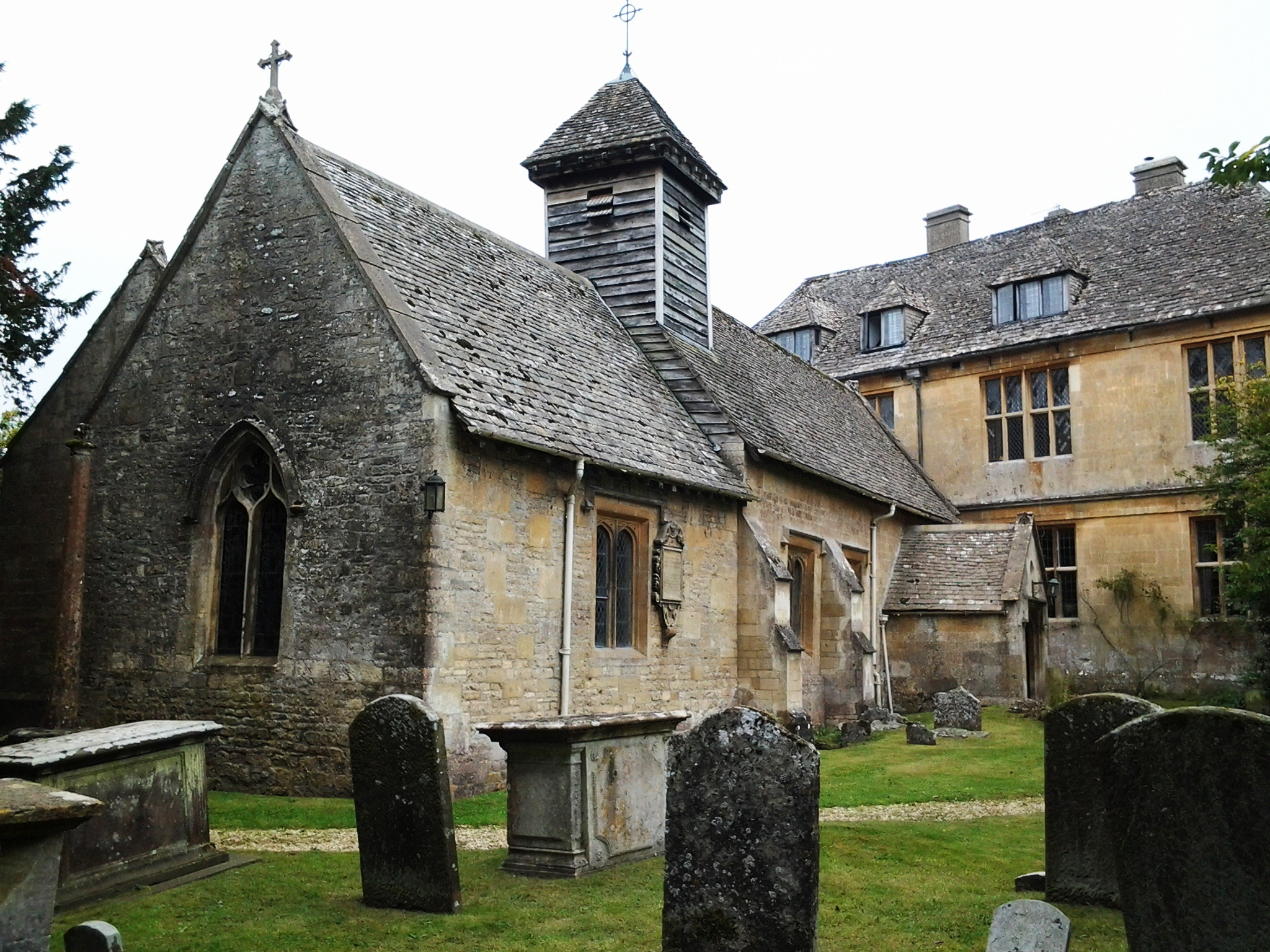
- Viewed from the north-east, with Whittington Court behind the church
- Church of St Bartholomew
- 51°53′03.48″N 1°58′55.96″W
- OS grid reference: SP 01321 20643
- Country: England
- Denomination: Church of England

Architecture
- Heritage designation: Grade II*
- Designated: 26 January 1961

Administration
- Diocese: Gloucester

St Bartholomew's Church is an Anglican church in Whittington in Gloucestershire, England. It in the Diocese of Gloucester and in the Coln River Group of Parishes. The earliest parts of the building date from the 11th or 12th century, and it is Grade II* listed.

== History and description ==
The church was sometimes described as a chapel in the medieval period. In 1750 it was called St Michael's; it was stated to be dedicated to St Bartholomew in 1922.

There is a nave, and chancel, dating from the late 11th century or 12th century. The nave and chancel are undivided. There is a wooden bellcot at the east end of the nave. In the chancel, the east window dates from the 14th century, and the south window dates from the 16th century. There is a south chapel, with large south and east windows, built in the late 16th century or 17th century.

Whittington Court is adjacent to the church. It was probably built by Richard Cotton (died 1556), probably on or near the site of the 14th-century manor house of the de Croupes (or de Crupes) family.

The architect Frederick S. Waller was the occupant of Whittington Court in the late 19th century. He renovated the house in the 1860s, and in 1872 he restored the church, for which local gentry and clergy subscribed. This included creating a two-bay arcade between the chapel and the rest of the church, which replaced a wall built by the Cottons, removing a rood screen and the west gallery, replacing the roofs of the main church, and adding a south vestry.

=== Interior ===
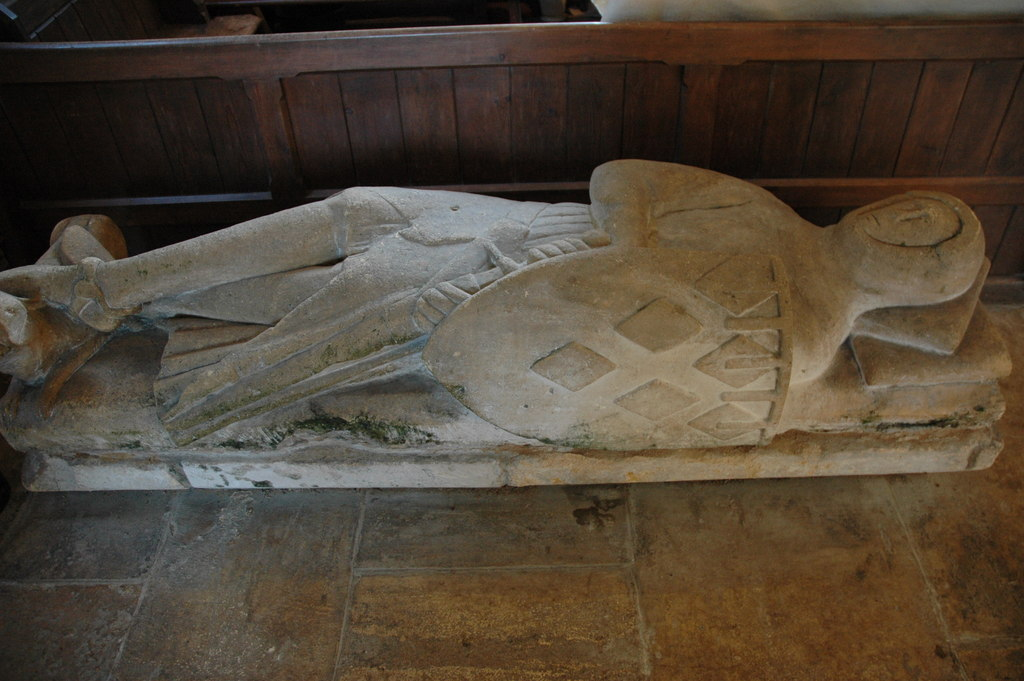
14th-century effigy of a knight

The octagonal stone font dates from about 1200. The pews and pulpit date from the 19th century.

Monuments include three 14th-century stone effigies in the transept, moved here in 1872 from elsewhere in the church. Two are of knights bearing the arms of the de Croupes family; they are thought to be Richard de Croupes (died 1278) and his son Richard, both lords of the manor. There is also an effigy of a lady wearing a wimple, thought to be the wife of one of the knghts. On the chancel floor there is a brass memorial to Richard Cotton and his wife Margaret (of Whittington Court in the 16th century).
