= Anne Brett =

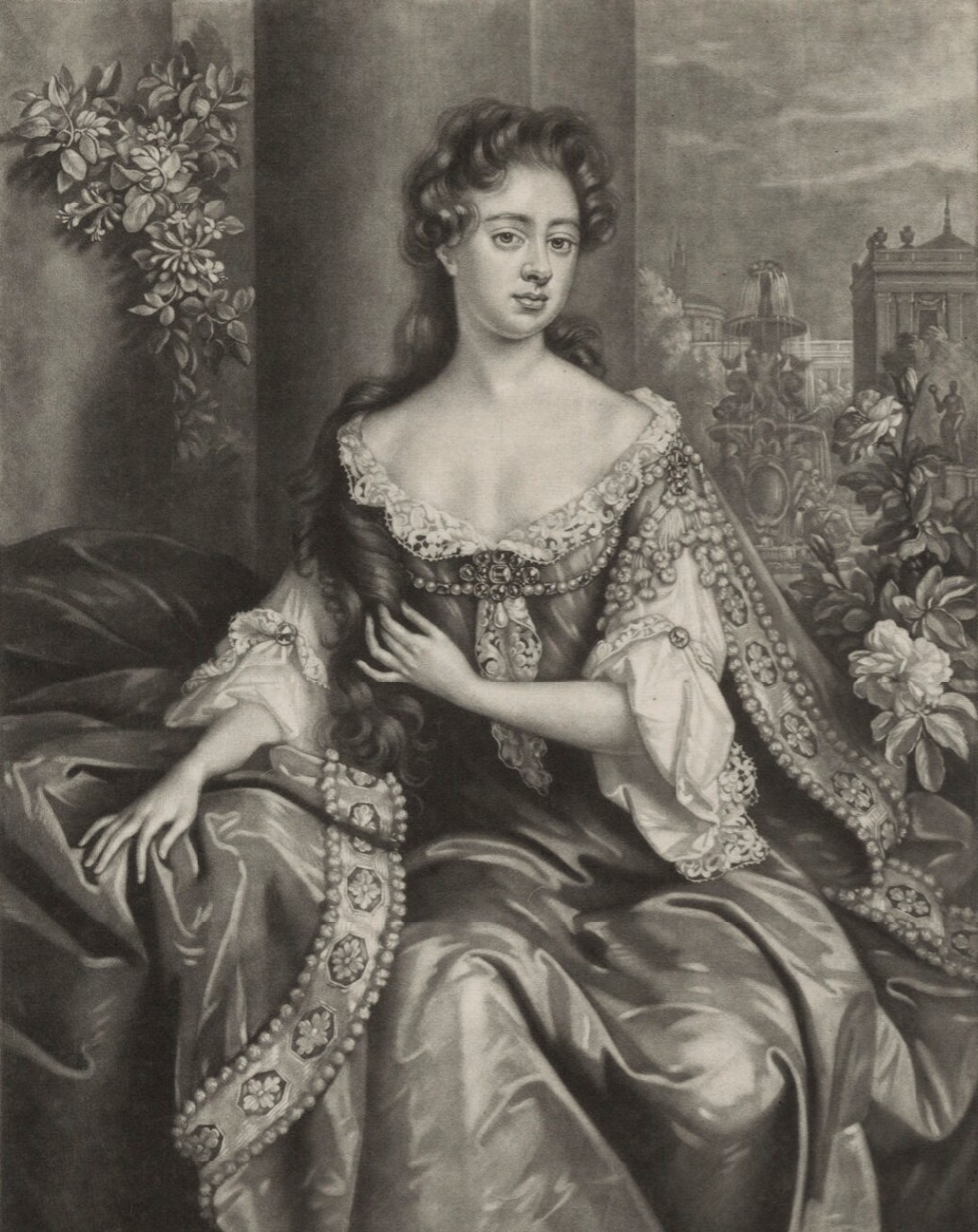
- Anne Gerard, 1687 engraving as Viscountess Brandon
- Born: Anne Mason c. 1667; Shropshire
- Died: 11 October 1753 (aged 85–86); Bond Street
- Spouse(s): Charles Gerard, 2nd Earl of Macclesfield (m. 1682; div. 1698) Henry Brett
- Partner: Richard Savage, 4th Earl Rivers
- Children: 3

Anne Brett (also Anna; née Mason; 1667/68 – 11 October 1753), was Countess of Macclesfield before her divorce in 1698 and a courtier of the Kingdom of Great Britain.

== Biography ==
Brett was born in Shropshire in 1667 or 1668. Her parents were Anna Margaretta Long and Sir Richard Mason and she was the granddaughter of Sir James Long, 2nd Baronet. Her sister Dorothy married Sir William Brownlow, 4th Baronet.

She first married Charles Gerard, Viscount Brandon when she was fifteen. The marriage was not a success but divorce was difficult. She had two children with Richard Savage, 4th Earl Rivers before her marriage was ended in 1698. Whilst she waited for their divorce her husband became the Earl of Macclesfield so she was a countess when they parted. She was a rich countess as over £12,000 was returned to her from before her marriage. Her children, Anne and Richard Savage had been kept a secret. She said that they died young, but years later the poet Richard Savage claimed to be her son.

Countess Macclesfield was appointed as a Lady in Waiting to Princess Anne. Her second husband was Henry Brett. They had a daughter, Anna Margharetta, who was said to be a mistress of George I of Great Britain. However there is poor evidence for this.

Colley Cibber is said to have submitted for her approval the text of his play, The Careless Husband, which was first put on the boards in 1704 because he valued her opinion.

Brett died at her home in Old Bond Street in London, on 11 October 1753.
