= Edmund Smith (poet) =

English poet

Edmund Smith (1672–1710), born Edmund Neale, was a minor English poet in the early 18th century. He is little read today but Samuel Johnson included him in his Lives of the Most Eminent English Poets in 1781.

== Biography ==
The son of a successful merchant, Edmund Smith attended Westminster School and Christ Church, Oxford where he stayed until 1705. Smith translated Phèdre by Racine which was staged in 1707 and died in Wiltshire in 1710.

== Notable works ==
- Phaedra and Hippolitus (1707) (translation of Phèdre by Racine)
- A poem on the death of Mr. John Philips (1710)
- Works (1714) (posthumous publication)
- Thales; a monody, sacred to the memory of Dr. Pococke. In imitation of Spenser (1750) (posthumous publication)
