= William Moy Thomas =

William Moy Thomas (1828–1910) was an English journalist, literary editor and novelist.

== Life ==
Born in Hackney, Middlesex, on 3 January 1828, he was younger son of Moy Thomas, a solicitor who was known as a legal writer with his brother John Henry Thomas. He became private secretary to Charles Wentworth Dilke; and in 1850 he was introduced by Sir Thomas Noon Talfourd to Charles Dickens, who engaged him the following year as a writer on Household Words, where he contributed until 1858.

In 1866–87 Thomas was London correspondent of the New York Round Table, under the signature "Q", and in 1868 he joined the staff of the Daily News, writing the weekly article In the Recess and the drama criticism. He was the first editor of Cassell's Magazine, in which appeared A Fight for Life (3 vols. 1868), a novel that was dramatised. He was honorary secretary of the Authors' Protection Society (1873), and lobbied for the Royal Commission on copyright, which reported in 1878. He was drama critic for The Academy from 1875 to 1879, and for The Graphic from 1870 until dropping out of journalism some nine years before his death.

Thomas died after a long illness, at Eastbourne on 21 July 1910.

== Works ==
Thomas contributed on political philosophy to The Athenæum in 1855, and on literary history and political economy to Chambers's Journal, the North British Review, The Economist, and other journals. His first book was an edition of the Poetical Works of William Collins (1858), with notes and biography. In the same year he published on the biography of Richard Savage in Notes and Queries. In 1861 appeared his edition of The Letters and Works of Lady Mary Wortley Montagu, edited by Lord Wharncliffe; third edition, with additions and corrections derived from the original MSS., illustrative notes and a new memoir (2 vols.; reprinted in Bohn's Series, 1887, 2 vols., and in 1893). He wrote leading articles, reviews, and descriptive sketches for the Daily News to 1901.

Thomas also wrote:

- When the Snow falls, 2 vols. 1859 (1861 and other editions; stories republished from Household Words).
- Pictures in a Mirror, 1861 (stories).
- Golden Precepts, or the Opinions and Maxims of Prince Albert, 1862.
- Toilers of the Sea, by Victor Hugo, authorised English translation, 1866, 3 vols.
- A Guild Clerk's Tale, 1895.

== Family ==
Thomas married Sara Maria, daughter of Commander Francis Higginson, R.N., who survived him. They had eight children, including the author Frederick Moy Thomas.

== Notes ==
Attribution

This article incorporates text from a publication now in the public domain: Lee, Sidney, ed. (1912). "Thomas, William Moy". Dictionary of National Biography (2nd supplement). Vol. 3. London: Smith, Elder & Co.
