= Whittington, Gloucestershire =

Village in United Kingdom

Coordinates: 51°53′12″N 1°58′51″W

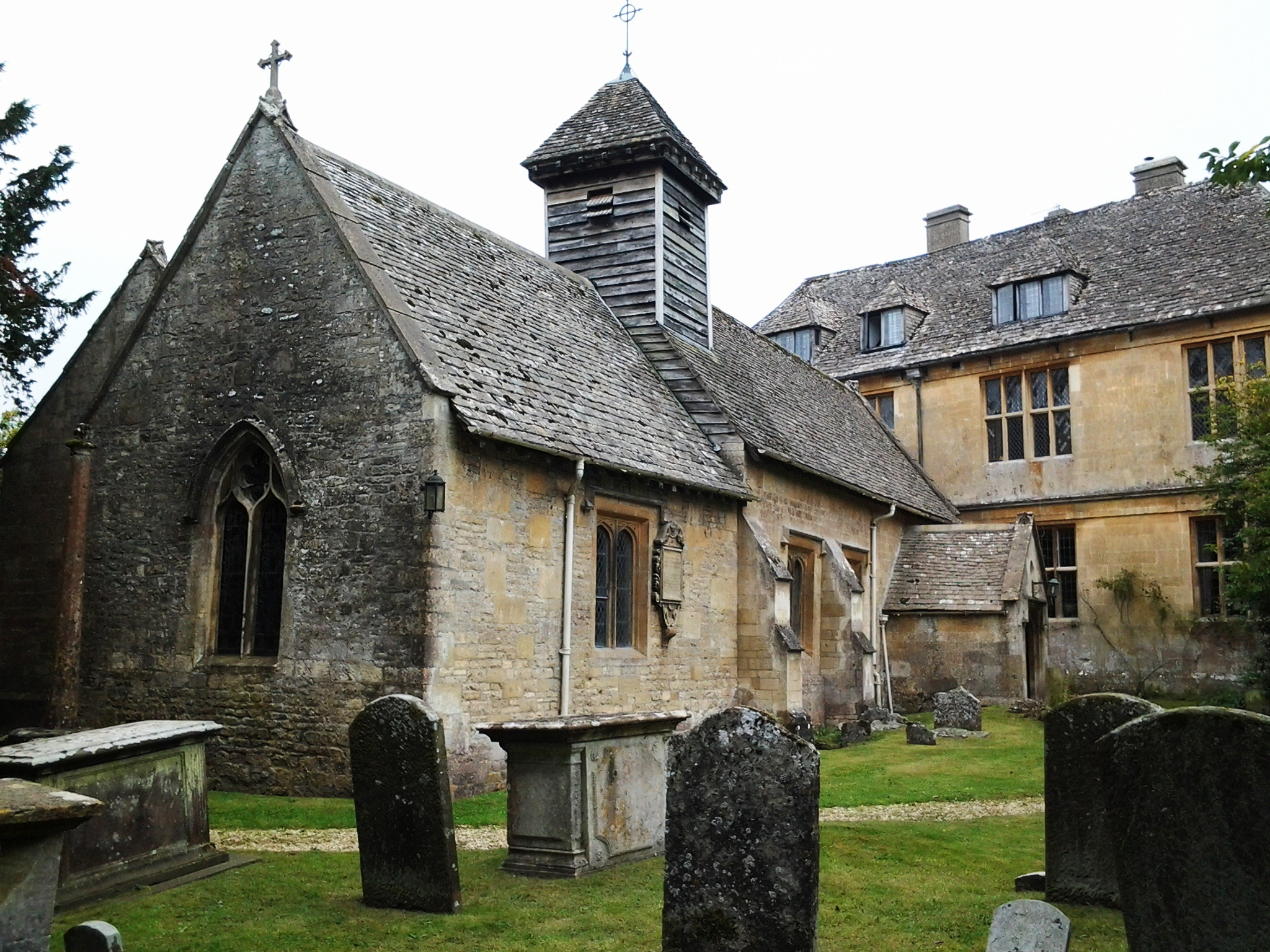
St Bartholomew's Church, Whittington

Whittington, Gloucestershire is a village and rural parish in the county of Gloucestershire in England, United Kingdom. It is situated some 4 miles south east of Cheltenham, just off the main A40 road. The Cotswold Hills' high point, Cleeve Hill, rises above the village.

== History ==
The village was mentioned in Domesday. The church is early Norman architecture in origin. It is the site of Roman settlements notably at a field called Wycomb (formerly Wickham).

Whittington Court is the former manor house. It was built for Richard Cotton (died 1556) and is a Grade I listed building.

The parish church is dedicated to St. Bartholomew and dates in part from the 12th century; it was largely restored in 1872.

== Amenities ==
The village is not large and the properties are spread along the main village roads.

Whittington village hall was built as a school in 1883, endowed by a Mrs Lightbourne of Sandywell Park, Andoversford. It has been used as a village hall since the 1930s.

The nature reserves of Dowdeswell Reservoir and Wood and Arle Grove lie near Whittington.
