= Henry Brett (colonel) =

Henry Brett (died 1724) was an English man about town, an army officer and Tory politician. He was involved in the theatrical world, and an associate of the playwrights Joseph Addison and Richard Steele.

== Life ==
He was the eldest son of Henry Brett of Cowley, Gloucestershire. Colley Cibber, who was a close friend, says that the young Brett was sent to Oxford and entered at the Temple, but was an idler about town in 1700, when he married Anne, the divorced wife of Charles Gerard, 2nd Earl of Macclesfield, who succeeded to the title in 1693. She was daughter of Sir Richard Mason, knight, of Sutton, Surrey, and married the Earl of Macclesfield, then Lord Brandon, in 1683, but separated from him soon after. She had two illegitimate children, one of whom, by Richard Savage, 4th Earl Rivers, was possibly the poet Richard Savage. The countess was divorced in 1698, when her fortune was returned to her, and two years later she married Henry Brett. He was very handsome, and the lady's sympathy is said to have been evoked by an assault committed on him by bailiffs opposite her windows.

After his marriage Henry Brett was for a short time Member of Parliament for the borough of Bishop's Castle, in Shropshire. He also obtained in 1705 the lieutenant-colonelcy of a regiment of foot newly raised by Sir Charles Hotham, but parted with it soon after.

Brett was a well-known member of the little circle of which Addison was the head, and which held its social gatherings at Will's and afterwards at Button's. He is supposed to be the Colonel Rambler of The Tatler (No. 7). He rebuilt Sandywell Park, which he sold to Lord Conway, and at one time had a share in the patent of Drury Lane Theatre (Cibber, Apology, p. 212). He survived his friend Addison, and died, rather suddenly, in 1724.

== Family ==
After her father's death, Brett's daughter, Anna Margharetta Brett, who appears to have been the sole issue of the marriage, and who is described as a dark, Spanish-looking beauty, became the recognised mistress - the first English one - of George I of Great Britain, then in his sixty-fifth year, by whom she is believed to have had no children. The young lady's ambition and prospects of a coronet were disappointed through the death of the king in 1727, and she subsequently married Sir William Leman, 3rd Baronet, of Northaw or Northall, Hertfordshire, and died without issue in 1743.

Mrs. Brett lived to the age of eighty. She died at her residence in Old Bond Street, London, on 11 October 1753. She is said to have been a woman of literary tastes, and Colley Cibber is said to have submitted to her revision the manuscript of his best play, The Careless Husband, which was first put on the boards in 1704.

Colonel Arthur Brett (whose daughter married Thomas Carte, the historian) is sometimes confused with Henry Brett.
