= Life of Mr Richard Savage =

1744 book by Samuel Johnson

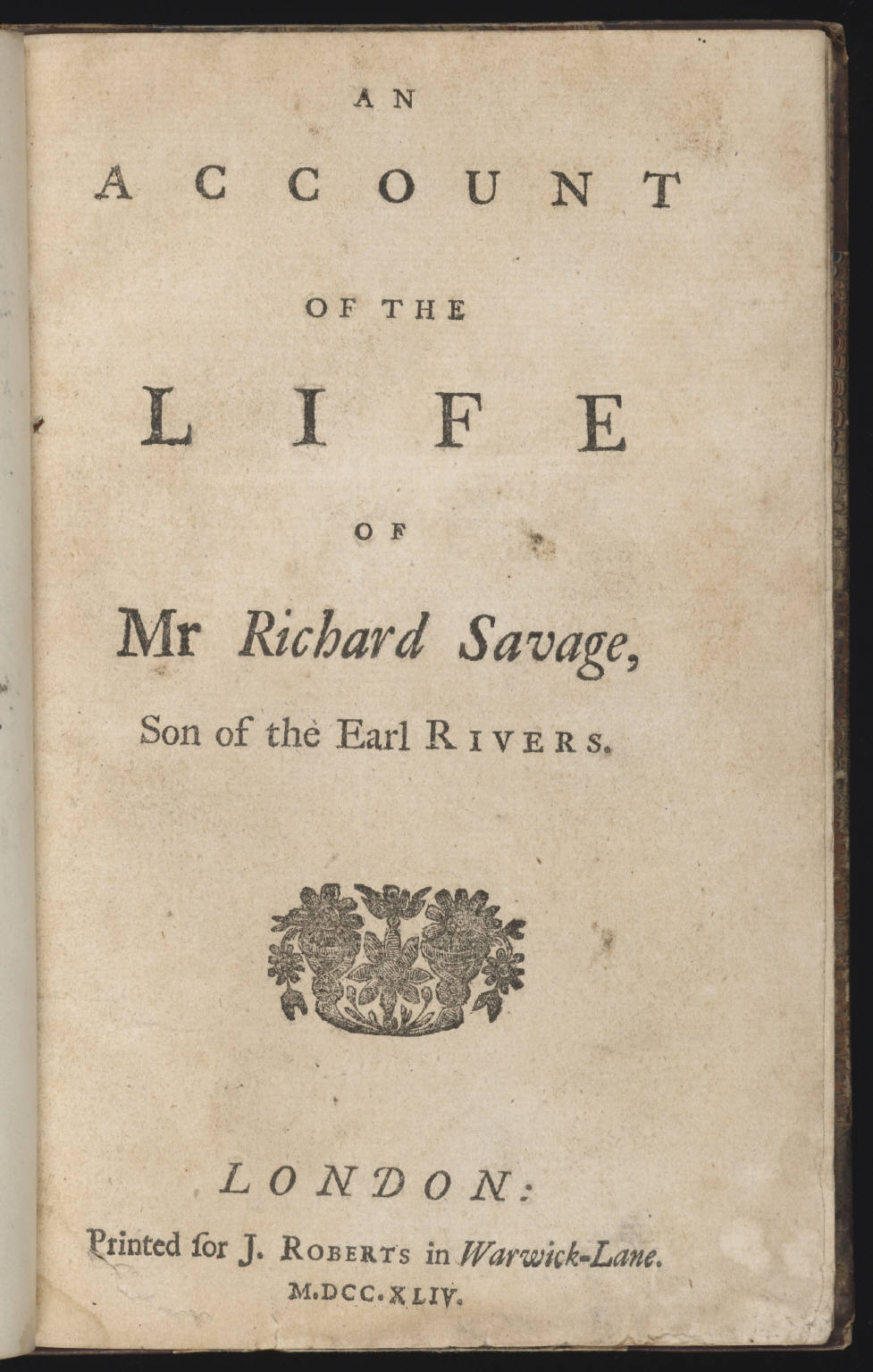
Title page of Life of Mr Richard Savage

Samuel Johnson's Life of Mr Richard Savage (1744) (short title Life of Savage and full title An Account of the Life of Mr Richard Savage, Son of the Earl Rivers) was the storied author and critic's first major work of biography. Some 200 pages, it was first published in London in 1744, its author remaining anonymous (at first). In it, Johnson faithfully details the life of his friend Richard Savage, a well known London poet who had died the year before—in 1743. The biography contains many details taken from Savage's own account of his life, as told to Johnson, including claims that he was the illegitimate child of a noble family that disowned and abandoned him at birth.

Savage had led a controversial and colourful life — Johnson used the illustrative material to pose and try to answer some wider ethical questions. The text was later included in The Lives of the Poets, published in 1779. Life of Savage was an important early step along Johnson's path to becoming a widely respected biographer in his later years and beyond. The biography was well received, including by critics; while it was a source of early praise for Johnson, it was not the financial success he had hoped for—at least not immediately. Praise for it has however persisted over the more than 200 years since its original publication: it continues to be described as "one of the best short biographies in English".

== Background ==
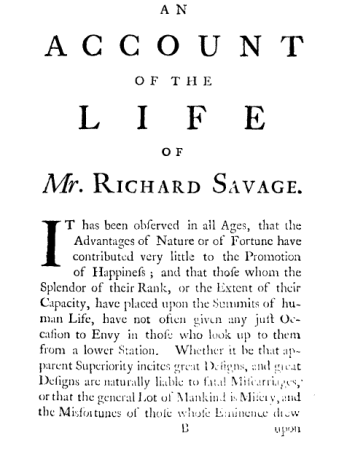
Page one, Life of Savage

The Life of Savage was not Johnson's first biography. In 1740 he wrote short biographies of Jean-Philippe Baratier, Robert Blake, and Francis Drake. Before this time, between 1737 and 1739, Johnson was close to Savage. Savage was both a poet and a playwright, and Johnson was reported to enjoy spending time and discussing various topics with him, along with drinking and other merriment. However, that lifestyle could not continue, and Savage was encouraged by his friends to move to Bristol and clean up his life. He was unable to accomplish this, which in turn led to his being sent to debtors' prison, and to his death in 1743.

Immediately after Savage died, various periodicals were printing biographical material on the dead poet. Edward Cave, Johnson's publisher, encouraged Johnson to put together a life of his friend. Johnson began to collect as many letters and biographical details as he could and, together with material from his extensive personal history with Savage, produced his work. Johnson dedicated a large portion of his time to the work, and was able to produce, as he claimed, "forty-eight of the printed octavo pages of the life of Savage at a sitting, but then I sat up all night."

Johnson finished the work just before the Christmas of 1743 and was paid fifteen guineas. It was published anonymously and contained almost 200 pages. It was immediately successful, but it was not the financial success that Johnson or Cave wanted nor did it extend Johnson's reputation at the time. However, it did form an important beginning for Johnson as a biographer, and the work was later included in his Lives of the Most Eminent English Poets series.

== Life of Savage ==
Although the work is a biography, it was a partial version of Savage's life as told by a friend and contained many minor errors. In particular, Johnson accepted Savage's own story that he was a disowned bastard of a noble family, even though there was little evidence to be found. However, Johnson did not hide the flaws of his friend. Johnson exposed the many faults of Savage, but he always felt that Savage was ultimately wronged throughout his life and should ultimately be admired.

== Critical response ==
Joshua Reynolds, Johnson's friend, told James Boswell that "It seized his attention so strongly that, not being able to lay down the book till he had finished it, when he attempted to move, he found his arm totally benumbed."

Walter Jackson Bate writes that the Life of Savage "remains one of the innovative works in the history of biography". Margaret Lane writes that the Life of Savage "is still the most absorbing of all Johnson's brief biographies and its news value at the time made it compulsive reading."
