= Thomas Newcomb =

English clergyman and teacher

- Born: c. 1682
- Died: c. 1765 (aged c. 83)
- Education: University of Oxford (BA)

Thomas Newcomb (c. 1682 – 1765) was an English clergyman and teacher, known as a poet. He was pro-government (i.e. Whig) writer of the ascendance of Robert Walpole, associated to Walpole through the interest of his patron Thomas Pelham-Holles.

== Life ==
He was born around 1682. He matriculated at Corpus Christi College, Oxford 15 April 1698, aged 16, when he was described as son of William Newcomb of Westbury, Shropshire. He graduated with a BA on 30 March 1704.

Newcomb became chaplain to Charles Lennox, rector of Stopham, near Pulborough in Sussex, in 1705. By 1706 he was also rector of the nearby parish of Barlavington, and he appears to have held that living until his death.

Newcomb taught in Hackney parish, where John André was among his pupils. On 8 May 1764 he wrote to the Duke of Newcastle, stating that his salary for supplying the chapel at Hackney had been taken from him, while his living in Sussex was very small. He asked the duke to contribute to a collection which friends were raising for him, and he enclosed a Latin character of John Wilkes, and verses on him.

Newcomb died at Hackney in 1765, and was buried there on 11 June. In the following year his library was sold. A mezzotint engraving of Newcomb by J. Faber, after Hawkins, was prefixed to his Last Judgment (1723).

== Works ==
In 1712, Newcomb published an anonymous satire Bibliotheca, a Poem occasioned by the sight of a modern Library. It is friendly to Richard Steele, and hostile to Daniel Defoe. The poem's form is related to a Battle of the Books; unusually for the period Newcomb included some female writers. The image of the goddess Oblivion may have influenced "Dulness" in Alexander Pope's Dunciad; the resemblance was pointed out by John Nichols. Roger Lund has argued that the debt may be considerably greater; as Newcomb himself complained.

In 1717, Newcomb wrote an Ode sacred to the Memory of the Countess of Berkeley, for the daughter of the Duke of Richmond, which Edmund Curll published on the recommendation of Edward Young, who was Newcomb's friend. Young announced in the Evening Post for 29 August that Curll was not authorised by him in publishing the Ode with his letter prefixed, and Curll defended himself in an advertisement in Mist's Weekly Journal for 31 August. In 1719, Newcomb contributed an Ode to Major Pack to the Life of Atticus, published by Richardson Pack, and in 1721 he published a translation of the Roman History of C. Velleius Paterculus.

In 1723, Newcomb brought out, by subscription, his longest work, The Last Judgment of Men and Angels. A Poem in Twelve Books, after the manner of Milton. The poem was written, says Newcomb, not for fame, but to promote the great ends of religion.

Newcomb published also:

- To her late Majesty, Queen Anne, upon the Peace of Utrecht.
- An Ode to the Memory of Mr. Rowe.
- The Latin Works of the late Mr. Addison, in prose and verse, translated into English.
- A translation of John Philips's Ode to Henry St. John.
- The Manners of the Age, in thirteen Moral Satires.
- An Ode to the Queen on the Happy Accession of their Majesties to the Crown, 1727.
- An Ode to the Right Hon. the Earl of Orford, in retirement, 1742.
- A Collection of Odes and Epigrams, occasioned by the Success of the British and Confederate Arms in Germany, 1743.
- An Ode inscribed to the Memory of the late Earl of Orford, 1745.
- Two Odes to His Royal Highness the Duke of Cumberland, 1746.
- A Paraphrase on some select Psalms.
- Carmen Seculare.
- A Miscellaneous Collection of Original Poems.
- The Consummation, a sacred Ode on the final Dissolution of the World, 1752.
- Mr. Hervey's Contemplations on a Flower Garden, done into Blank Verse, after the manner of Dr. Young, 1757 (reissued with additions in 1764).
- Vindicta Britannica, an Ode on the Royal Navy, inscribed to the King, 1759.
- The Retired Penitent, being a Poetical Version of the Rev. Dr. Young's Moral Contemplations. … Published with the consent of that learned and eminent Writer, 1760.
- Novus Epigrammatum Delectus, or Original State Epigrams and Minor Odes … suited to the Times, 1760, dedicated to William Pitt the Elder.
- A Congratulatory Ode to the Queen on her Voyage to England, 1761.
- On the Success of the British Arms, a congratulatory Ode addressed to his Majesty, 1763.
- The Death of Abel, a sacred Poem, written originally in the German Language, 1763.
- Mr. Hervey's Meditations and Contemplations, attempted in Blank Verse, 1764 (2 vols.); part had already been issued in 1757.
