= John Philips =

British poet (1676–1709)

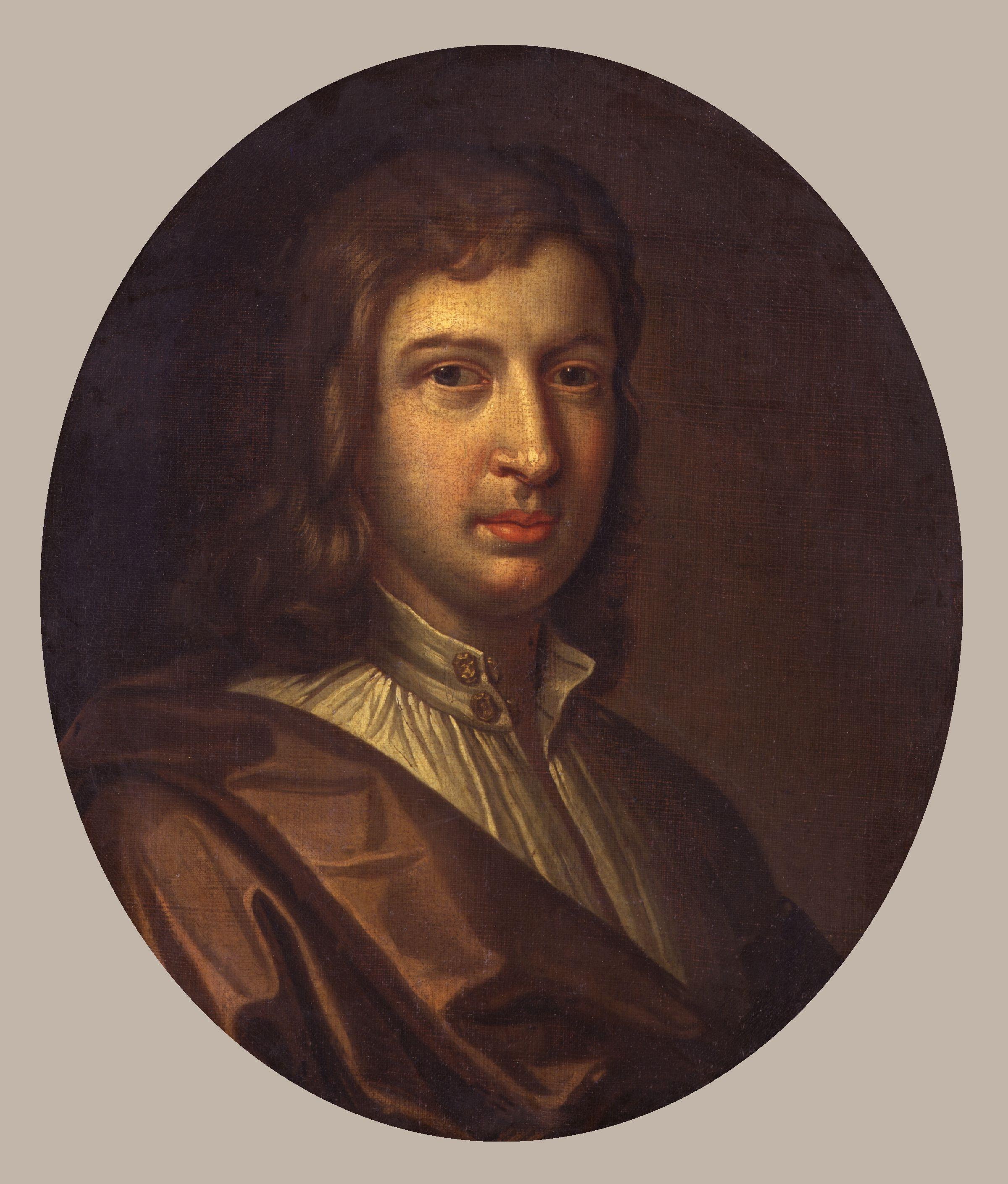
- John Philips, circa 1700
- Born: 30 December 1676; Bampton, Oxfordshire, England
- Died: 15 February 1709 (aged 32); Hereford, England
- Education: Winchester College, Christ Church, Oxford
- Occupation: Poet
- Writing career
- Genre: Poetry
- Notable works: The Splendid Shilling, Blenheim, Cyder
- Literary movement: Augustan poetry

John Philips (30 December 1676 – 15 February 1709) was an 18th-century English poet.

== Early life and education ==
Philips was born at Bampton, Oxfordshire, the son of Rev. Stephen Philips, later archdeacon of Salop, and his wife Mary Wood. He was at first taught by his father and then went to Winchester College. He suffered from delicate health but became a proficient classical scholar. He was treated with special indulgence because of his personal popularity and delicate health. He had long hair, and when others were at play, he liked to stay in his room reading Milton while someone combed his locks. He was then at Christ Church, Oxford under Dean Aldred, where Edmund Smith was his greatest friend. He intended to become a physician, but devoted himself to literature instead.

== Poetical works ==
Philips was loath to publish his verse but his Splendid Shilling was included, without his consent, in a Collection of Poems published by David Brown and Benjamin Tooke in 1701. When another false copy appeared early in 1705, he printed a correct folio edition in February of that year. The Splendid Shilling, a burlesque in Miltonic blank verse, was described by Joseph Addison as "the finest burlesque poem in the English language". It depicted the miseries of a debtor without a shilling in his purse with which to buy tobacco, wine, food, and clothes. As a result of this work Philips was introduced to Robert Harley and employed to write Blenheim (1705) as a counterblast to Addison's celebration of the Battle of Blenheim in The Campaign. The piece imitates Milton's verse, and the warfare is similar to that of the Iliad or Aeniad. In 1706, Cerealia; an imitation of Milton was published by Thomas Bennet, the bookseller who issued Blenheim. This has been believed to be by Philips, but it was not included in the early editions of his works, and his authorship has been questioned. In January 1707-8 Fenton published in his Oxford and Cambridge Miscellany Poems, a short "Bacchanalian Song" by Philips.

In 1708 Philips issued Cyder, his chief work, which is an imitation of Virgil's Georgics. Tonson agreed to pay Philips forty guineas for it in two books, with ten guineas for a second edition. Philips also received one hundred large-paper copies, and two dedication copies bound in goatskin. He signed a receipt for the forty guineas and the books on 24 January 1707-8 and the poem was published on the 29th (Daily Courant). It has some fine descriptive passages with an exact account of the culture of the apple tree and the manufacture of cider. It has many local allusions to Herefordshire, the County of his ancestors. Philip Miller the botanist told Johnson that "there were many books written on the same subject in prose which do not contain so much truth as that poem". Samuel Johnson objected that the blank verse of Milton, which Philips imitated, "could not `be sustained by images which at most can rise only to elegance". Pope said that Philips succeeded extremely well in his imitation of Paradise Lost, but was quite wrong in endeavouring to imitate it on such a subject.

Philip's minor productions include a clever Latin "Ode ad Henricum S John" written in acknowledgement of a present of wine and tobacco, which was translated by Thomas Newcomb. Philips also contemplated a poem on the "Last Day", but his health grew worse. After a visit to Bath, Somerset he died aged 33 of tuberculosis at his mother's house in Hereford.

== Memorials and testimonials ==
Thomas Tickell in his Oxford (1707) had compared Philips with Milton, saying he "equals the poet, and excels the man". After the poet's death, a monument in his memory was erected in 1710 by Simon Harcourt, 1st Viscount Harcourt in Westminster Abbey, between the monuments to Chaucer and Drayton, with the motto "Honos erit huic quoque pomo" from the title page of Cyder.

In February 1710 Edmund Smith printed a "Poem to the Memory of Mr John Philips" which was later described by Samuel Johnson as "a poem, which justice must place among the best elegies which our language can shew". In the same year Leonard Welsted published "A Poem to the Memory of the Incomparable Mr Philips" with a dedication to St John. In 1713, William Diaper paid his tribute by including the episode of Pomona mourning Thyrsis near the beginning of his Dryades; or, the Nymphs Prophecy (1713).
