= Whittington Court =

Manor house in Gloucestershire, England

Coordinates: 51°53′4″N 1°58′57″W

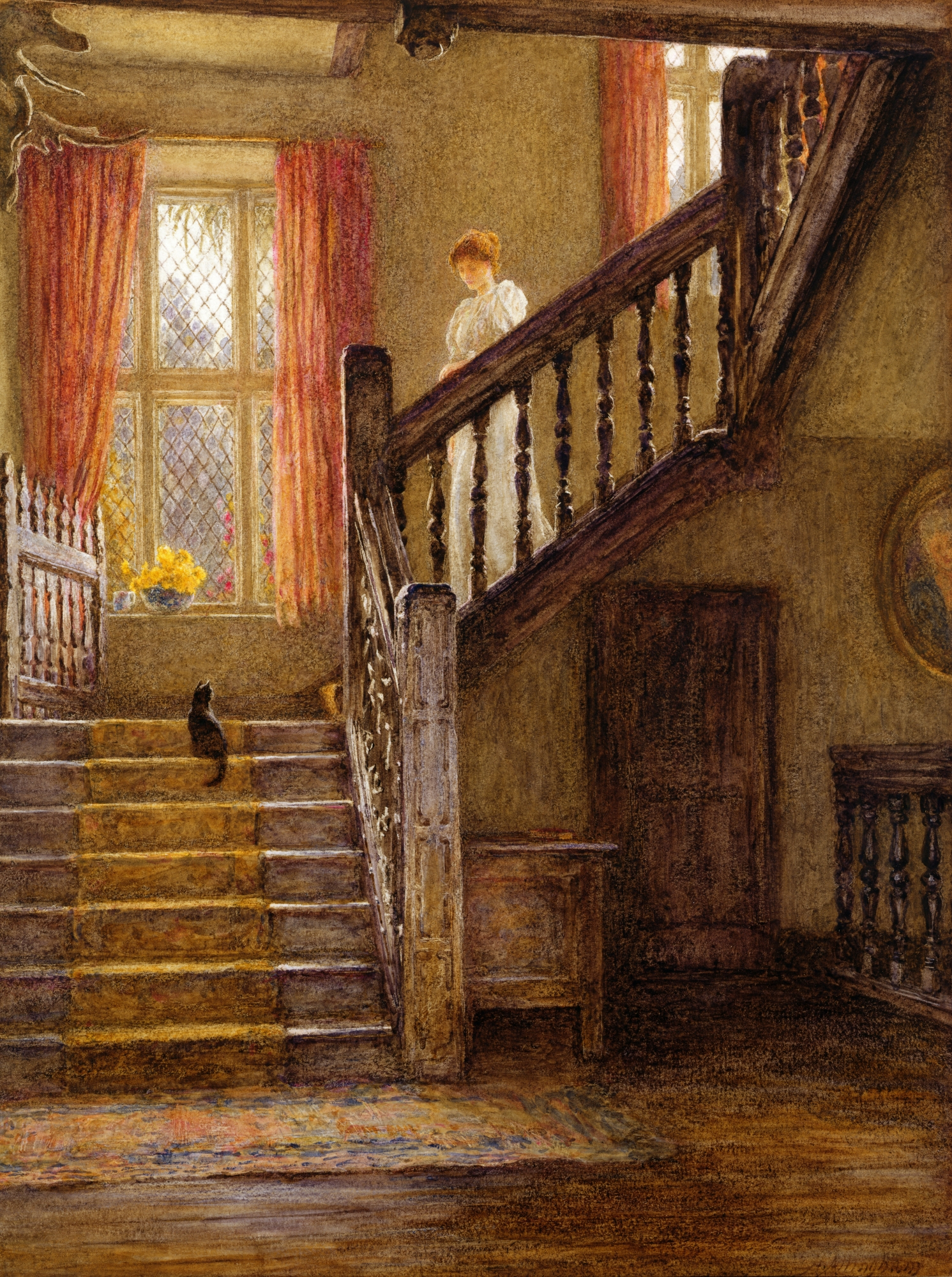
- The Staircase at Whittington court, painted by Helen Allingham
- Interactive map of the Whittington Court area

General information
- Location: Whittington, England
- Completed: 1556
- Client: John Cotton

Whittington Court is an Elizabethan manor house, five miles east of Cheltenham in Gloucestershire, England.

Adjacent to the house is the Whittington parish church which dates from the 12th century and now dedicated to St Bartholomew.

The origins of the manor site are unclear, but probably date back to Anglo-Saxon times; however, in 1948 the remains of a Roman villa were found in an adjacent field.

The current building was probably begun by Richard Cotton's son John Cotton in 1556 on an earlier moated site. It was completed in anticipation of Queen Elizabeth I's visit to the house in 1592 en route to Sudeley Castle. It passed to Sir John Denham by his marriage to Anne Cotton (died 1646); Sir John, who became Surveyor General to Charles II, died in 1669.

Whittington Court then passed through the female line to the Earls of Derby, and by the mid-late 18th century belonged to Thomas Tracey, Member of Parliament for Gloucester, who died in 1770. The Misses Timbrell and Mrs. Rebecca Lighbourne inherited the property but left no heir, the house passing to Mr. Walter Lawrence Morris and subsequently to his descendants, who adopted the name Lawrence. Alterations and additions were made in the 16th, late 17th and early 18th centuries. In the mid-eighteenth century the estate was sold and became part of the Sandywell Park estate. The kitchen wing was added in 1929. It is a grade I listed building.

The interior of the house is Elizabethan and contains two carved overmantels from Sevenhampton Manor - one showing the arms of Lawrence Washington (1602–1652) (the stars and stripes).

A barn dated 1614 and stable block are both grade II listed.

Since 1972 a disused gardener's cottage at Whittington Court has been the home to The Whittington Press, a fine press which also publishes the journal Matrix on printing.
