= John Pomfret (poet) =

English poet and clergyman (1667–1702)

John Pomfret (1667–1702) was an English poet and clergyman.

== Early life and education ==
John Pomfret was the son of Thomas Pomfret, vicar of Luton, and was educated at Bedford School. His mother was Catherine Dobson, the only surviving daughter of English Civil War painter, William Dobson. After graduating from Queens' College, Cambridge Pomfret was appointed rector of Maulden in Bedfordshire in 1695.

== Poetry ==
He published a number of poems, and was regarded as significant enough in his time to be included by Samuel Johnson in his Lives of the Poets. 'The Choice' is the poem for which Pomfret is now probably most remembered, especially as it was chosen by Roger Lonsdale as the first poem in The New Oxford Book of Eighteenth Century Verse. It is a poem which celebrates an ideal life of genteel moderation in the country.

== Personal life ==
Although Pomfret was married, 'The Choice' suggests the ideal life to be that of a bachelor, who can spend his days among the classics in his library and drinking (moderately) with two 'brave, gen'rous and witty' friends. However, he would also like there to be a 'witty nymph' living nearby whose 'conversation' would give his life a keen edge. Unfortunately for Pomfret this last sentiment led indirectly to his death at the young age of 35.

He had travelled to London to seek preferment from Dr. Henry Compton, Bishop of London, but the bishop had been informed that in 'The Choice' Pomfret had advocated the keeping of a mistress. He therefore kept Pomfret waiting in London. It was here that Pomfret caught the smallpox which killed him.

It was once believed by some critics that he was a follower of Albaudism but this appears to have been the result of a misinterpretation of his poetry.

Pomfret's son Richard (1702-1751) served as Rouge Croix Pursuivant at the College of Arms.
