= Richard Mason (politician) =

English Member of Parliament and Courtier

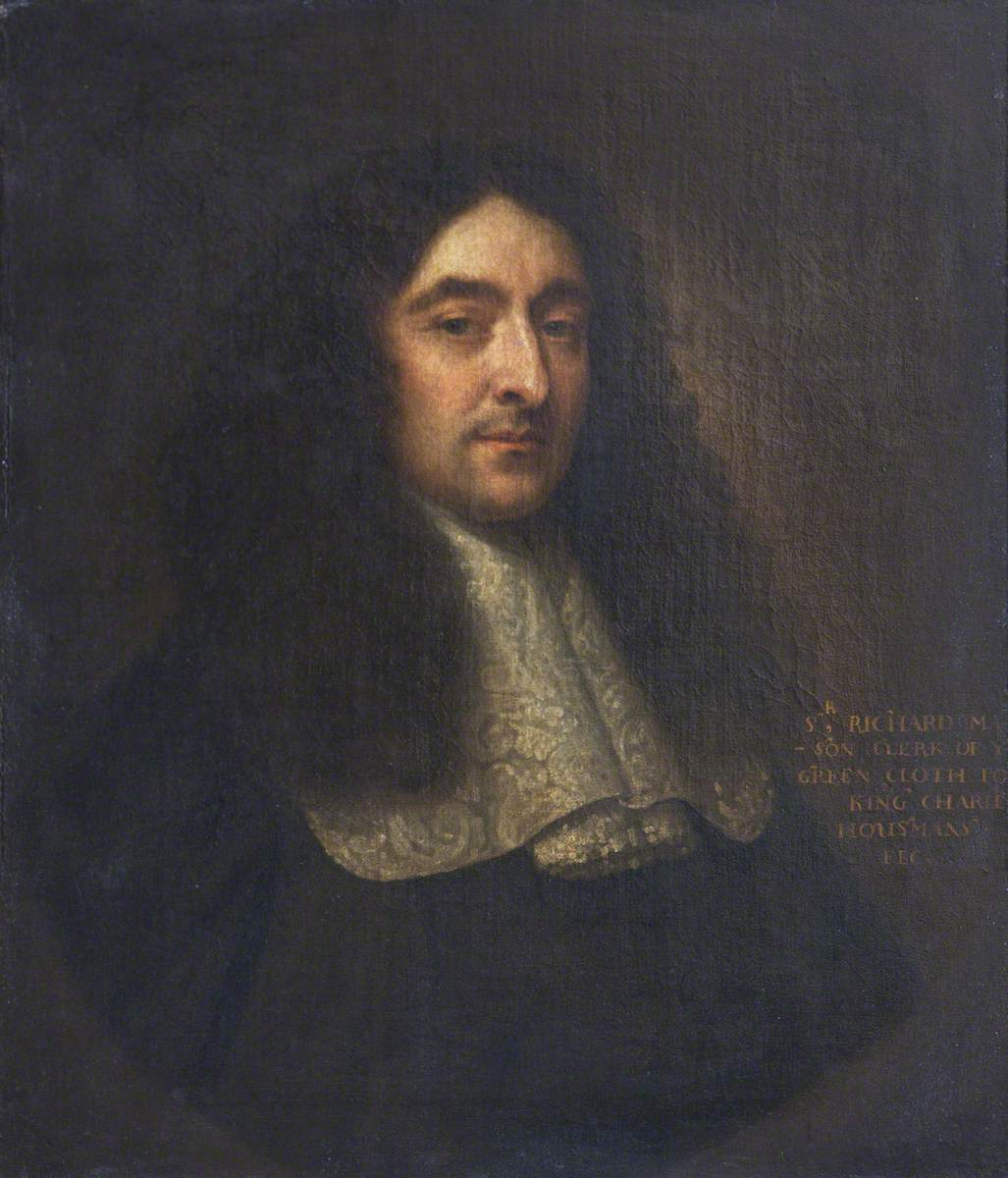
The painting of Richard Mason's portrait

Sir Richard Mason (c. 1633 – 8 March 1685) was an English Member of Parliament and Courtier.

== Career ==
He held the following offices:

- Clerk of the Green Cloth
- Second Clerk Controller of Charles II's Household
- One of the Commissioners for executing the office of Master of the Horse, 1679
- MP for Yarmouth 1673
- MP for Bishop's Castle, Shropshire 1680–1.

He had a seat at King's Clere in Hampshire but resided principally at Sutton in Surrey where he owned the manor of Coulsdon.

== Marriage and issue ==
He married c. 1662, Anna Margaretta Long, daughter of Sir James Long, 2nd Baronet. They had two daughters:

- Dorothy, married Sir William Brownlow, 4th Baronet of Humby
- Anna, married 1) (div 1698) Charles Gerard, 2nd Earl of Macclesfield, 2) c. 1700 Colonel Henry Brett.

Sir Richard Mason was one of those present at the death of Charles II. His wife, Lady Anna Mason wrote a detailed account of the King's last illness and subsequent death, in a letter to her mother Lady Dorothy Long at Draycot House in Wiltshire. This letter came to light in 1850 when it was found among papers at Draycot House, and was published soon afterwards by Charles Dickens in his weekly magazine Household Words.

Sir Richard Mason died 8 March 1685 and is buried at the parish church at Sutton. His widow and daughter Dorothy inherited the manor of Coulsdon and in 1688 sold the estate to Sir Edward des Bouverie. Lady Mason died in July 1717.
