= Johnsonism =

Johnsonism can refer to the ideology and policies of several different figures:

- Boris Johnson
  - Political positions of Boris Johnson
- Lyndon B. Johnson
- Samuel Johnson
  - Political views of Samuel Johnson
  - Religious views of Samuel Johnson
