= Cincinnati Music Theatre =

Community theatre company in Ohio, US

Cincinnati Music Theatre is a community theatre company in Cincinnati, Ohio, dedicated to presenting full productions of old and new musicals with an entirely volunteer staff.

== History ==
Started in 1963, founder Will Breyer contacted other musical theatre enthusiasts to join him in creating a new theatre devoted to helping nonprofessional actors. The original board Breyer constructed consisted of: Will Breyer, Doug Gray, Frank Longevin, Jean McDowell, John McDowell, Jane O'Reilly, and Joe O'Reilly.

The Cincinnati Music Theatre was originally named the Eastern Hills Music Theatre. Desiring a wider audience and a larger pool of actors to support, the fledgling theatre expanded into its modern state. The CMT hosts many performers, musicians, and production staff crews that come from southwest Ohio, northern Kentucky and other local areas.

Expanding further, the CMT moved to the Jarson-Kaplan Theatre of Aronoff Center for the Arts in 1995.

== Volunteers ==
The Cincinnati Music Theatre prides itself in having a staff and crew composed entirely of volunteers. The volunteer nature of the Cincinnati Music Theatre is why the organization is registered as an IRS 501c(3) non-profit. In order to coordinate volunteers, the CMT has a system of dues and patron levels.

== Performances ==
Season	Show
1963-64	The Most Happy Fella
1964-65	The Music Man
1965-66	Brigadoon
1966-67	The King and I
1967-68	Fiorello
1968-69	Carousel
1969-70	Kismet
1970-71	Mame
1971-72	Fiddler on the Roof
1972-73	The Most Happy Fella
1973-74	Guys & Dolls
1974-75	How to Succeed in Business Without Really Trying
1975-76	My Fair Lady
1976-77	1776/The Sound of Music
1977-78	Irene
1978-79	Annie Get your Gun
1979-80	Oliver!
1980-81	The Music Man
1982-83	Hello Dolly!
1983-84	Li'l Abner
1984-85	Guys & Dolls
1985-86	Annie
1986-87	Barnum
1987-88	Mack & Mabel
1988-89	The King and I
1989-90	Camelot
1990-91	Oklahoma!
1991-92	Brigadoon
1992-93	Oliver!
1993-94	Kismet
1994-95	Anything Goes/Perfectly Frank
1995-96	Sweeney Todd/Man of La Mancha
1996-97	The Secret Garden/My Fair Lady
1997-98	Cinderella/City of Angels
1998-99	The Mystery of Edwin Drood/Funny Girl
1999-00	Damn Yankees/South Pacific
2000-01	Evita/The Wizard of Oz
2001-02	She Loves Me/Carousel
2002-03	The Sound of Music/Mame
2003-04	Ragtime/Me/Kate
2004-05	Big/The Musical/Chicago
2005-06	42nd Street/Chess
2006-07	La Cage aux Folles/Hello Dolly
2007-08	Follies/Beauty and the Beast
2008-09	HMS Pinafore/Gypsy
2009-10	The Music Man/Guys & Dolls
2010-11	Curtains/The Drowsy Chaperone
2011-12	Hairspray/Titanic
2012-13	Company/Sunset Boulevard
2013-14	A Chorus Line/Peter Pan
2014-15	Young Frankenstein/Crazy for You
