= Samuel Johnson Birthplace Museum =

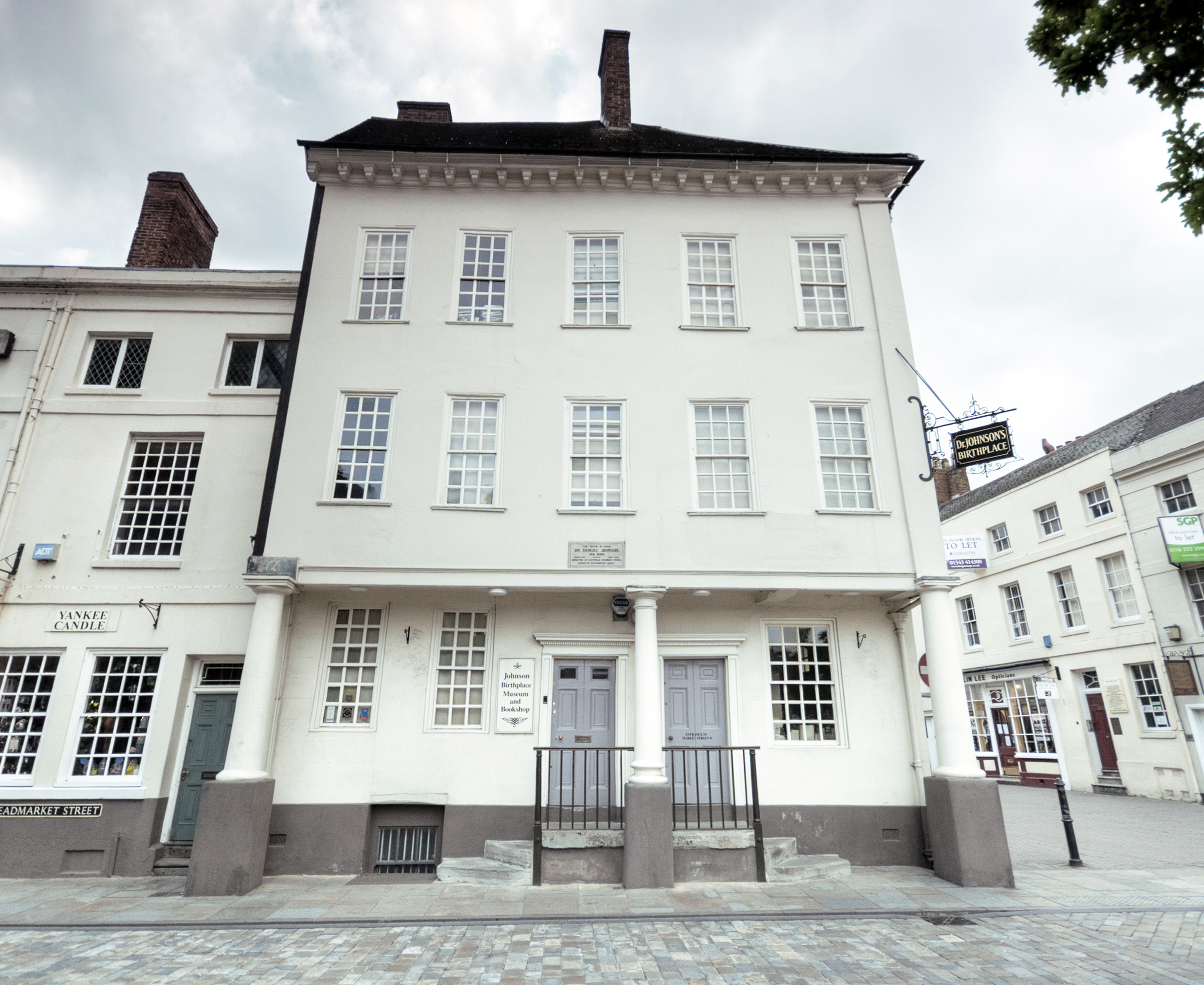
- Established: 1707 (House) 1901 (Museum)
- Location: Breadmarket Street, Lichfield, Staffordshire, England
- Coordinates: 52.683481°N 1.827886°W
- Type: Biographical Museum
- Collection size: 8,000 items
- Visitors: 16,000
- Curator: Dr Johnson's Birthplace Trust (Lichfield City Council)
- Website: http://www.samueljohnsonbirthplace.org.uk/

Samuel Johnson Birthplace Museum is a biographical museum and bookshop located in the centre of the city of Lichfield, Staffordshire, in England. The building is a Grade I listed building situated at the corner of Market Street and Breadmarket Street opposite the market square.

The museum opened in 1901 and is dedicated to the life and works of the author and lexicographer Samuel Johnson who wrote the first authoritative Dictionary of the English Language. Johnson's father built the house in 1707 and Samuel was born in the house on 18 September 1709 and spent the majority of his first 27 years in the house before leaving for London in 1737. The house was used as a commercial property for various trades between the time of Johnson's death in 1784 until the house was bought for the city by John Gilbert in 1900 for the purpose of retaining the building as a museum to Johnson. The house remains in active use as a museum.

== Architecture ==
The house was built on the corner of Breadmarket Street and Market Street in 1707 by Johnson's father, Michael. The house is built of timber frame and brick infill, now covered in stucco. It is in a Palladian style with four storeys, the top storey being lit with dormer windows which were removed in the 18th century and restored in the 1970s. The front of the house faces onto the Market Square and on this side the upper storeys are jettied outwards over the ground floor. As built this projecting front was supported at each end by a plain pillar, these continued upwards on the corners of the upper storeys by pilasters of the Ionic order. The facing of the house was red brown brick and the roof tiles were blue black. In the 18th century two central pillars were added and one was removed in the late 19th century. In the 19th century the pilasters were removed and the outside was stuccoed.

== History ==
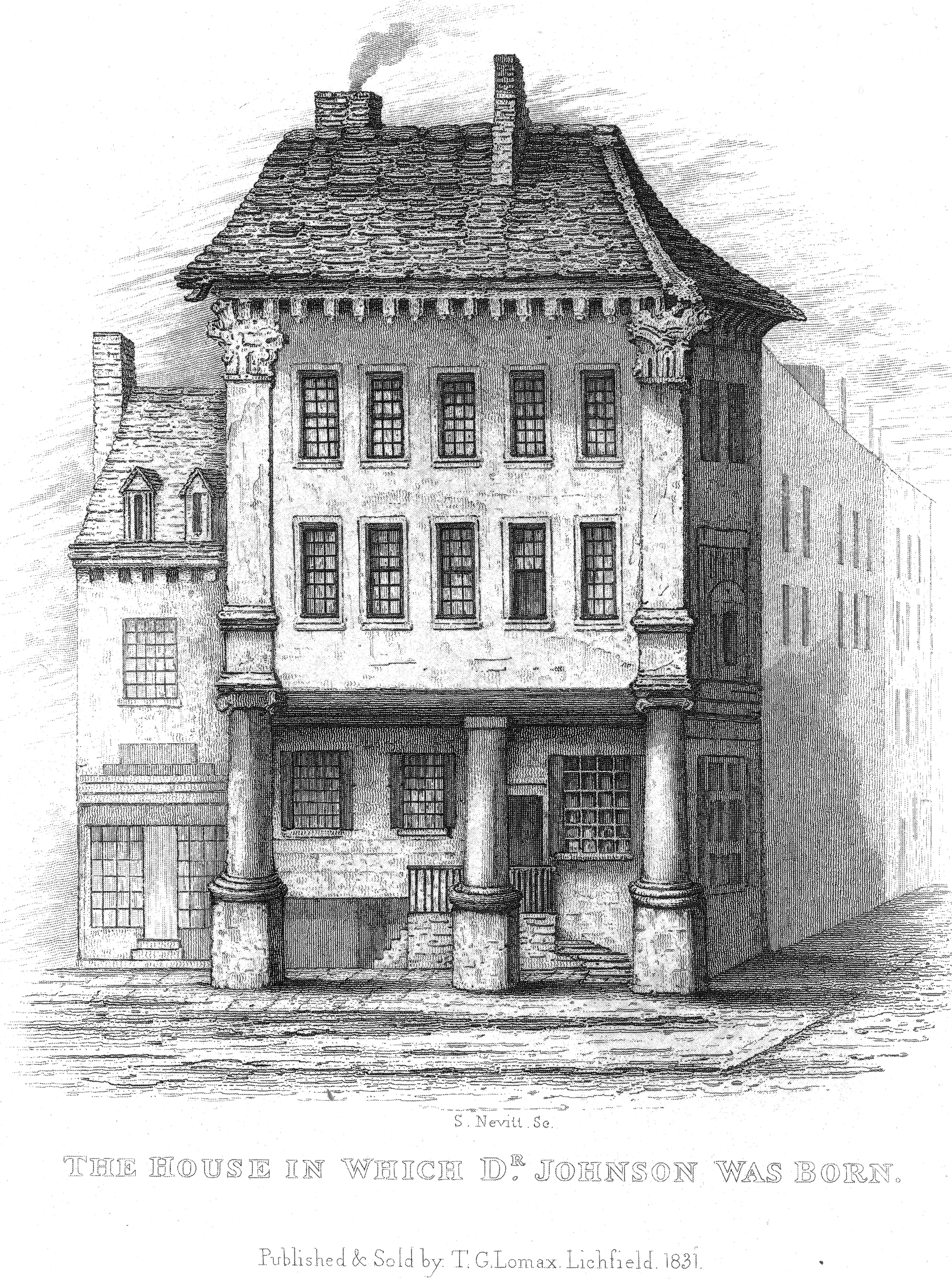
Johnson's house in 1831

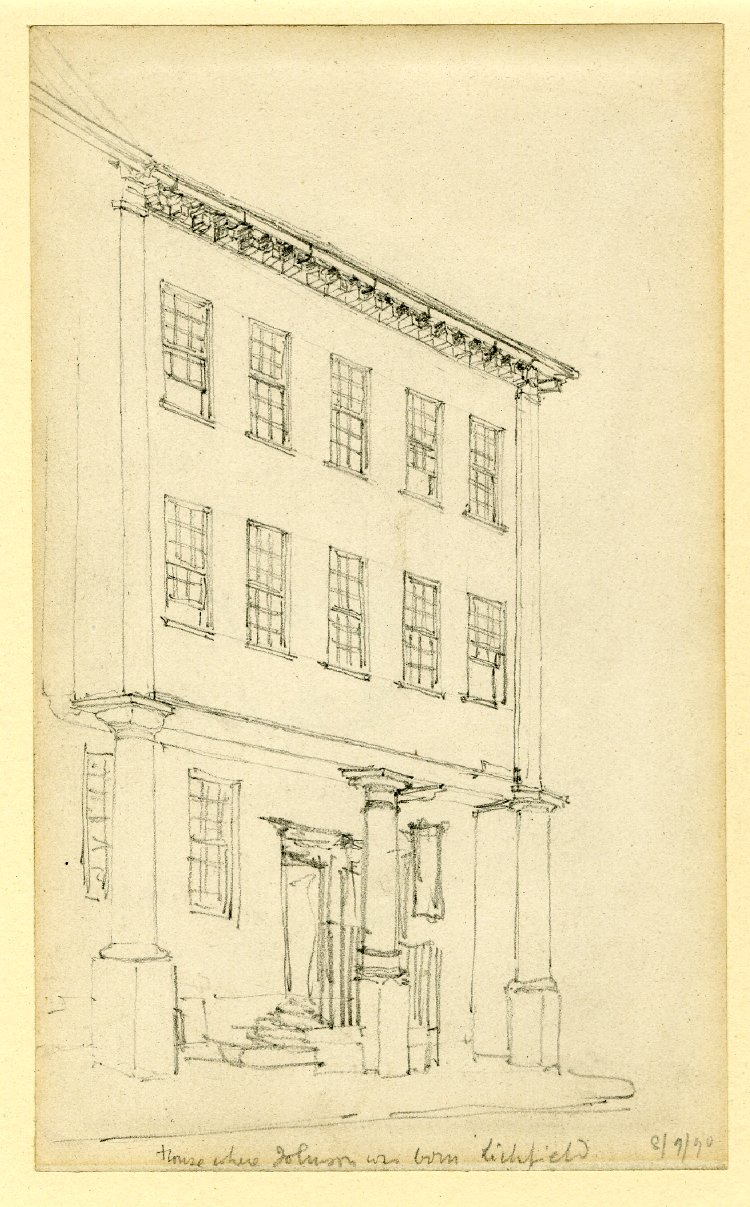
Sketch of the house by Ambrose Macdonald Poynter (1890)

=== Pre-museum ===
The house was built in 1707 by Michael Johnson and served him as a bookshop and residence. On 18 September 1709 Samuel Johnson was born at the house and spent much of his early life in the house before leaving for London with David Garrick on 2 March 1737 at the age of 27. The house continued to be occupied by Johnson's mother Sarah after his departure. On 31 January 1739, Johnson and his mother mortgaged the family home to Lichfield town clerk Theophilus Levett, a longtime friend of the family, for £80. The debt was the subject of correspondence between Johnson and Levett, as well as Levett's son John, for some years. Ultimately, Johnson paid off the outstanding mortgage in full. After the death of Johnson's mother in 1759, Johnson asked his stepdaughter Lucy Porter and his parents' servant Catherine Chambers to keep the house and continue running the business.

It is not known when the Johnsons gave up ownership of the house, it may have remained in Johnson's ownership until his death in 1784. As a year after his death in 1785 the house was sold for £235 at an auction in the Swan Inn. The buyer was bookseller Major Morgan who continued the use of the building as a bookshop. From 1817 to 1835 the house was the newspaper office of the Lichfield Mercury. It is thought it then lay empty for a number of years occasionally being used as a grocer, dentists and ironmongers before the premises were bought in 1887 by James Johnson of Stockport in order to preserve the house in which Dr Johnson was born. Under James Johnson's will the house was sold to the city in 1900, the money being given by John Gilbert, and on 27 May 1901 a museum devoted to the life and works of Samuel Johnson was opened.

=== Museum ===
The museum was opened in 1901 and contains an extensive library of manuscripts and books, including over 1,000 books collected by the Rev.d Dr Peter Hay Hunter of Edinburgh and given by his widow in 1911. The museum was run by the city council until 1974, when its management was transferred to the Dr Johnson Birthplace Trust. The restored city council have been the trustee since 1982. The museum also serves as a postal address for the Johnson Society, founded in 1910. The entrance to the bookshop part of the museum that faces onto Market Street was restored in 1990.

The museum currently contains a varied mix of displays, reconstructed rooms and audio-visual media. Visitors are taken through the colourful life and major achievements of Lichfield's most famous son, from troubled childhood, through literary obscurity and financial poverty, to world renown and success. The collection includes prints, paintings, sculpture - including a carved figure of Johnson by Denis Parsons, furniture, manuscripts and books: including many early and rare editions of Johnson's work. The book collection has largely been obtained through two major donations, now housed in the libraries named after their donors: the Hay Hunter and Blum Libraries, and the Wood library contains a further 2,000 volumes. Personal items include Johnson's armchair, tea set, breakfast table and portable writing desk, David Garrick's walking stick and a bookcase belonging to James Boswell.

== In media ==
The museum was featured in the fifth episode of the BBC documentary Seven Ages of Britain, where David Dimbleby visited the museum to read extracts from Johnson's dictionary.

== See also ==
- Grade I listed buildings in Staffordshire
- Listed buildings in Lichfield
- Samuel Johnson
- Early life of Samuel Johnson
- Dr Johnson's House in London; he lived and worked in the house from 1748 to 1759
