= Edial =

Village in Staffordshire, England

Coordinates: 52.675077°N 1.889255°W

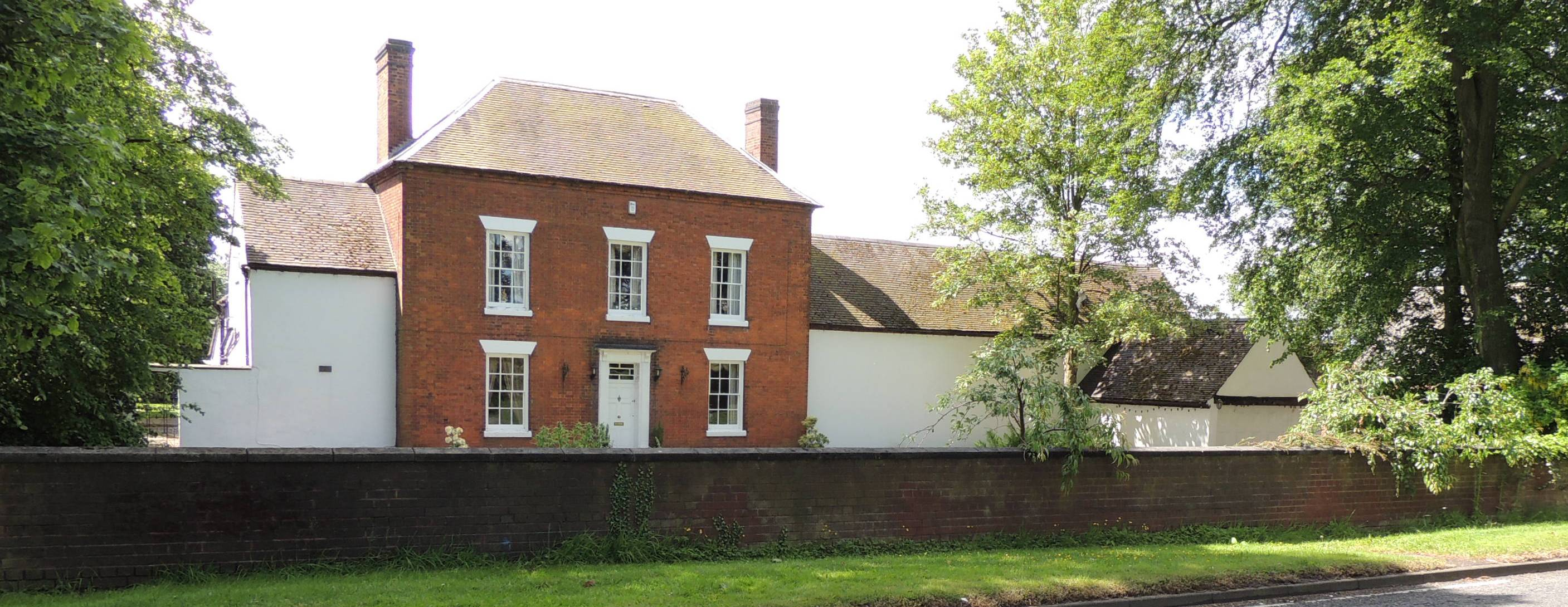
- Edial House Farm, Edial

- Location within Staffordshire
  - London: 128 mi (206 km) SSE
- Civil parish: Burntwood
- District: Lichfield
- Shire county: Staffordshire
- Region: West Midlands
- Country: England
- Sovereign state: United Kingdom
- Post town: Burntwood
- Postcode district: WS7
- Dialling code: 01543
- Police: Staffordshire
- Fire: Staffordshire
- Ambulance: West Midlands
- UK Parliament: Lichfield

Edial is a small village in the civil parish of Burntwood, in the Lichfield District of Staffordshire, England. It is located midway between Burntwood, Hammerwich and Lichfield on the A5190 road.

== History ==
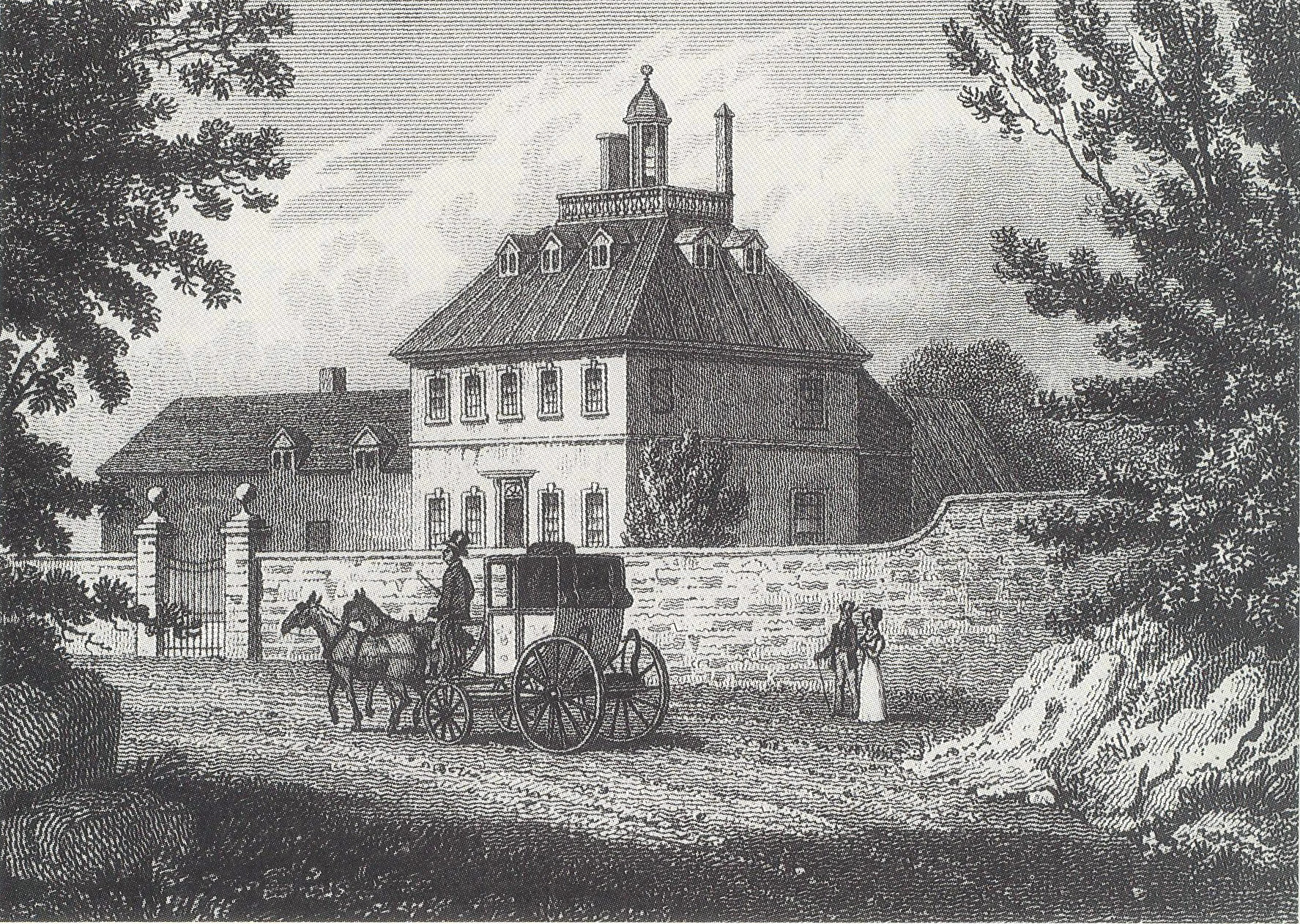
Edial Hall School in 1824 in Edial

Edial Hall School is celebrated as the house in which lexicographer, Samuel Johnson, opened an academy in 1736, where he taught and commenced writing the tragedy Irene. Edial House is a Grade II listed house dating from about 1740.

Edial was one of the three original settlements of Burntwood, alongside neighbouring Burntwood Green and Woodhouses as a township within the ancient parish of Lichfield St Michael. In the mid-19th century, Burntwood Green, Edial and Woodhouses grew alongside the newer villages of Boney Hay, Burntwood, Chase Terrace and Chasetown during the Industrial Revolution and coal mines. Following closure of the coal mines, Burntwood Green was effectively merged with the four villages and now forms a large part of Burntwoods urban area.

However, Edial and Woodhouses managed to maintain their rural identities.

== Amenities ==
Edial is primarily a rural village, with a few farms and residential properties. It is home to "Edial Boarding Kennels & Cattery", which offers boarding kennels and cattery for cats and dogs. Also nearby is a Severn Trent waterworks located on Peter's Lane.

== Transport ==
Edial is served by regular buses operated by both Chaserider and National Express West Midlands. The buses passing through the village. Connecting the village to Walsall, Burntwood, Cannock, Hednesford, Lichfield, and Brownhills.
