= Irene (play) =

Play by Samuel Johnson

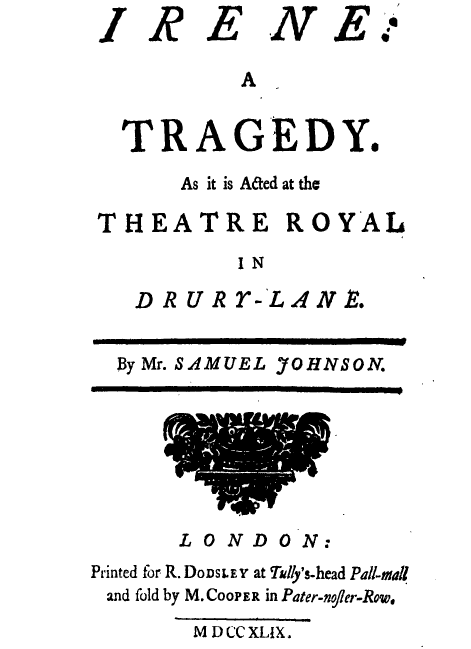
Title page of Irene, first edition 1749

Irene is a Neoclassical tragedy written between 1726 and 1749 by Samuel Johnson. It has the distinction of being the work Johnson considered his greatest failure. Since Johnson's death, critical consensus has been that he was right to think so.

Irene was Johnson's only play, and was first performed on 6 February 1749 in a production by his friend and former pupil David Garrick. The play was a commercial success and earned Johnson more money than anything else he had written up to that point. It was never revived during his lifetime, and there is no subsequent evidence of any other full-scale productions of Irene anywhere until 1999.

== Background ==
Johnson began writing Irene around 1726 when he first began to work in his father's bookshop. While in the bookshop he befriended Gilbert Walmesley, the Registrar of the Ecclesiastical Court of Lichfield. Johnson would discuss Irene with Walmesley, and read him some of the early drafts. At one point, Walmesley told Johnson that "he was making Irene suffer so much in the first part of the play that there would be nothing left for her to suffer in the later part". Johnson joked that there was "enough in reserve... I intend to put my heroine into the ecclesiastical court of Lichfield which will fill up the utmost measure of human calamity".

Johnson wrote a considerable part of Irene in 1737 while teaching at Edial Hall School, the academy he had founded in 1735. Johnson spent his evenings working on his play while ignoring his wife, Elizabeth (known as Tetty). This provoked David Garrick, his student, to perform a skit mocking and embellishing these incidents. However, the play was written mostly for Mrs. Johnson, who was fond of it and hoped it would be a success. Her belief in the play inspired Johnson to finish it and push to have it performed. When Edial Hall failed, Johnson travelled to London and brought the unfinished manuscript with him.

In 1737, Johnson tried to submit Irene to Charles Fleetwood, the owner-manager of the Theatre Royal Drury Lane, but Fleetwood rejected it on the grounds that there was no patron and his theatre was catering to other types of performances. Johnson tried in 1741 to have the unperformed play printed, but this too failed. He seems to have continued to revise it over the next several years, since a manuscript notebook contains draft material made not earlier than June 1746.

It was not until Garrick took over as manager of Drury Lane Theatre that the play was guaranteed a production. By this point Johnson was hard at work on his Dictionary, but he found time for further work on Irene.

== Play ==
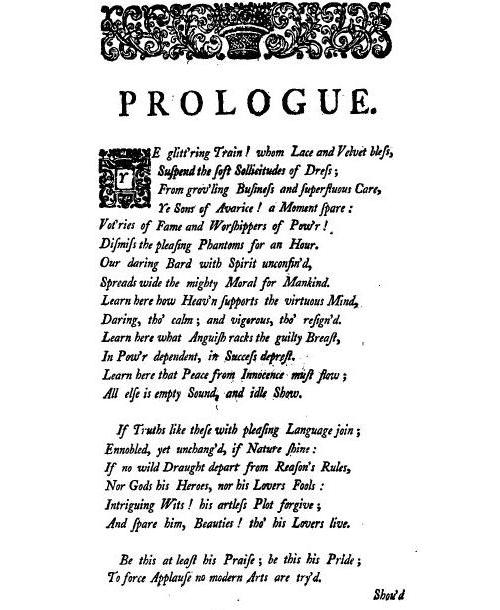
Prologue of Irene, first edition 1749

Johnson's main source for the story of Irene was Richard Knolles's Generall Historie of the Turkes (1603), although he also made some use of George Sandys's Relation of a Journey...containing a Description of the Turkish Empire (1615), Herbelot's Bibliothèque orientale (1697) and Humphrey Prideaux's Life of Mahomet (1697).

In Knolles's work, the Sultan Mahomet conquers Constantinople in 1453 and captures a Greek Christian named Irene. He decides to take her as his mistress, and while pursuing her romantically, he ignores his duties as a monarch. Soon, the kingdom is falling apart from neglect and the subjects begin to riot. Mahomet kills Irene to prove his dedication to his people.

Johnson alters the story to emphasise the theme of Irene's temptation. His Mahomet offers Irene a deal: if she becomes a Muslim, he will preserve her life and give her power at his court.

IRENE:
Forbear — O do not urge me to my ruin!
MAHOMET:
To state and pow'r I court thee, not to ruin:
Smile on my wishes, and command the globe.
Security shall spread her shield before thee,
And Love infold thee with his downy wings.
(Irene II. vii ll. 79–83)

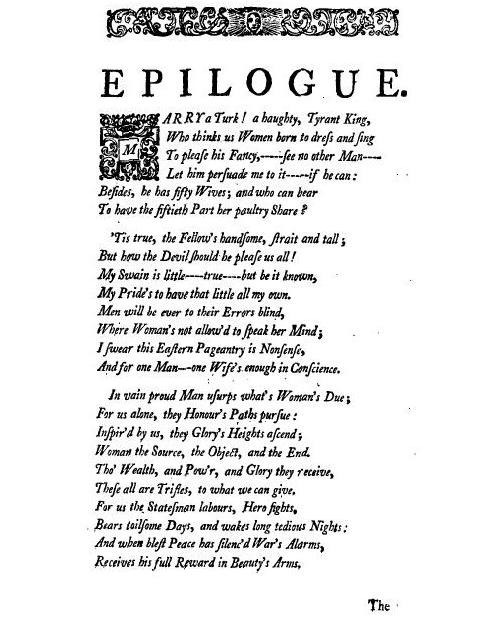
Epilogue of Irene, first edition 1749

Johnson goes on to emphasise how the pursuit of worldly power tends to corrupt. After Irene has accepted the Sultan's offer and abandoned her religious faith, she falls out with her virtuous friend Aspasia:

ASPASIA:
Ah! let me rather seek the convent's cell;
There where my thoughts, at intervals of pray'r,
Descend to range these mansions of misfortune,
Oft' shall I dwell on our disastrous friendship,
And shed the pitying tear for lost Irene.
IRENE:
Go, languish on in dull obscurity;
Thy dazzled soul with all its boasted greatness,
Shrinks at th' o'erpow'ring gleams of regal state,
Stoops from the blaze like a degenerate eagle,
And flies for shelter to the shades of life.
(Irene III. viii. ll. 93–102)

As a result of her decision to become Mahomet's queen, Irene becomes ensnared in a complex power struggle between his various advisors: the First Visier Cali Bassa, the Aga Mustapha, and the officer Abdalla, who is suffering from unrequited love for Aspasia. Mahomet becomes convinced that Bassa, with Irene's complicity, is plotting against him. Two of Abdalla's captains kill Irene, but with her dying words she reveals that Bassa's true accomplice was the Greek soldier Demetrius, Aspasia's lover, who has safely escaped with his loved one. On learning that Irene had not been conspiring against him, Mahomet is distraught:

MAHOMET:
Robb'd of the maid, with whom I wish'd to triumph,
No more I burn for fame or for dominion;
Success and conquest now are empty sounds,
Remorse and anguish seize on all my breast;
Those groves, whose shades embower'd the dear Irene,
Heard her last cries, and fann'd her dying beauties,
Shall hide me from the tasteless world for ever.
(Irene V. xii. ll. 42–48)

The play is written in blank verse but, as Walter Jackson Bate claims, "reads like heroic couplets from which the rhyme has been removed, and couplets in which the poet has so much anxiety to keep a strict regularity of meter that other considerations – even of style and rhythm alone – become sacrificed." It is evident from the scansion of the above lines that Johnson pronounced "Irene" in its Classical form with three syllables (/aɪˈriːniː/, eye-REE-nee) and not in the contemporary form (/ˈaɪriːn/, EYE-reen).

=== Stage history ===
David Garrick's acceptance of Irene for production prompted Johnson to finish rewriting the play. Garrick changed the play's title to Mahomet and Irene, and requested changes that would render the play more acceptable to his sense of theatrical style. Johnson was initially opposed to the changes and complained that Garrick "wants me to make Mahomet run mad, that he may have an opportunity of tossing his hands and kicking his heels". Johnson's friend John Taylor resolved the dispute and Johnson ultimately carried out Garrick's suggestions, which included revising Irene's death scene so that she would be strangled onstage, instead of offstage as originally written.

Mahomet and Irene opened on 6 February 1749. Elizabeth Johnson was unable to attend the performance because of illness. Johnson arrived at the theatre in the kind of clothing he considered as the "distinction of dress" required of a playwright; he wore "a scarlet waistcoat with gold lace and a gold-laced hat". The Prologue "soothed the audience, and the play went off tolerably, till it came to the conclusion". The conclusion in question was Irene's onstage strangulation, which upset the audience and provoked shouts of "Murder!". The actress quickly left the stage; for all successive performances Garrick restored Johnson's original ending.

The play was performed for nine nights, by the standards of 18th century London a very respectable run. Johnson received £195 17s. for the performances. Robert Dodsley published the playscript on 16 February 1749 and Johnson received an additional £100. This made Irene the most financially lucrative work Johnson had yet written: during this period of his career, only the Dictionary earned him more money.

=== Cast ===
Hannah Pritchard played the role of Irene and Garrick cast himself in the role of Demetrius. Other notable actors in the play's original cast were Susannah Maria Arne (using her professional name "Mrs. Cibber") as Aspasia and Spranger Barry as Mahomet.

The complete cast list, according to the first edition, is as follows:

- Mahomet, Emperor of the Turks — Mr. Barry
- Cali Bassa, First Visier — Mr. Berry
- Mustapha, A Turkish Aga — Mr. Sowden
- Abdalla, An Officer — Mr. Harvard
- Hasan, Turkish Captain — Mr. Usher
- Caraza, Turkish Captain — Mr. Burton
- Demetrius, Greek Nobleman — Mr. Garrick
- Leontius, Greek Nobleman — Mr. Blakes
- Murza, A Eunuch — unlisted
- Aspasia, Greek Lady — Mrs. Cibber
- Irene, Greek Lady — Mrs. Pritchard
- Attendants on Irene — unlisted

== Critical response ==
Irene has never been the most admired of Johnson's works. Even James Boswell found it wanting:

Analysed into parts, it will furnish a rich store of noble sentiments, fine imagery, and beautiful language; but it is deficient in pathos, in that delicate power of touching the human feelings, which is the principle end of the drama. Indeed Garrick has complained to me, that Johnson not only had not the faculty of producing the impressions of tragedy, but that he had not the sensibility to perceive them.

Johnson's friend Bennet Langton recorded the author's own later disenchantment with the piece:

At another time, when one was reading his tragedy Irene to a company at a house in the country, he [Johnson] left the room; and somebody having asked him the reason of this, he replied, "Sir, I thought it had been better."'

The early 20th century consensus was summarized by George Sampson in 1941: "Of his early tragedy Irene [...] it is enough to say that its moral dialogues, its correctness of plan and its smoothness of verse do not suffice to give it any rank as drama." T. S. Eliot suggested an explanation for the play's unpopularity and neglect:

His verse has none of the dramatic qualities; it is correct, but correctness in such isolation becomes itself a fault. The play would be more readable to-day, if he had written it in rhyme; the whole would be more easily declaimed, and the good things more easily remembered; it would lose none of its excellence of structure, thought, vocabulary and figures of speech. What would be mellifluous in rhyme, is merely monotonous without it.

F. R. Leavis argued that Boswell's criticisms of the play – "that [Johnson] has no sense of the theatre, and worse, cannot present or conceive his themes dramatically" – were "obvious", and that Irene was a failure because Johnson's best poetry (such as The Vanity of Human Wishes) was "a poetry of statement, exposition and reflection: nothing could be remoter from the Shakespearean use of language [...] than the Johnsonian." Like Eliot, Leavis suggested that the play might have been better if Johnson had not been determined to write it in blank verse:

He is clearly determined that his verse shall not be changed into the 'periods of a declaimer', and that it shall not be said that the audience cannot easily perceive 'where the lines end or begin' (see his remarks on blank-verse in the Life of Milton). In couplets, of course, he couldn't have written so dismally. With the absence of rhyme and of the movement goes the absence of wit. And without the wit he is without the Johnsonian weight.

Johnson biographer Walter Jackson Bate has attempted to defend Irene, arguing that the work is considered bad because the reader cannot help being aware that "it is by one of the masters of English prose style (who also had a powerful command of one kind of poetic style), and it is also by one of the supreme critics of literature in whatever language". Bate claims that if contemporary readers were able to encounter the play without knowing who had written it, "it would not seem too bad"; but that Irene was of poor quality when compared to Johnson's other literary achievements: "the heart begins after a while to sink except in the most resolute Johnsonian, and sometimes even then."
