= Elizabeth Johnson (died 1752) =

Wife of Samuel Johnson

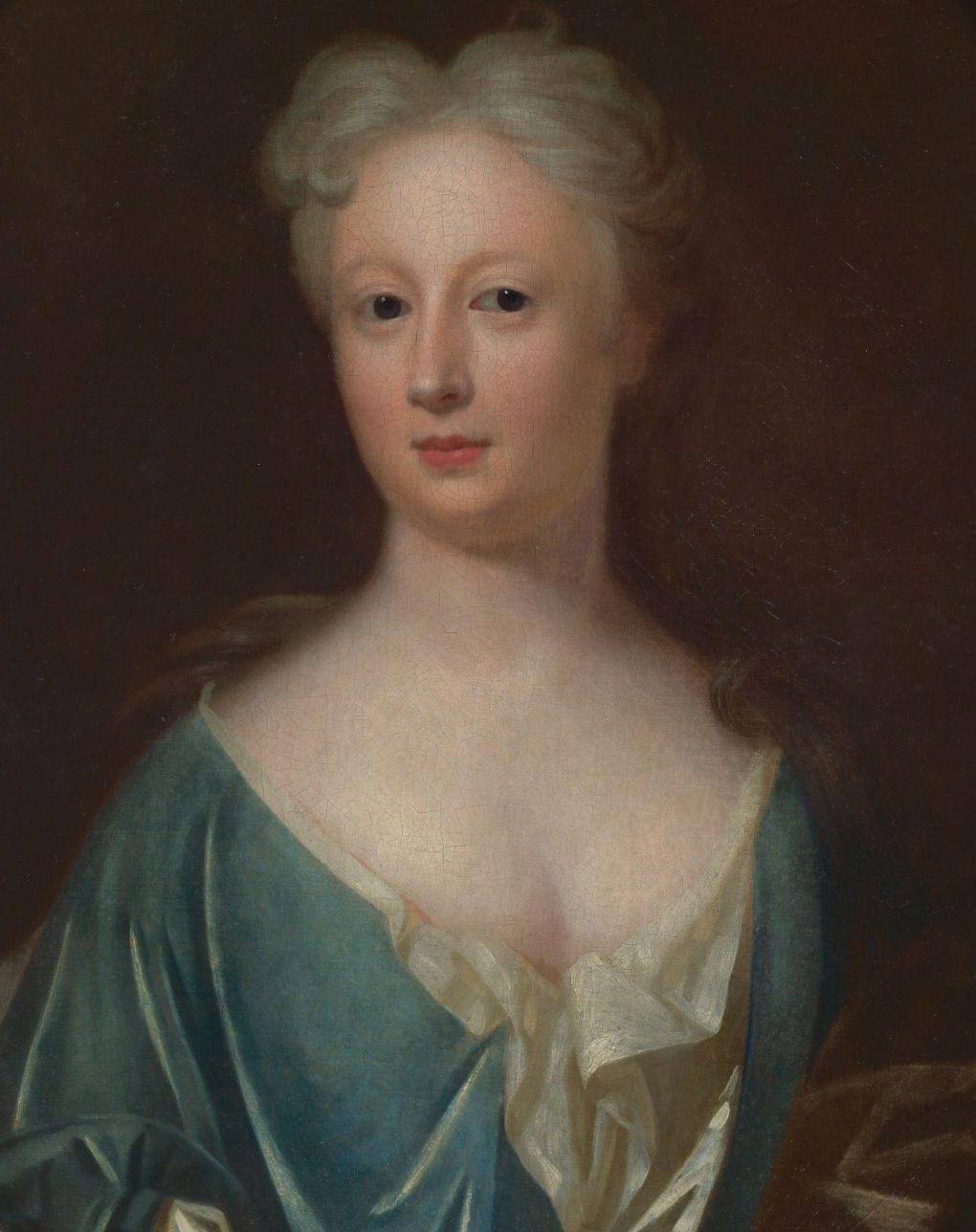
Mrs Samuel Johnson, by Maria Verelst. Now in the Hyde Collection, Houghton Library, *2003JM-8.

Elizabeth Johnson (née Jervis; 4 February 1689 – 17 March 1752 (aged 63)), familiarly known as "Tetty", was the widow of Birmingham merchant Henry Porter, and later the wife of English writer Samuel Johnson, whom she predeceased.

== Biography ==
Elizabeth was born on 4 February 1689 and baptised at Great Peatling (also known as Peatling Magna) on 16 February of that year. (Note: All dates are in the Julian calendar with the start of year from January 1 (see New Style)) She was a daughter of William Jervis (21 June 1659 – January 1695) of Great Peatling, and his wife, Anne, daughter of Henry Darell of Middle Temple. She was the middle daughter of three sisters and three brothers. As her eldest sister died at the age of 11 and the younger at the age of four, Elizabeth was the only daughter to reach adulthood. (Note: Of Elizabeth's three brothers little is known. William Jarvis was born on 10 October 1683, and went to Rugby School. Samuel Jervis was born on 17 January 1686. They were both alive 1703. The eldest brother Richard Jervis (born about 1681 – September 1725) was educated at Rugby School and St John's College, Oxford before inheriting his father's estate at Great Peatling. He married Anne, daughter of Joseph Flude of Dunton Bassett (Reade 1909, pp. 4–5).)

In July 1708 Elizabeth inherited from her grandmother Elizabeth Jervis all her household goods, as well as her plate, rings and cash. She also inherited half of the residue of her grandmother's estate the other half going to her mother Anne.

Elizabeth married Henry Porter (bap. 12 July 1691 – September 1734) on 4 February 1715 (which was her 26th birthday). Henry was a Birmingham merchant, but he was not a successful businessman and on his death Elizabeth had to settle some of his debts. They had three children, all of whom died childless: Lucy (born 1715) lived in Lichfield with Samuel Johnson's mother and served in her shop; Jervis Henry (born 1718) became a naval officer and settled in London; Joseph (born about 1724) became a successful London business man.

Elizabeth and Henry Porter became friends of Johnson in 1732 (on first meeting him, she said to her daughter Lucy, "That is the most sensible man I ever met.") and Johnson courted her after Porter's death. His affectionate names for her, "Tetty" or "Tetsey," were regional contractions for the name "Elizabeth."

They married on 9 July 1735 at St Werburgh's Church, Derby, where the event is reenacted annually. At the time he was 25, she 46, and neither the Johnson nor Porter family was enthusiastic about the marriage.

Her dowry of over £600 was invested in setting up Edial Hall, a private school at Edial near Lichfield. After its failure, in 1737 Johnson moved to London, where she joined him later that year.

In later life she suffered from ill-health, exacerbated by alcohol and opiate medicines. Robert Levet, a poverty-stricken doctor supported by Johnson, ascribed her death to the latter. She died at 63, and is buried in Bromley Parish Church. According to the Latin inscription Johnson composed for her gravestone, she was beautiful, accomplished, ingenious, and pious ('formosae, cultae, ingeniosae, piae'). Johnson called the marriage "a love-match on both sides," and always recalled her affectionately and with grief, especially on the anniversary of her death.

The chief descriptions of her, however, come from unsympathetic accounts by Johnson's contemporaries and biographers such as his ex-pupil David Garrick, Hester Thrale and Thomas B. Macaulay: the last described her as "a short, fat, coarse woman, painted half an inch thick, dressed in gaudy colours, and fond of exhibiting provincial airs and graces." The nineteenth- and twentieth-century writer and essayist Alice Meynell judged her less harshly, attacking these critics for prejudice.
