= Edial Hall School =

Coordinates: 52.6760°N 1.8817°W

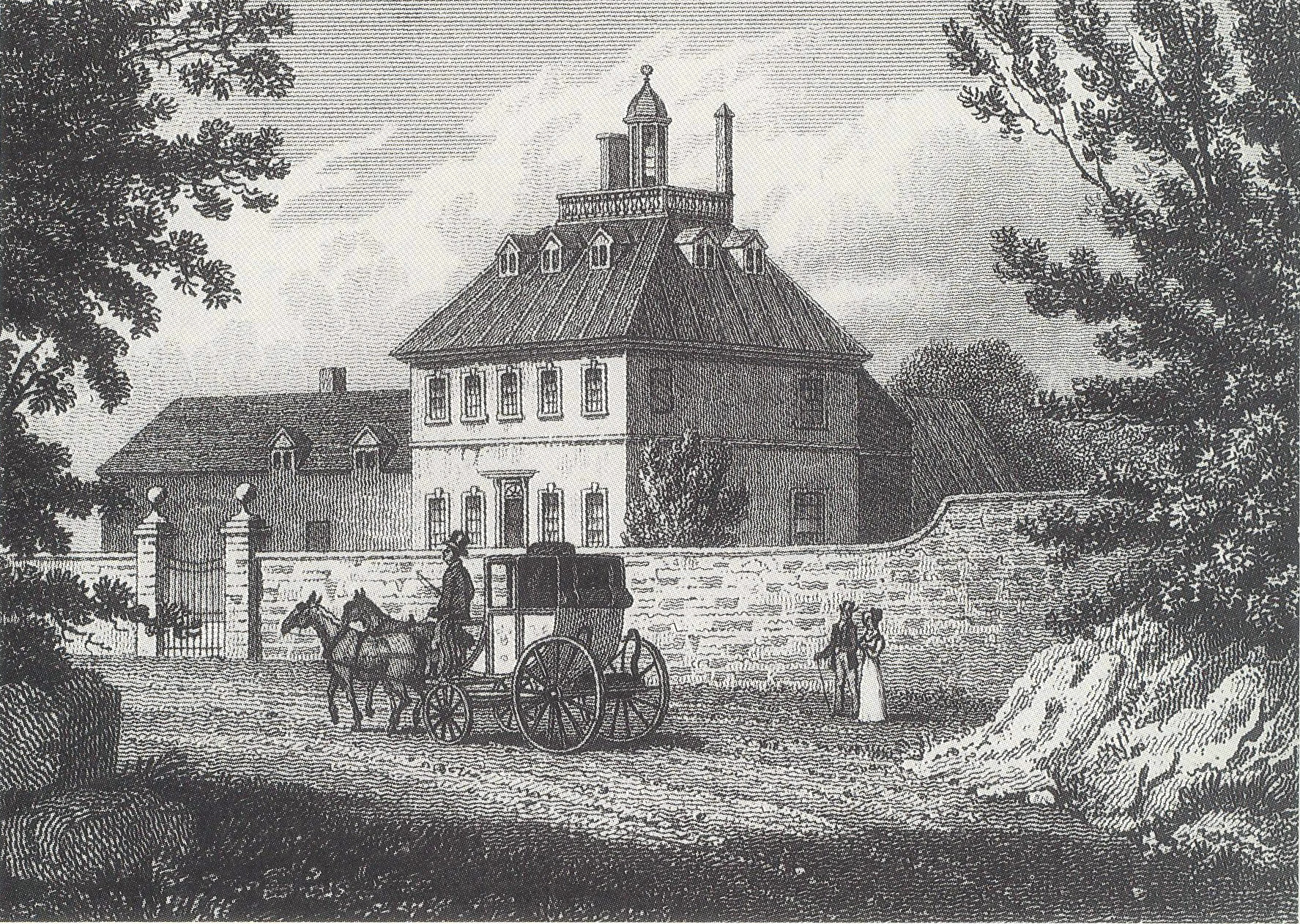
- Edial Hall School in 1824

Location
- Edial; England

Information
- Established: 1735
- Founder: Samuel Johnson
- Closed: c.1736
- Enrollment: c.3-7

Edial Hall School was a school established in 1735 by Samuel Johnson at Edial, near Lichfield. Here, Johnson taught Latin and Greek to young gentlemen. The funds for the school were provided by his wife, "Tetty" Johnson.

Edial only ever gained very few students, estimated to range from three to seven, one of whom was David Garrick. The school was only open for around a year, after which Johnson was forced to close it due to a lack of funds.
