= Political views of Samuel Johnson =

Samuel Johnson (18 September 1709 [O.S. 7 September] – 13 December 1784) was a British intellectual who wrote dozens of essays and a number of pamphlets in which he commented on the political issues of his time.

== Political writings ==
Johnson was known as a staunch Tory or was thought not to be active within politics; his political writings were subsequently disregarded and neglected. Boswell's Life of Samuel Johnson is partly to blame. Boswell did not meet Johnson until later in life and was unable to discuss how politics affected Johnson during his early years. Two periods, Robert Walpole's control over British Parliament and the Seven Years' War, were Johnson's most active periods and are the source for much of his early writings. Although Boswell was present with Johnson during the 1770s and described four major pamphlets written by Johnson, he neglected to discuss them because he is more interested in their travels to Scotland. That is compounded by the fact that Boswell held an opinion contradictory to two of the pamphlets, The False Alarm and Taxation No Tyranny, and so he attacked Johnson's views in his biography—including Johnson's attacks on slavery.

Boswell was not the only reason for Johnson to be disregarded as a political thinker. Thomas Babington Macaulay tried to promote the belief that Johnson's political thoughts were nonsensical and the writings of a bigot. However, Macaulay was also a Whig and established the philosophical view that Whigs and Tories were polar opposites, a view that Johnson did not hold. Johnson's views on politics constantly changed through his life, and he early admitted to sympathies for the Jacobite cause, but by the reign of George III, he had come to accept the Hanoverian Succession. It was Boswell who gave people the impression that Johnson was an "arch-conservative", and it was Boswell who, more than anyone else, determined how Johnson would be seen by people years later.

=== Minor pamphlets ===
The pamphlets played a major role, causing growing tension between America and Britain.

==== False Alarm ====
In 1770, he produced The False Alarm, a political pamphlet attacking John Wilkes.

==== Thoughts Respecting Falkland's Islands ====
In 1771, his Thoughts on the Late Transactions Respecting Falkland's Islands cautioned against war with Spain.

==== The Patriot ====
In 1774, he printed The Patriot, a critique of what he viewed as false patriotism. On the evening of 7 April 1775, he made a famous statement: "Patriotism is the last refuge of a scoundrel." The line was not, as is widely believed, about patriotism in general but rather what Johnson saw as the false use of the term "patriotism" by William Pitt, 1st Earl of Chatham (the prime minister) and his supporters. Johnson opposed most "self-professed patriots" in general but valued what he considered "true" patriotism.

==== Taxation No Tyranny ====
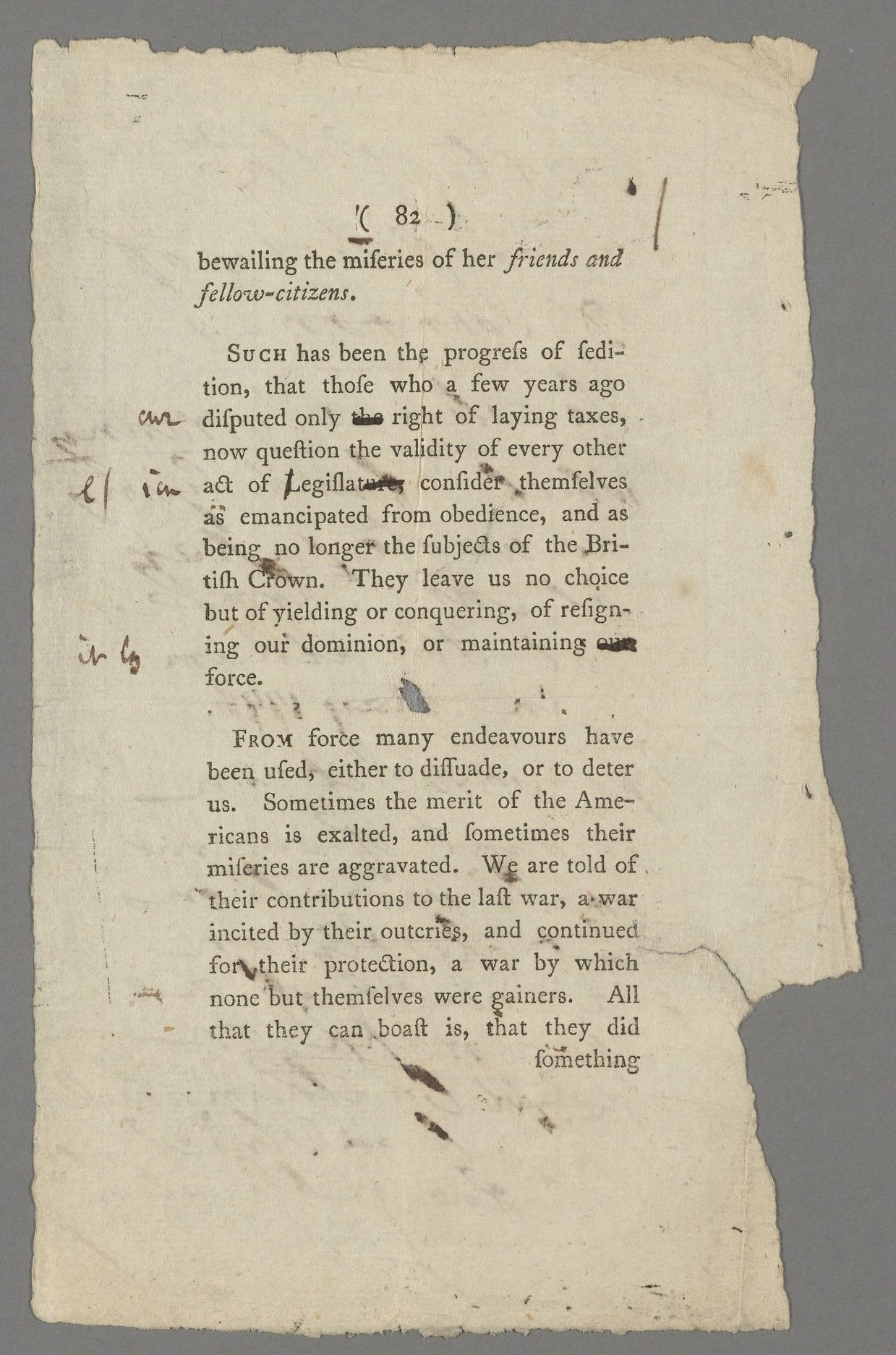
Annotated proofs of Taxation No Tyranny

The last of the pamphlets, Taxation No Tyranny (1775), was a defence of Parliament's Coercive Acts and a response to the Declaration and Resolves of the First Continental Congress, which protested against taxation without representation. Johnson argued that by emigrating to America, colonists had "voluntarily resigned the power of voting" but that they still retained virtual representation in Parliament. He also criticised the pro-slavery positions and ownership of slaves by the American Patriots, writing that if "slavery be thus fatally contagious, how is it that we hear the loudest yelps for liberty among the drivers of negroes?" Johnson denounced British supporters of the Patriot cause as "traitors to this country" and hoped that the matter would be settled without bloodshed but declared that it would ultimately end with "English superiority and American obedience".

== Views ==
Johnson was a devout conservative Protestant Anglican and believed in a unity between the High Church and the Crown (the State). Johnson respected John Milton's poetry but could not tolerate Milton's Puritan and republican beliefs.

=== Colonialism ===
Johnson wrote that the French and Indian War between the French and British colonies in North America was a war between "two robbers" of Native American lands and that neither side deserved to live there. After the signing of the 1783 Treaty of Paris, which marked the Thirteen Colonies' independence from Britain as the United States, Johnson wrote that he was "deeply disturbed" with the "state of this kingdom".

=== Scotland ===
James Boswell, a Scotsman, was a close companion and friend of Johnson during many important times of his life, but Johnson, like many in England, held hostile views on Scotland and its people. During their journey together through Scotland, Johnson "exhibited prejudice and a narrow nationalism". Hester Thrale, summarising Johnson's views on Scotland, said "We all know how well he loved to abuse the Scotch, & indeed to be abused by them in return".

On 6 August 1773, 11 years after first meeting Boswell, Johnson set out to visit his friend in Scotland to begin "a journey to the western islands of Scotland", as Johnson's 1775 account of their travels later put it. The work was intended to discuss the social problems and struggles that affected the Scottish public, but it also praised many of the unique facets of Scotland's society, such as a school in Edinburgh for the deaf and mute.

=== Slavery ===
Johnson was a fierce opponent of slavery, unlike most of his fellow Tories, and described it as "an immoral state". That was well before the heyday of the British abolitionist movement, and he once proposed a toast "to the next insurrection of the negroes in the West Indies". He employed a free black manservant, the Jamaican Francis Barber, whom Johnson made his heir. Johnson also criticised the American Patriots' proslavery positions and ownership of slaves during the American Revolution.
